= Eric Nelson Smith =

American herpetologist (born 1969)

- Born: September 18, 1969 (age 57); Oklahoma, United States
- Education: University of Texas at Arlington
- Known for: Research on Central American herpetofauna
- Scientific career
- Fields: Herpetology
- Workplaces: University of Texas at Arlington

Eric Nelson Smith (born September 18, 1969 in Oklahoma) is an American herpetologist. He is specialized in the herpetofauna of Central America. The taxa Crotalus ericsmithi (2008) and Centrolene ericsmithi (2023) are named in his honor. Smith has described a total of 84 different taxa.

== Biography ==
Born in Oklahoma, United States in 1969 he and grew up in Guatemala. In 1992 he moved to Texas where he earned his PhD at the University of Texas at Arlington. Afterwards he became professor of biology at the University of Texas at Arlington.

== Taxa named in his honor ==
- Crotalus ericsmithi Campbell & Flores-Villela, 2008
- Centrolene ericsmithi, Diego F. Cisneros-Heredia et al., 2023

== Selected species described ==
- Atropoides indomitus Smith & Ferrari-Castro, 2008
- Bolitoglossa centenorum Campbell, Smith, Streicher, Acevedo & Brodie, 2010
- Bolitoglossa daryorum Campbell, Smith, Streicher, Acevedo & Brodie, 2010
- Bolitoglossa eremia Campbell, Smith, Streicher, Acevedo & Brodie, 2010
- Bolitoglossa guaramacalensis Schargel, García-Pérez & Smith, 2002
- Bolitoglossa huehuetenanguensis Campbell, Smith, Streicher, Acevedo & Brodie, 2010
- Bolitoglossa kaqchikelorum Campbell, Smith, Streicher, Acevedo & Brodie, 2010
- Bolitoglossa la Campbell, Smith, Streicher, Acevedo & Brodie, 2010
- Bolitoglossa ninadormida Campbell, Smith, Streicher, Acevedo & Brodie, 2010
- Bolitoglossa nussbaumi Campbell, Smith, Streicher, Acevedo & Brodie, 2010
- Bolitoglossa nympha Campbell, Smith, Streicher, Acevedo & Brodie, 2010
- Bolitoglossa pacaya Campbell, Smith, Streicher, Acevedo & Brodie, 2010
- Bolitoglossa psephena Campbell, Smith, Streicher, Acevedo & Brodie, 2010
- Bolitoglossa suchitanensis Campbell, Smith, Streicher, Acevedo & Brodie, 2010
- Bolitoglossa tzultacaj Campbell, Smith, Streicher, Acevedo & Brodie, 2010
- Bolitoglossa xibalba Campbell, Smith, Streicher, Acevedo & Brodie, 2010
- Bothriechis thalassinus Campbell & Smith, 2000
- Calliophis haematoetron Smith, Manamendra-Arachchi & Somaweera, 2008
- Charadrahyla tecuani Campbell, Blancas-Hernández & Smith, 2009
- Chapinophis Campbell & Smith, 1998
- Chapinophis xanthocheilus Campbell & Smith, 1998
- Coniophanes michoacanensis Flores-Villela & Smith, 2009
- Craugastor campbelli (Smith, 2005)
- Craugastor cyanochthebius McCranie & Smith, 2006
- Craugastor galacticorhinus (Canseco-Márquez & Smith, 2004)
- Craugastor nefrens (Smith, 2005)
- Cryptotriton monzoni (Campbell & Smith, 1998)
- Cryptotriton wakei (Campbell & Smith, 1998)
- Dendrotriton chujorum Campbell, Smith, Streicher, Acevedo & Brodie, 2010
- Dendrotriton kekchiorum Campbell, Smith, Streicher, Acevedo & Brodie, 2010
- Duellmanohyla Campbell & Smith, 1992
- Nototriton brodiei Campbell & Smith, 1998
- Osteocephalus exophthalmus Smith & Noonan, 2001
- Plectrohyla ephemera (Meik, Canseco-Márquez, Smith & Campbell, 2005)
- Plectrohyla miahuatlanensis Meik, Smith, Canseco-Márquez & Campbell, 2006
- Ptychohyla dendrophasma (Campbell, Smith & Acevedo, 2000)
- Ptychohyla sanctaecrucis Campbell & Smith, 1992
- Rhacophorus achantharrhena Harvey, Pemberton & Smith, 2002
- Rhacophorus barisani Harvey, Pemberton & Smith, 2002
- Rhacophorus catamitus Harvey, Pemberton & Smith, 2002
- Rhinella amboroensis (Harvey & Smith, 1993)
- Rhinella justinianoi (Harvey & Smith, 1994)
- Tantilla ceboruca Canseco-Márquez, Smith, Ponce-Campos, Flores-Villela & Campbell, 2007
