= Coal-black salamander =

Conservation status
- Endangered (IUCN 3.1)

Scientific classification
- Kingdom: Animalia
- Phylum: Chordata
- Class: Amphibia
- Order: Urodela
- Family: Plethodontidae
- Genus: Bolitoglossa
- Species: B. anthracina

Binomial name
- Bolitoglossa anthracina Brame, Savage, Wake & Hanken, 2001

Species of amphibian

The coal-black salamander (Bolitoglossa anthracina) is a species of lungless salamander in the family Plethodontidae endemic to Panama. It resides in montane forests in known elevations between 1100 m to 1760 m (3610 and 4760 ft). It is completely black in color apart from the soles of its feet, being a grey color. The species is known to be active at night. The largest threats to the species are habitat loss due to agriculture and an increase in area needed for livestock.

== Taxonomy ==
The coal-black salamander was officially named by Brame, Savage, Wake, and Hanken in 2001 in a paper called "New Species of Large Black Salamander, Genus Bolitoglossa (Plethodontidae) from Western Panamá", however, the species was discovered much earlier in 1973 by Wake, Brame, and Duellman but not recognized due to the lack of concrete identifications in the Bolitoglossa family and the fact that they only had one specimen.

The species is a member of the family Plethodontidae known as the lungless salamanders. The coal-black salamander being a member of the family shares its characteristics of lacking lungs and breathing through its skin. Reproduction happens solely on land and the salamander lacks an aquatic larval stage.

The species is also a member of the genus Bolitoglossa consisting of one fifth of all known salamanders. Characteristics in the genus are diverse, with many differences between species within the genus. Salamanders in the genus have morphologically adapted to different conditions and environments.

The species is named anthracina due to the uniform black color throughout the organism, with the name coming from the Greek word for coal, anthrakinos.

== Morphology ==
The coal-black salamander is similar to many members of its genus, with differences being in its size, color, and a few of its physical characteristics. It is a large salamander for its genus with a standard length of 46 millimeters for males and 57.5-70.8 millimeters for females measured from the tip of the snout to the posterior vent (cloaca).

The species has long, slender limbs and small nostrils. The salamander is characterized by having an unusually large amount of maxillary teeth compared to other black salamanders, with a total of 91 maxillary teeth in the collected holotype that extend posteriorly towards the end of the eyeball. There are also seven small premaxillary teeth that are inside the mouth in the same series. The species also has 39 vomerine teeth that are curved and extend one millimeter past the lateral margin of the internal nares.

It has a broad head with the standard length being seven times the width of the head and 4.4 times the head length. Limbs are only slightly longer compared to other species, with standard length being 4.9 times the right forelimb length and 4.5 times the right hindlimb length in the holotype. The tail has been noted to be longer than the body, with a captured specimen having a tail length of 78.2 millimeters, however, in other specimen the tail length is similar in length to the body. The presence of a longer prehensile tail is likely an adaptation of being a primarily arboreal species which its natural habitat consists mostly of.

In terms of coloring, the species has bronze colored irises with slight amounts of dark brown. It is completely black except for its palms and soles, which can be a light to medium grey. The ventral surfaces of the trunk and the gular region are slightly lighter in color than the dorsal surfaces, making the salamander have variations in color throughout its body.

The main identifier in differentiating the coal-black salamander from other species is that it lacks a distinct light-colored tail ring present in Bolitoglossa robusta and it has a shorter tail and narrower head compared to Bolitoglossa nigrescens. There is also less webbing present in the feet of the species compared to others. These key differences allowed Bolitoglossa anthracina to be distinguished from other better described species.

== Distribution and habitat ==
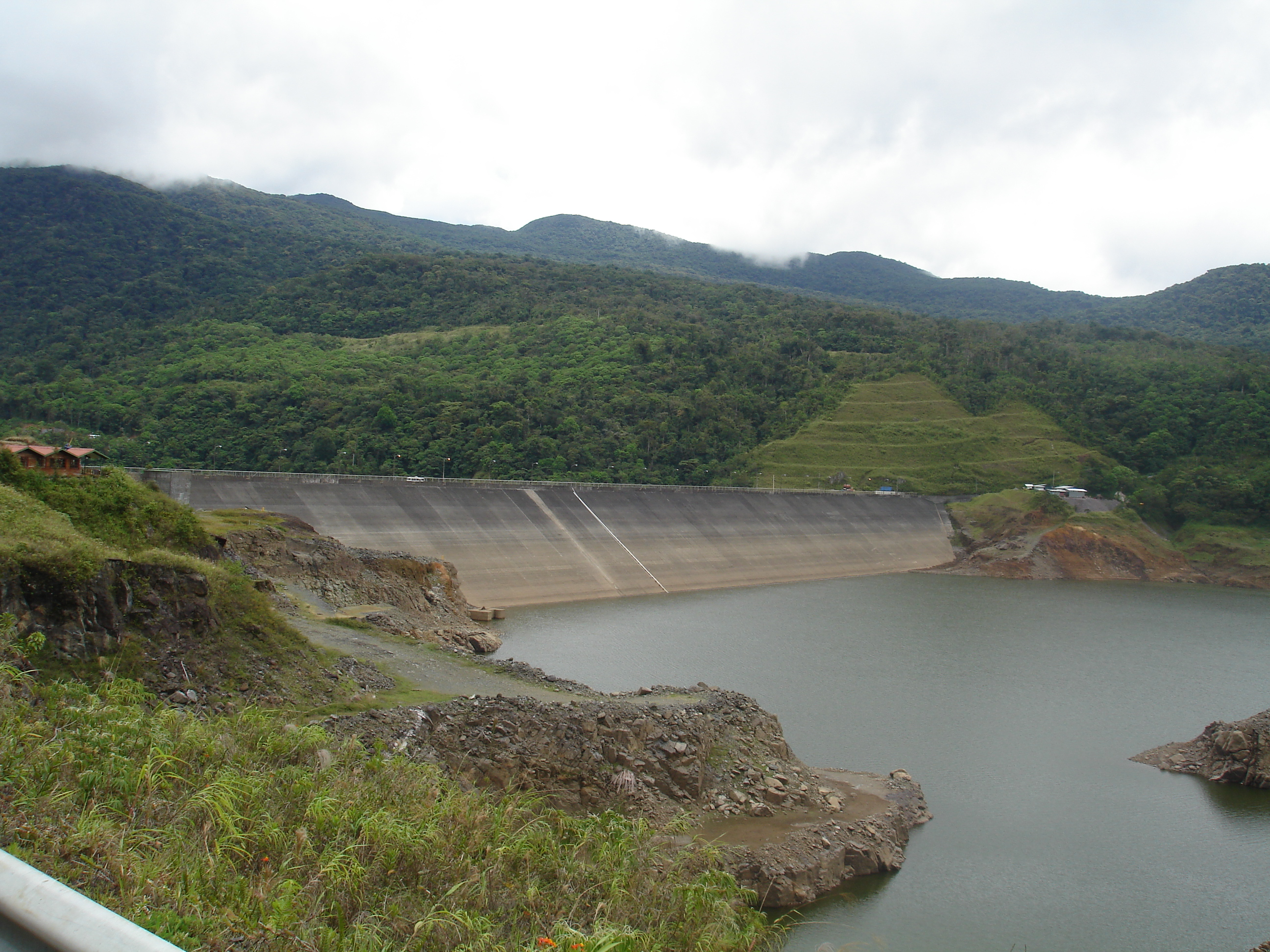
Fortuna Forest Reserve Dam around where the coal-black salamander has been found.

The species has previously been difficult to identify, with only four specimen being able to be captured. It is entirely endemic to Panama, with an unconfirmed presence in Costa Rica. The species is confirmed to reside within the Fortuna Forest Reserve, with two specimen collected in Cerro Pando in the Talamancan montane forests and considered possibly extinct from the area according to IUCN. The salamander resides in montane forests characterized by high elevations, cooler temperatures, higher rainfall, and arboreal terrain.

With only a few specimen collected, there is no estimation for the number of species present or the complete distribution of the species. The species may be present in Costa Rica as it has been found on the Cerro Pando mountain on the border of Panama and Costa Rica, however, it is unconfirmed and no species have been found in Costa Rica. The Fortuna Forest Reserve mentions that it contains the entire known population of coal-black salamanders of which three specimen have been found. There is no confirmed presence of coal-black salamanders outside of these two areas.

== Threats ==
The primary threat to the salamander is the risk of habitat loss throughout Panama. The Fortuna Forest Reserve was created to protect the watershed of the Fortuna Dam, however, illegal agriculture development is an issue and the expanding of livestock farming which can damage lower altitudes. In the forest reserve, plans to construct windmills were made that could likely destroy habitat in the cloud forests where the salamander resides. Plans to construct the windmills have been cancelled, however, it is not impossible that the plans continue.
