= El Copé giant salamander =

Conservation status
- Critically Endangered (IUCN 3.1)

Scientific classification
- Kingdom: Animalia
- Phylum: Chordata
- Class: Amphibia
- Order: Urodela
- Family: Plethodontidae
- Genus: Bolitoglossa
- Species: B. copia

Binomial name
- Bolitoglossa copia Wake, Hanken & Ibáñez, 2005

Species of amphibian

The El Copé giant salamander (Bolitoglossa copia) is a species of salamander in the family Plethodontidae. It is a large salamander for its genus, measuring 81.5 mm (3.21 in) in snout–vent length. It is entirely black in color, excepting its throat and chest, which are white. It also has wide, extremely webbed feet. It is endemic to Panama, where it has been recorded only from Cerro Peña Blanca, a mountain in the General de División Omar Torrijos Herrera National Park. It was collected from rainforest at an elevation of 1,315 m (4,300 ft). It is classified as being critically endangered by the IUCN due its extremely limited range and ongoing habitat degradation.

== Taxonomy ==
Bolitoglossa copia was formally described in 2005 based on an adult male specimen collected from the General de División Omar Torrijos Herrera National Park in the Panamanian province of Coclé. The specific can intentionally be interpreted in several ways, giving it several meanings. In Spanish, copia can mean "copy" or "copiousness", alluding to the many similar big black salamanders in its genus that B. copia could be mistaken for. The name is also an homage to the town of El Copé near the type locality and to the herpetologist Edward Drinker Cope. It has the English common names El Copé giant salamander and El Copé mushroomtongue salamander.

The salamander is in the subgenus Eladinea and part of the Bolitoglossa schizodactyla species group.

== Description ==
The holotype adult male is the only known specimen of Bolitoglossa copia. It measured 81.5 mm (3.21 in) in snout–vent length. Like the many other "big black Bolitoglossa" that occur from Central America south to Colombia, the species is entirely black in color, excepting its throat and chest, which are white. It also has wide feet with a considerable amount of webbing. It can be distinguished from other black congeners by the absence of a light ring at the foot of the tail and the number of the vomerine and maxillary teeth.

== Distribution and habitat ==
Bolitoglossa copia is endemic to Panama, where it has been recorded only from Cerro Peña Blanca, a mountain in the General de División Omar Torrijos Herrera National Park in Panama. Cerro Peña Blanca is part of the Panamanian Cordillera Central and is the highest mountain in the national park. The salamander was collected from rainforest at an elevation of 1,315 m (4,300 ft), near the summit. As many tropical salamanders in the Americas only inhabit a limited range of elevations, B. copia is likely not found very widely outside its known range.

== Conservation ==
Bolitoglossa copia is classified as being critically endangered by the IUCN due its extremely limited range and ongoing habitat degradation. The species' range is threatened by logging and development. Subsequent surveys at the type locality have failed to find this species, although they have been extremely limited and below the salamender's known elevational range. Salamander chytrid fungus, a pathogen that has devastated European salamander populations post its 2010 introduction to that continent, has not yet spread to the Americas, but still presents a future threat to the species if it ever spreads to Panama.
