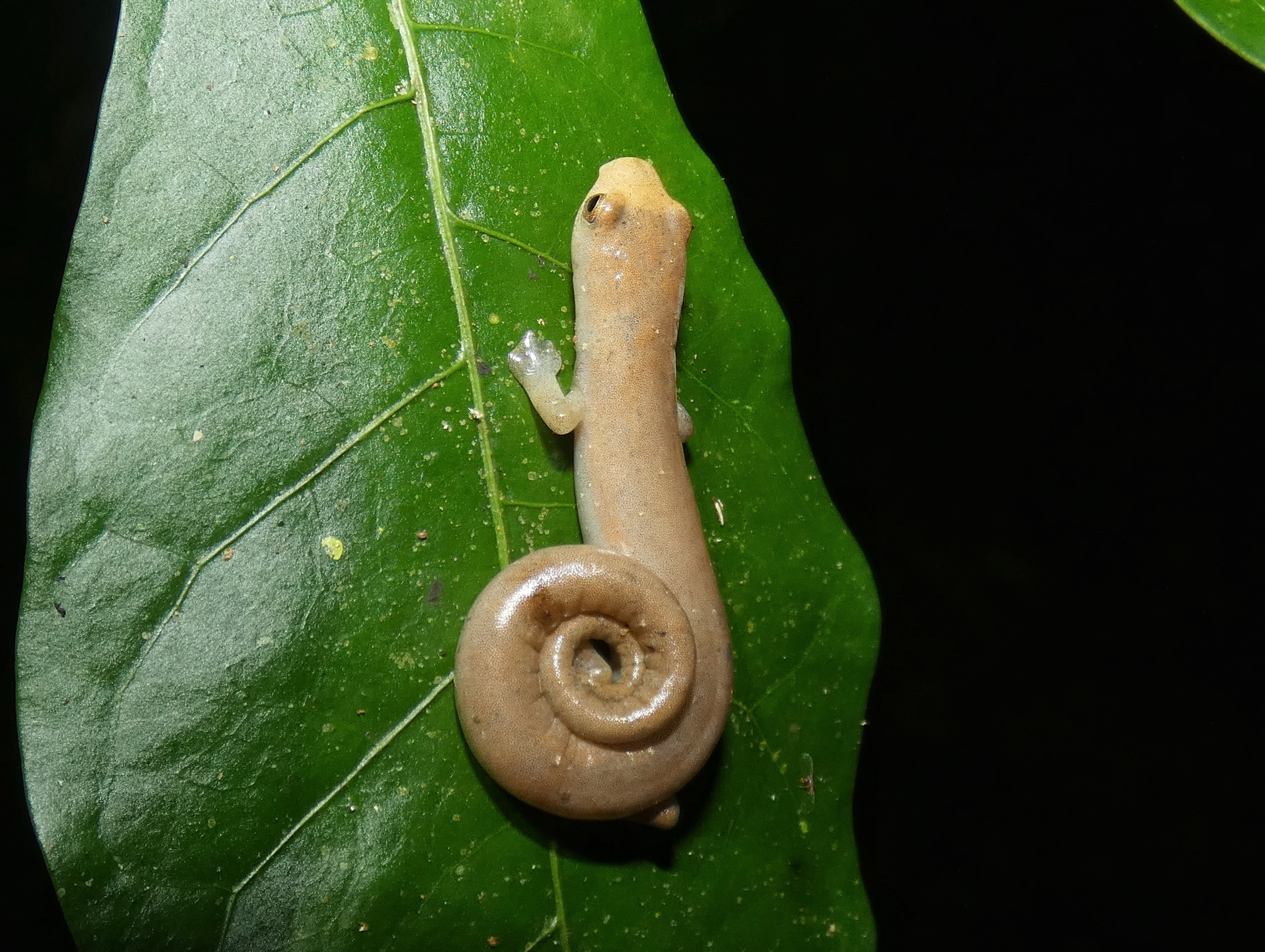

Conservation status
- Endangered (IUCN 3.1)

Scientific classification
- Kingdom: Animalia
- Phylum: Chordata
- Class: Amphibia
- Order: Urodela
- Family: Plethodontidae
- Genus: Bolitoglossa
- Species: B. cuna

Binomial name
- Bolitoglossa cuna Wake, Brame & Duellman, 1973

= Camp Sasardi salamander =

Species of amphibian

The Camp Sasardi salamander (Bolitoglossa cuna) is a species of salamander in the family Plethodontidae. It is a medium-sized species for its genus, with females reaching a snout–vent length of 46.6–55.7 mm (1.8–2.2 in). They are light golden-tan in color and have webbed feet. It is endemic to the moist lowland tropical rainforests of eastern Guna Yala province in Panama. It is classified as being endangered by the IUCN due its limited range and ongoing habitat degradation.

== Taxonomy ==
Bolitoglossa cuna was formally described in 1973 based on an adult female specimen collected from Camp Sasardi in the Guna Yala province of Panama. It has the English common names Camp Sasardi salamander and Camp Sasardi mushroomtongue salamander.

The salamander is in the subgenus Eladinea and part of the Bolitoglossa adspersa species group. Some authorities have suggested that it may be the same species as B. biseriata.

== Description ==
A medium-sized species for its genus, female Bolitoglossa cuna reach a snout–vent length of 46.6–55.7 mm (1.8–2.2 in). They have rather long tails and wholly webbed feet. The back is light golden-tan while the underside is lighter in color.

== Distribution and habitat ==
Bolitoglossa cuna is endemic to Panama. It inhabits the moist lowland tropical rainforests of eastern Guna Yala province. It is found at elevations of 10–718 m (33–2,356 ft). It has been observed on low vegetation in forests with substantial leaf litter.

== Conservation ==
Bolitoglossa cuna is classified as being endangered by the IUCN due its limited range and ongoing habitat degradation. It was first collected in the 1960s and then only recorded in 2012. The species' range is threatened by logging and development. It does not seem to adjust well to changes in its habitat. Salamander chytrid fungus, a pathogen that has devastated European salamander populations post its 2010 introduction to that continent, has not yet spread to the Americas, but still presents a future threat to the species if it ever spreads to Panama.
