= Bolitoglossa eremia =

Conservation status
- Endangered (IUCN 3.1)

Scientific classification
- Kingdom: Animalia
- Phylum: Chordata
- Class: Amphibia
- Order: Urodela
- Family: Plethodontidae
- Genus: Bolitoglossa
- Species: B. eremia

Binomial name
- Bolitoglossa eremia Campbell, Smith, Streicher, Acevedo, and Brodie, 2010

Species of amphibian

Bolitoglossa eremia is a lungless salamander in the family Plethodontidae endemic to Guatemala. It is a small to medium-sized salamander for its genus, with females growing to a maximum recorded length of 62 mm (2.4 in) and males to 42 mm (1.7 in). It is a generally grayish-black in color, with a lighter underside and smudged pale pink-orange blotches along the side. It is endemic to Guatemala, where it is found only in the departments of Jalapa and Chiquimula. It is classified as being endangered by the IUCN and is threatened primarily by habitat loss and pollution.

== Taxonomy ==
Specimens belonging to Bolitoglossa eremia had previously been collected from the Soledad Grande Highland Block in the 1950s, when they were recognised as belonging to an as-yet undescribed species of Bolitoglossa. The type series of this species was collected during the 1990s. Bolitoglossa eremia was formally described in 2010 based on an adult female specimen collected from near La Soledad, in the Department of Jalapa in Guatemala, in 1991. The specific epithet is derived from the Greek word eremia, meaning "solitude", referring to the remote village near which it was discovered and the species' distribution, which is distant from those of related salamanders in the B. morio species group. The English common name for the species is Soledad Grande mushroomtongue salamander.

It is placed within the subgenus Magnadigita.

== Description ==
Bolitoglossa eremia is a small to medium-sized salamander for its genus, with females growing to a maximum recorded length of 62 mm (2.4 in) and males to 42 mm (1.7 in). The back, tail, and extremities are dark gray to black with white flecks. The underside is gray with dense white flecking. The sides are usually marked with smudged pale pink-orange blotches that vary in size, with some individuals being almost entirely grayish-black. The throat and ventral aspect of the head are pinkish or dark gray, with fine whitish spots.

== Distribution and habitat ==
Bolitoglossa eremia is endemic to Guatemala, where it is found only in the departments of Jalapa and Chiquimula. In Jalapa, it was initially found in the isolated Cerro Miramundo, where it was recorded from two localities: the villages of La Soledad and Miramundo. It was subsequently also found in the Bosque Encantado Community Reserve, extending its known range in the area by nearly 10 km. In Chiquimula Department, it is known from El Gigante Aldea El Durazno. It occurs at elevations of 1,615–2,660 m (5,299–8,727 ft) in "temperate-cold upland oak forest". It is most common under rotting logs, but can also be found under smaller pieces of wood in the rainy season. They have also been observed above the ground in rotting trunks, leaves, and in dirt crevices. If irritated, the salamander secretes a yellow sunstance from its tail.

== Conservation ==
Bolitoglossa eremia is classified as being endangered by the IUCN. It was considered to be common within its range during surveys from the 1990s until 2005, but subsequent surveys from 2010 to 2016 noted that it was less common than before. The species is threatened primarily by habitat loss and pollution. Habitat degradation in its range is driven by agriculture, timber harvesting, and changes in the timing and intensity of the wet season. Salamander chytrid fungus, a pathogen that has devastated European salamander populations post its 2010 introduction to that continent, has not yet spread to the Americas, but still presents a future threat to the species if it ever spreads to Guatemala.
