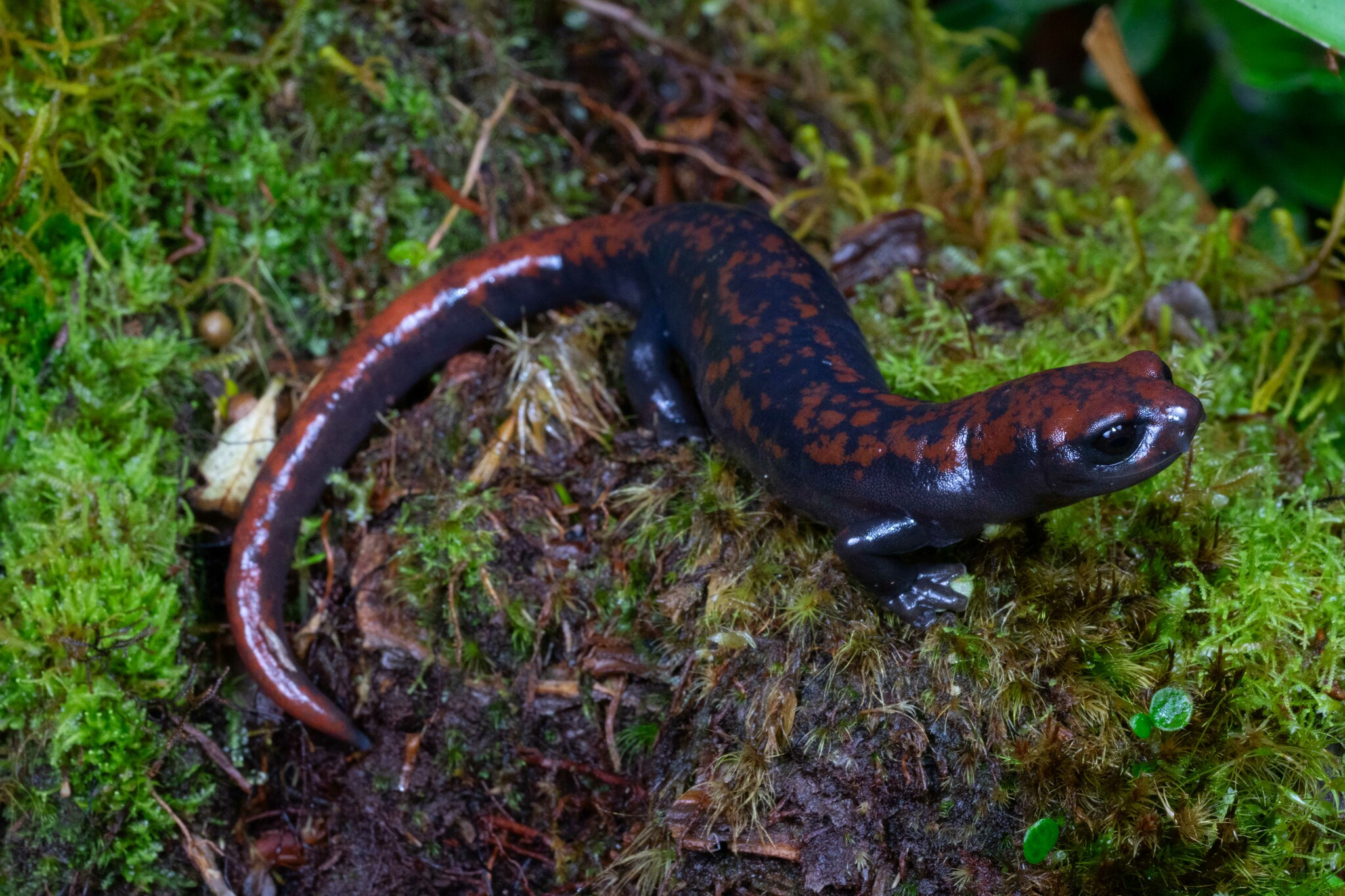

Conservation status
- Endangered (IUCN 3.1)

Scientific classification
- Kingdom: Animalia
- Phylum: Chordata
- Class: Amphibia
- Order: Urodela
- Family: Plethodontidae
- Genus: Bolitoglossa
- Species: B. compacta

Binomial name
- Bolitoglossa compacta Wake, Brame & Duellman, 1973

= Cerro Pando salamander =

Species of amphibian

The Cerro Pando salamander (Bolitoglossa compacta) is a species of salamander in the family Plethodontidae. It is a medium-sized species for its genus, with females reaching a snout–vent length of 68.5–74.2 mm (2.7–2.9 in) and males reaching 53.4 mm (2.1 in). They are mostly dark black in color, with a few pale orange or yellow splotches on the upper sides, and have slightly webbed feet. It is found in the moist montane rainforests of the Costa Rica-Panama border region. It is classified as being endangered by the IUCN due its limited range and ongoing habitat degradation.

== Taxonomy ==
Bolitoglossa compacta was formally described in 1973 based on an adult female specimen collected from Cerro Pando, a mountain in the Bocas del Toro province of Panama. It has the English common names Cerro Pando salamander and Cerro Pando mushroomtongue salamander.

The salamander is in the subgenus Eladinea and part of the Bolitoglossa adspersa species group.

== Description ==
The salamander is a robustly-built and medium-sized species for its genus, with female Bolitoglossa compacta reaching a snout–vent length of 68.5–74.2 mm (2.7–2.9 in) and males measuring 53.4 mm (2.1 in) long. They have medium-sized tails and slightly webbed feet. It is mostly dark black in color, except for a few pale orange or yellow splotches on the upper sides which are sometimes connected to make two ill-defined lines or a band across the back.

== Distribution and habitat ==
Bolitoglossa compacta inhabits moist montane rainforests in the Costa Rica-Panama border region. It is found at elevations of 1,650–2,780 m (5,410–9,120 ft). It has been observed on low vegetation such as palm stems in forests, as well as below dilapidated roofs.

== Conservation ==
Bolitoglossa compacta is classified as being endangered by the IUCN due its limited range and ongoing habitat degradation. The species' range is threatened by logging and development. The species' habitat enjoys strong protection in Costa Rica and it is common in Talamanca in that country, but enforcement is poor in Panamanian protected areas. It does not seem to adjust well to changes in its habitat. Salamander chytrid fungus, a pathogen that has devastated European salamander populations post its 2010 introduction to that continent, has not yet spread to the Americas, but still presents a future threat to the species if it ever spreads to Panama or Costa Rica.
