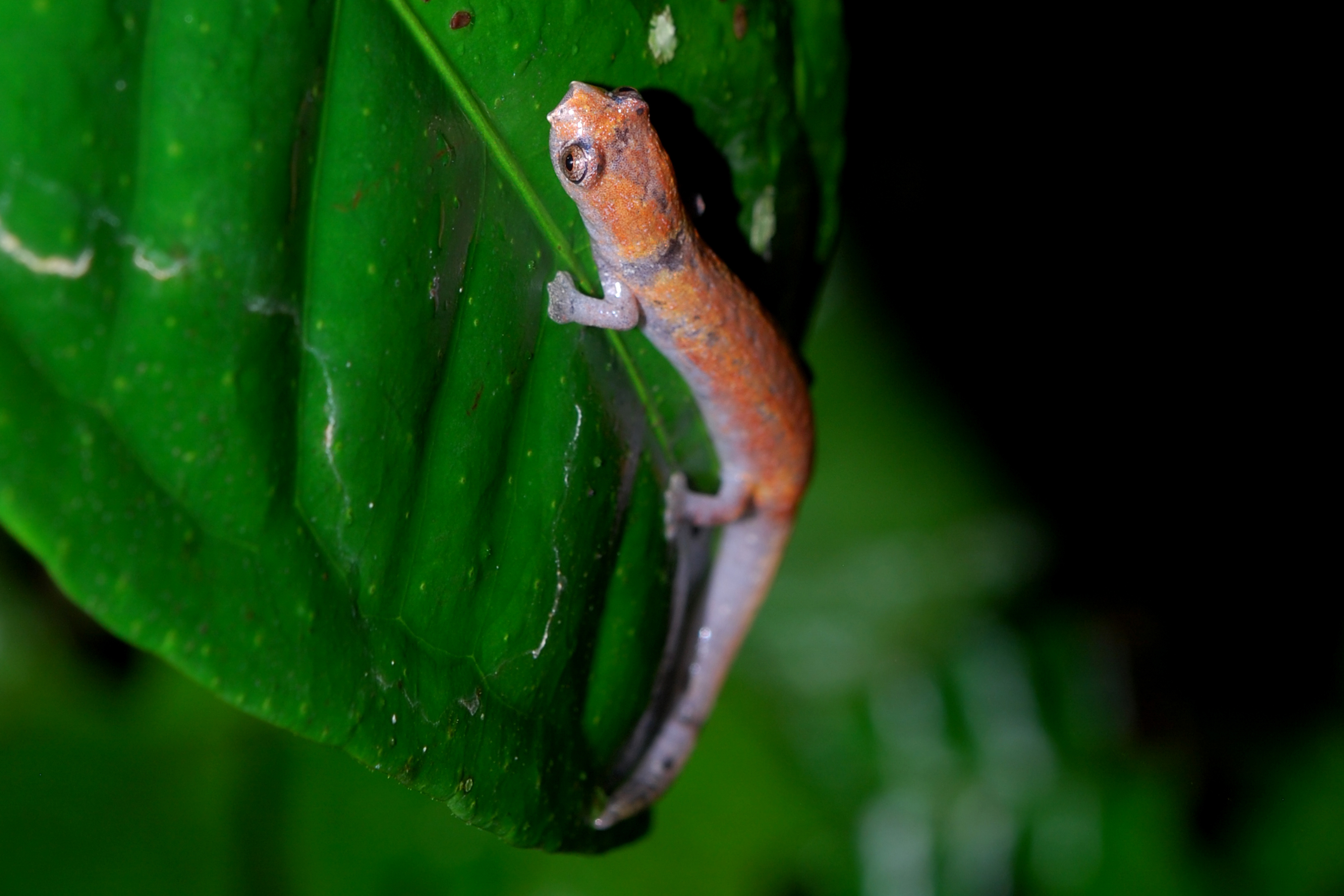

Conservation status
- Least Concern (IUCN 3.1)

Scientific classification
- Kingdom: Animalia
- Phylum: Chordata
- Class: Amphibia
- Order: Urodela
- Family: Plethodontidae
- Genus: Bolitoglossa
- Species: B. altamazonica

Binomial name
- Bolitoglossa altamazonica (Cope, 1874)

Synonyms
- Oedipus altamazonicus Cope, 1874

= Nauta salamander =

Species of amphibian

Nauta salamander (Bolitoglossa altamazonica), also known as the Nauta mushroomtongue salamander, is a species of salamander in the family Plethodontidae. It is found on the eastern and lower slopes of the Andes from Venezuela and Colombia through Ecuador and Peru to Bolivia and east into adjacent Brazil. Its common name refers to its type locality, Nauta, in the Loreto Province, Peruvian Amazon. It might be a composite of several species.

== Description ==
Adult individuals measure 31–48 mm (1.2–1.9 in) in snout–vent length; the tail is almost as long. Colouration is variable: most individuals are darker dorsally and laterally than ventrally, but some have light dorsal streaking and mottling; others are uniformly dorsally dark-coloured.

== Habitat and conservation ==
Natural habitat of Bolitoglossa altamazonica is lowland rainforest where it occurs on low vegetation. It is a locally common species throughout its range. It is locally threatened by habitat loss caused by agriculture and planting of trees.
