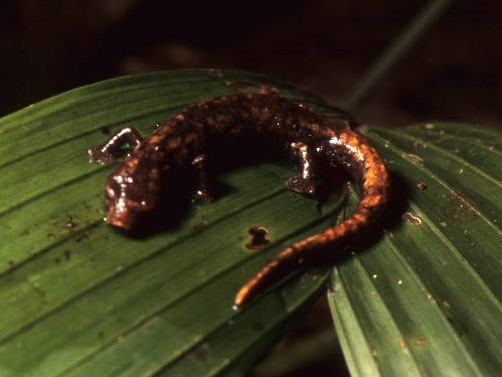

Conservation status
- Least Concern (IUCN 3.1)

Scientific classification
- Kingdom: Animalia
- Phylum: Chordata
- Class: Amphibia
- Order: Urodela
- Family: Plethodontidae
- Genus: Bolitoglossa
- Species: B. palmata

Binomial name
- Bolitoglossa palmata (Werner, 1897)

Synonyms
- Spelerpes palmatus Werner, 1897

= Amazon climbing salamander =

Species of amphibian

The Amazon climbing salamander (Bolitoglossa palmata), also known as the Amazon mushroomtongue salamander, is a species of salamander in the family Plethodontidae. It is a medium-sized salamander for its genus, with a snout–vent length of 35.6–53.3 mm (1.40–2.10 in). It has light brown uppersides and sides and dark brown underside. It is found in Ecuador from the Peruvian border north to Colombia as far as Caquetá. It is classified as being of least concern by the IUCN due to its large range and population.

== Taxonomy ==
Bolitoglossa palmata was formally described in 1897 as Spelerpes palmatus based on a specimen collected from the Ecuadorian Cordillera. It was moved to the genus Bolitoglossa in 1962. The species has the English common names webbed mushroom tongue salamander, Amazon mushroomtongue salamander, and Guacamayo mushroomtongue salamander. In Spanish, it is known as the Salamandra Apulmonada con Membranas.

It is placed within the subgenus Bolitoglossa.

== Description ==
Bolitoglossa palmata is a medium-sized salamander for its genus, with a snout–vent length of 35.6–53.3 mm (1.40–2.10 in). It has light brown uppersides and sides and dark brown underside.

== Distribution and habitat ==
Bolitoglossa palmata is found in the Amazon-facing slopes of Ecuador from the Peruvian border north to Colombia as far as Caquetá. It was long thought to be endemic to Ecuador, but was first reported from Colombia in 2012. It is found in montane forest at elevations of 1,250–2,241 m (4,101–7,352 ft).

== Conservation ==
Bolitoglossa palmata is classified as being of least concern by the IUCN due to its large range and population, which is thought to be stable. It is threatened by habitat loss due to agriculture, logging, and mining. It is found in several national parks, including national parks of Sumaco Napo-Galeras, Llanganates, and Sangay.
