= Gómez's web-footed salamander =

Conservation status
- Endangered (IUCN 3.1)

Scientific classification
- Kingdom: Animalia
- Phylum: Chordata
- Class: Amphibia
- Order: Urodela
- Family: Plethodontidae
- Genus: Bolitoglossa
- Species: B. gomezi

Binomial name
- Bolitoglossa gomezi Wake, Savage & Hanken, 2007

Species of amphibian

Gomez's web-footed salamander (Bolitoglossa gomezi) is a species of salamander in the family Plethodontidae. It is found in Costa Rica and Panama. Its natural habitat is subtropical or tropical moist lowland forests.
