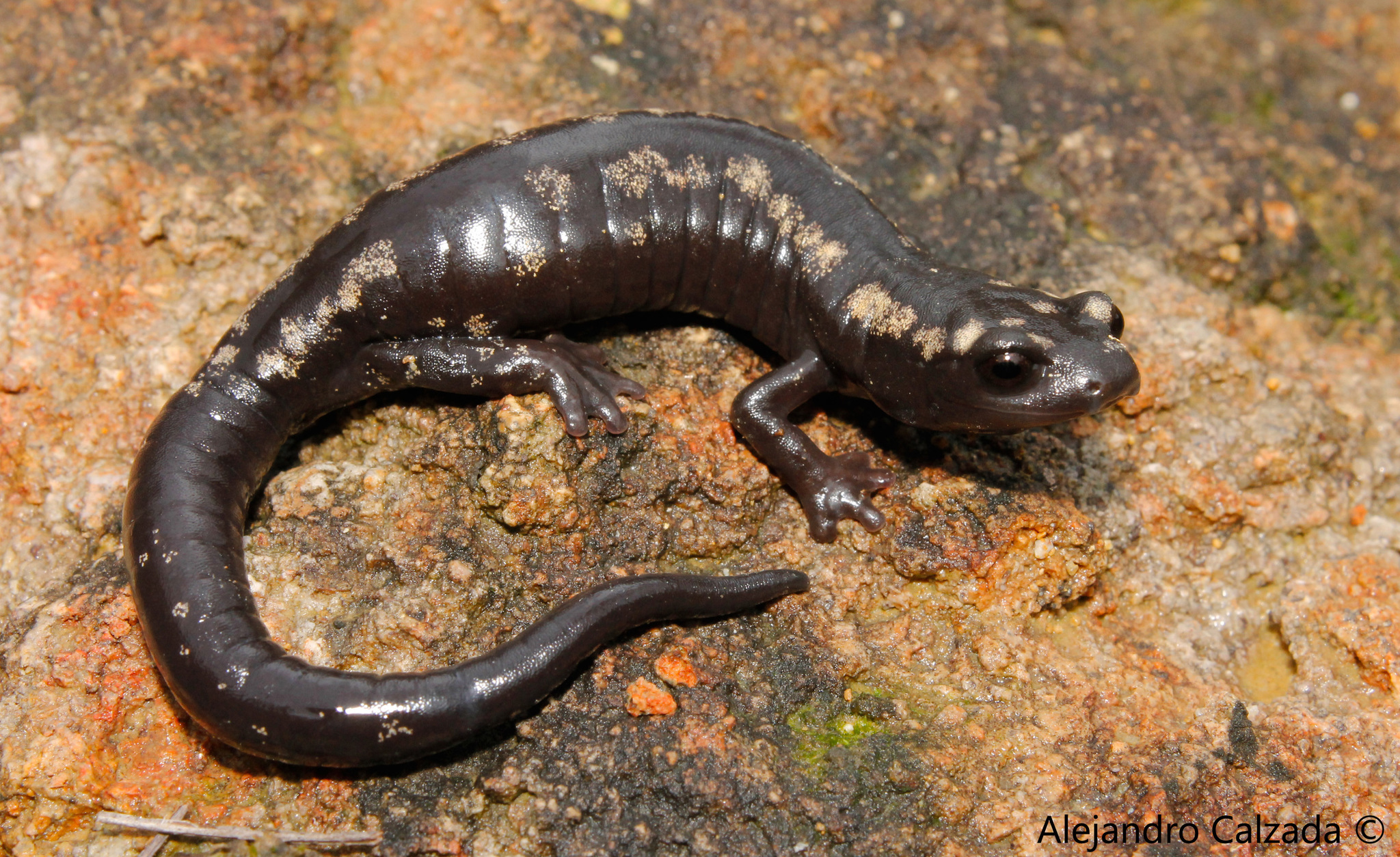
- B. zapoteca in Oaxaca, Mexico

Conservation status
- Endangered (IUCN 3.1)

Scientific classification
- Kingdom: Animalia
- Phylum: Chordata
- Class: Amphibia
- Order: Urodela
- Family: Plethodontidae
- Genus: Bolitoglossa
- Species: B. zapoteca

Binomial name
- Bolitoglossa zapoteca Parra-Olea, Garcia-Paris & Wake, 2002

= Zapotec salamander =

Species of amphibian

The Zapotec salamander (Bolitoglossa zapoteca) is a species of salamander in the family Plethodontidae.

It is endemic to the eastern Sierra Madre del Sur in Oaxaca, Mexico, where it is known from two locations – near Quiegolani and on Cerro Piedra Larga, around 1,875 meters elevation. Its extent of occurrence (EOO) is 435 km^{2}.

Its natural habitat is montane pine–oak forest and heavily degraded former forest. It is threatened by habitat loss.
