= Bolitoglossa tatamae =

Conservation status
- Endangered (IUCN 3.1)

Scientific classification
- Kingdom: Animalia
- Phylum: Chordata
- Class: Amphibia
- Order: Urodela
- Family: Plethodontidae
- Genus: Bolitoglossa
- Species: B. tatamae

Binomial name
- Bolitoglossa tatamae Acosta-Galvis & Hoyos, 2006

Species of salamander

Bolitoglossa tatamae is a species of salamander in the family Plethodontidae.

It is endemic to Colombia. Its natural habitat includes montane humid forests. It is threatened by habitat loss.
