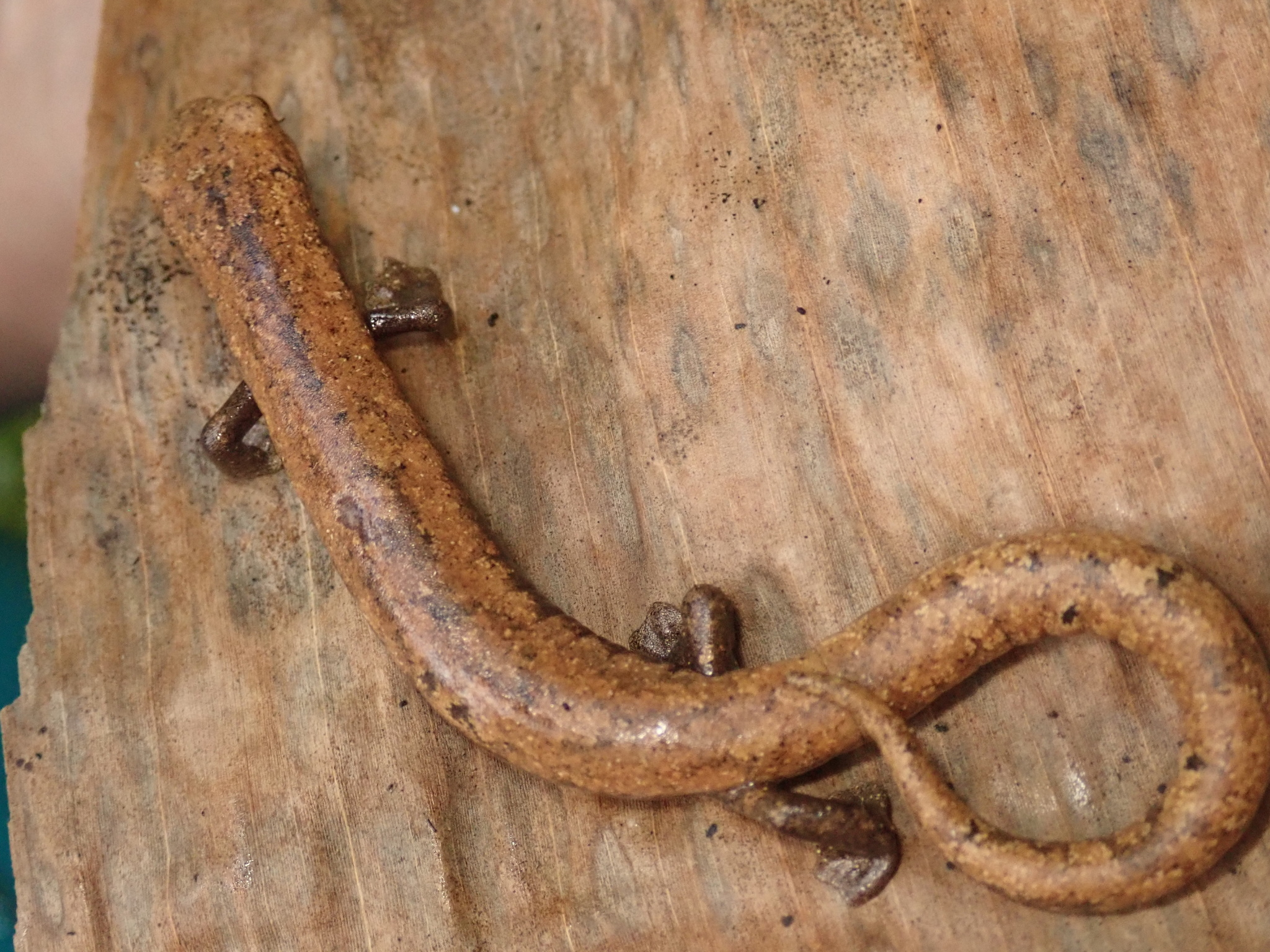

Conservation status
- Least Concern (IUCN 3.1)

Scientific classification
- Kingdom: Animalia
- Phylum: Chordata
- Class: Amphibia
- Order: Urodela
- Family: Plethodontidae
- Genus: Bolitoglossa
- Species: B. lignicolor

Binomial name
- Bolitoglossa lignicolor (Peters, 1873)

Synonyms
- Bolitoglossa palustris Taylor, 1949; Oedipus ahli Unterstein, 1930; Spelerpes punctatum Brocchi, 1883

= Camron climbing salamander =

Species of amphibian

The Camron climbing salamander (Bolitoglossa lignicolor), also known as the Camron mushroomtongue salamander or wood colored salamander, is a species of salamander in the family Plethodontidae. It is found in Costa Rica and Panama. Its natural habitat is subtropical or tropical moist lowland forests. It is threatened by habitat loss.
