= Cordillera Talamanca salamander =

Conservation status
- Endangered (IUCN 3.1)

Scientific classification
- Kingdom: Animalia
- Phylum: Chordata
- Class: Amphibia
- Order: Urodela
- Family: Plethodontidae
- Genus: Bolitoglossa
- Species: B. sooyorum

Binomial name
- Bolitoglossa sooyorum Vial, 1953

Species of amphibian

The Cordillera Talamanca salamander (Bolitoglossa sooyorum) is a species of salamander in the family Plethodontidae. It is found in Costa Rica and possibly Panama. Its natural habitat is subtropical or tropical moist montane forests. It is threatened by habitat loss.
