= Tapantí giant salamander =

Conservation status
- Data Deficient (IUCN 3.1)

Scientific classification
- Kingdom: Animalia
- Phylum: Chordata
- Class: Amphibia
- Order: Urodela
- Family: Plethodontidae
- Genus: Bolitoglossa
- Species: B. obscura

Binomial name
- Bolitoglossa obscura Hanken, Wake & Savage, 2005

Species of amphibian

The Tapantí giant salamander (Bolitoglossa obscura) is a species of salamander in the family Plethodontidae. It is endemic to Costa Rica. Its natural habitat is subtropical or tropical moist montane forests.
