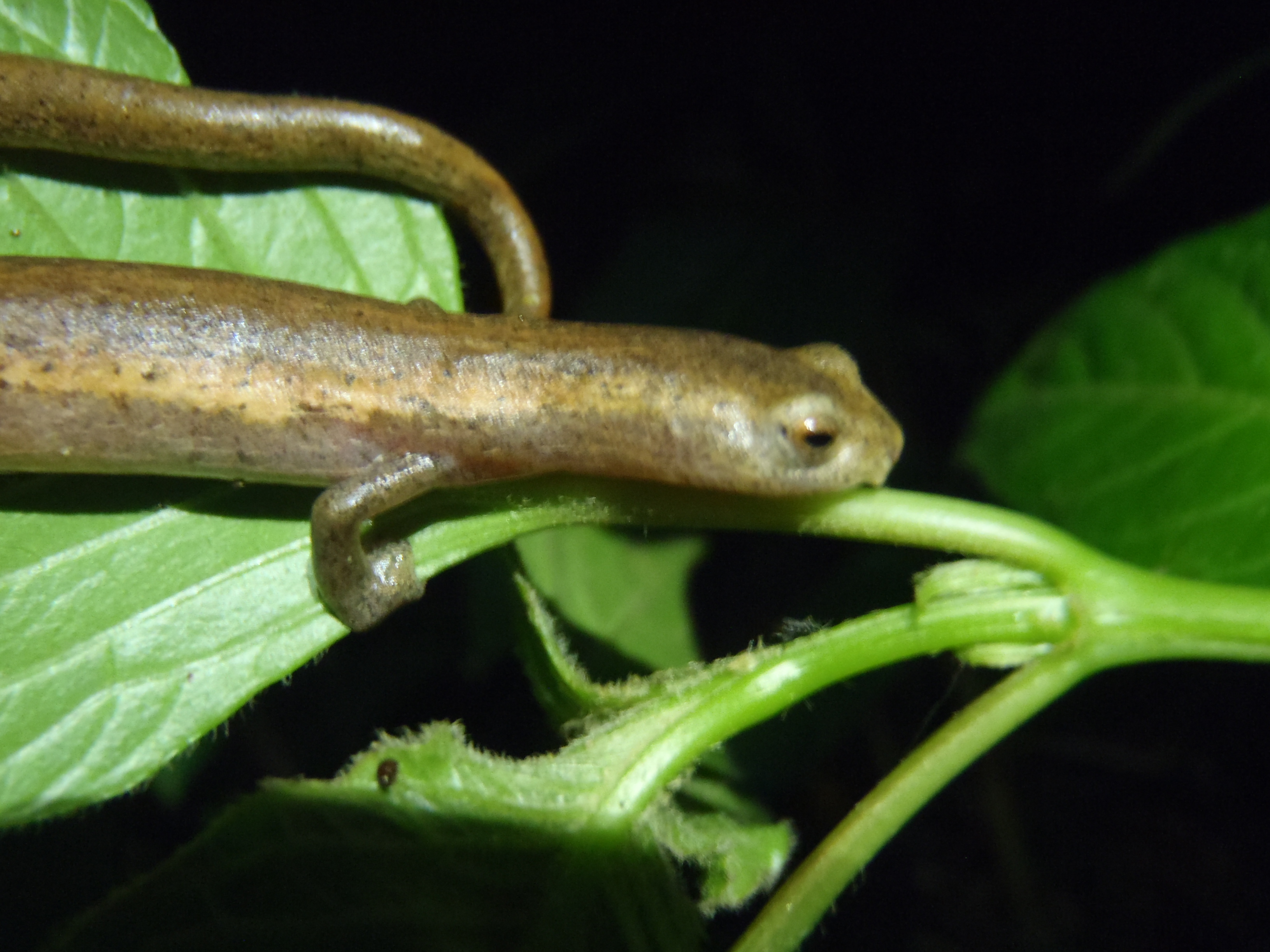

Conservation status
- Vulnerable (IUCN 3.1)

Scientific classification
- Kingdom: Animalia
- Phylum: Chordata
- Class: Amphibia
- Order: Urodela
- Family: Plethodontidae
- Genus: Bolitoglossa
- Species: B. mombachoensis

Binomial name
- Bolitoglossa mombachoensis Köhler & McCranie, 1999

= Bolitoglossa mombachoensis =

Species of salamander

Bolitoglossa mombachoensis (Spanish: Salamandra De Mombacho) is a species of salamander in the family Plethodontidae. It is commonly known in English as the Mombacho salamander.

It is endemic to Nicaragua. This species is known only from Volcán Mombacho, Granada Department, at 950–1,250m above sea level. It might occur on other volcanoes in south-western Nicaragua. Its natural habitats are subtropical or tropical moist lowland forests, subtropical or tropical moist montane forests, and heavily degraded former forest. It is threatened by habitat loss.
