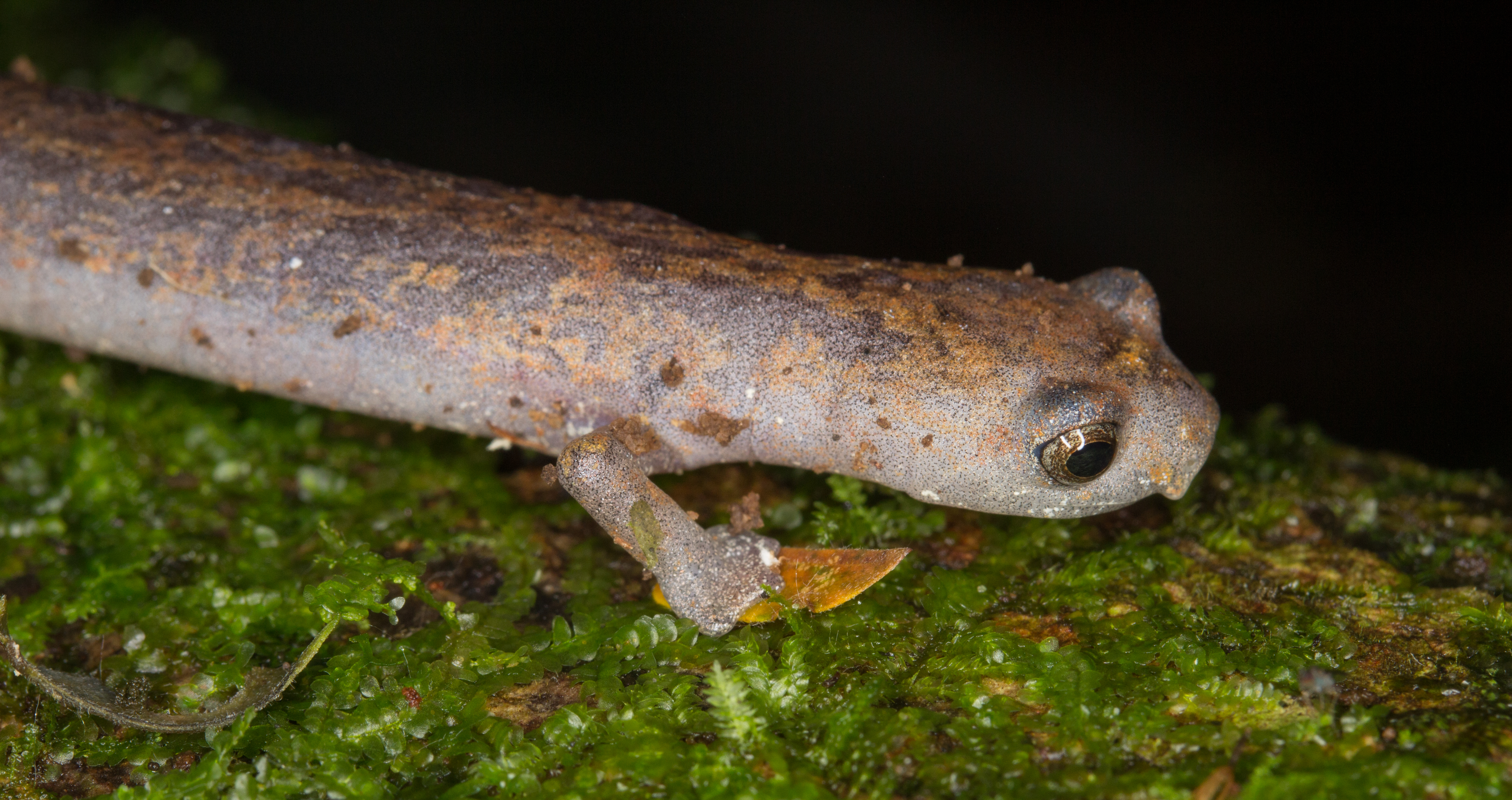

Conservation status
- Least Concern (IUCN 3.1)

Scientific classification
- Kingdom: Animalia
- Phylum: Chordata
- Class: Amphibia
- Order: Urodela
- Family: Plethodontidae
- Genus: Bolitoglossa
- Species: B. colonnea

Binomial name
- Bolitoglossa colonnea (Dunn, 1924)

= La Loma salamander =

Species of amphibian

The La Loma salamander (Bolitoglossa colonnea) is a species of salamander in the family Plethodontidae. It is found in Costa Rica and western Panama. The common name refers to La Loma, its type locality on the trail between Chiriquicito and Boquete, earlier in the Bocas del Toro Province but at present in the Ngäbe-Buglé Comarca, Panama. Its natural habitats are humid lowland and montane forests. It is largely an arboreal species living in bromeliads, but it can be found on the ground too. It is threatened by habitat loss.
