= Rilett's climbing salamander =

Conservation status
- Endangered (IUCN 3.1)

Scientific classification
- Kingdom: Animalia
- Phylum: Chordata
- Class: Amphibia
- Order: Urodela
- Family: Plethodontidae
- Genus: Bolitoglossa
- Species: B. riletti

Binomial name
- Bolitoglossa riletti Holman, 1964

Species of amphibian

Rilett's climbing salamander (Bolitoglossa riletti), commonly known as Rilett's mushroomtongue salamander or simply Rilett's salamander, is a species of salamander in the family Plethodontidae. It is endemic to Mexico and only known from the vicinity of its type locality around Putla in the Sierra Madre del Sur of western Oaxaca, from 800 to 1,400 meters elevation. It inhabits secondary tropical semi-deciduous forest, and also shaded banana and coffee plantations. It is an arboreal salamander, most often found in the leaf axils of red banana trees and other large-leaved plants. Despite living in modified habitats, it is threatened by changing agricultural practices.
