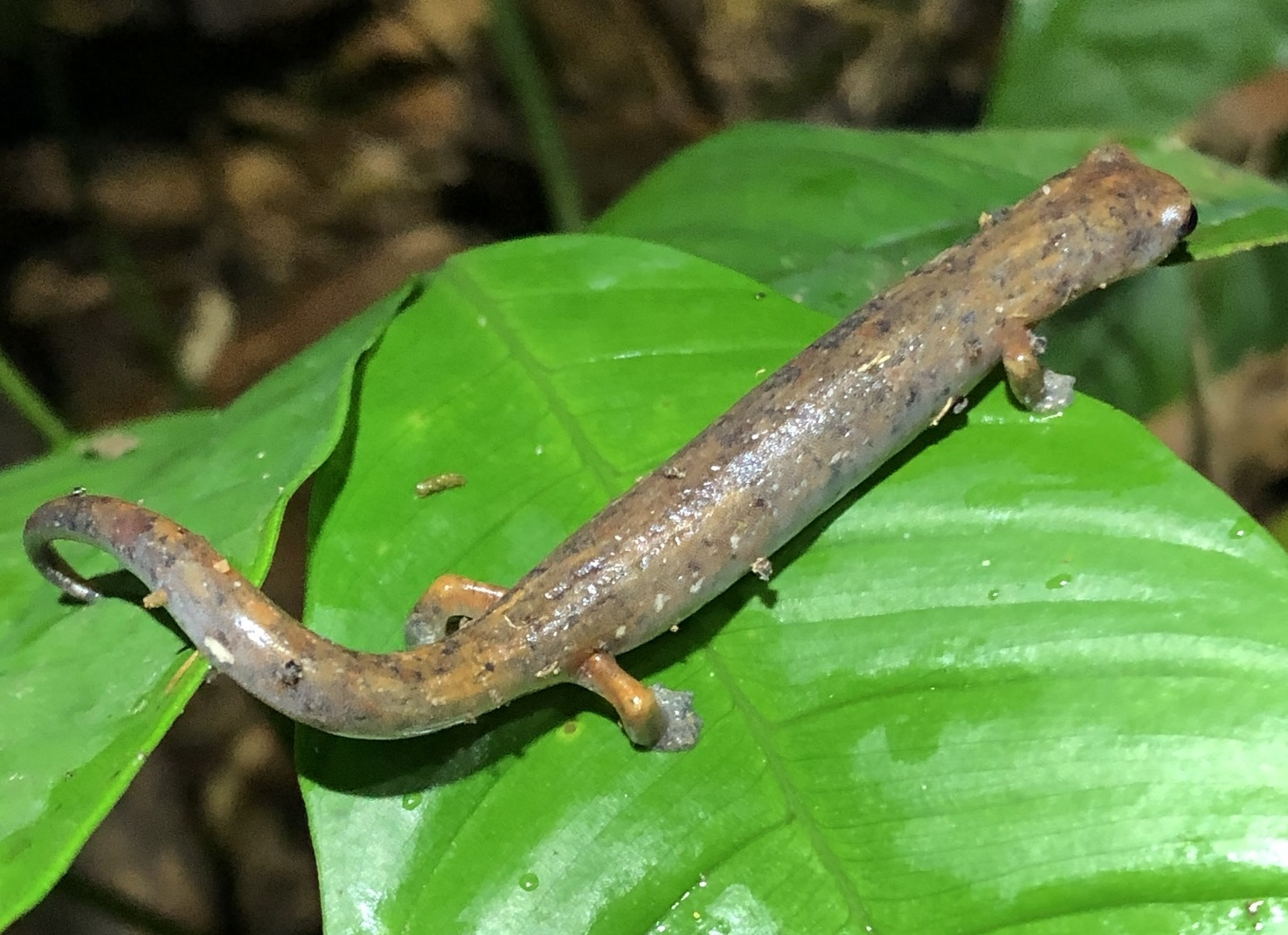
- Bolitoglossa caldwellae in the Amarakaeri Communal Reserve, Peru

Conservation status
- Least Concern (IUCN 3.1)

Scientific classification
- Kingdom: Animalia
- Phylum: Chordata
- Class: Amphibia
- Order: Urodela
- Family: Plethodontidae
- Genus: Bolitoglossa
- Species: B. caldwellae

Binomial name
- Bolitoglossa caldwellae Brcko, Hoogmoed, and Neckel-Oliveira, 2013

Synonyms
- Bolitoglossa (Eladinea) caldwellae Raffaëlli, 2013

= Bolitoglossa caldwellae =

Species of salamander

Bolitoglossa caldwellae, or Caldwell's mushroomtongue salamander, is a species of salamander from the family Plethodontidae. This species is known to occur in western Brazil in the states of Acre and Amazonas.

In 2021 the IUCN SSC Amphibian Specialist Group determined Bolitoglossa caldwellae to be a least-concern species. It is threatened by habitat loss.
