= Pará climbing salamander =

Conservation status
- Least Concern (IUCN 3.1)

Scientific classification
- Kingdom: Animalia
- Phylum: Chordata
- Class: Amphibia
- Order: Urodela
- Family: Plethodontidae
- Genus: Bolitoglossa
- Species: B. paraensis

Binomial name
- Bolitoglossa paraensis [Unterstein, 1930]

Species of amphibian

The Pará climbing salamander (Bolitoglossa paraensis), also known as the Pará Mushroom-tongue salamander, or Nauta Mushroom-tongue salamander, is a species of salamander in the family Plethodontidae. It is native to Brazil.

Its natural habitat includes lowland rain forests. While a Least-concern species, its population is decreasing as a result of habitat loss (deforestation) caused by urban growth in the region of Belém.
