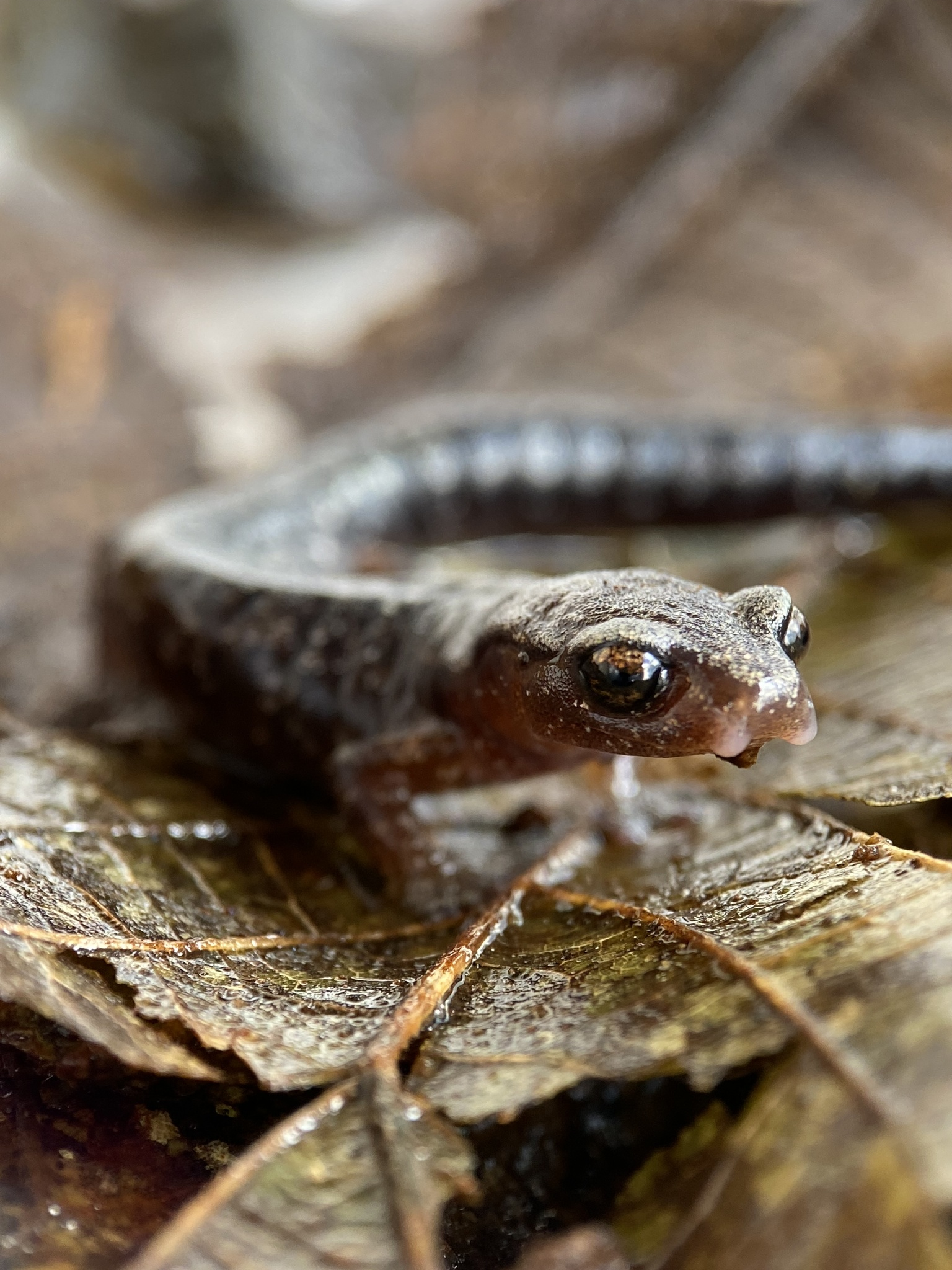

Conservation status
- Critically Endangered (IUCN 3.1)

Scientific classification
- Kingdom: Animalia
- Phylum: Chordata
- Class: Amphibia
- Order: Urodela
- Family: Plethodontidae
- Genus: Bolitoglossa
- Species: B. synoria

Binomial name
- Bolitoglossa synoria McCranie & Köhler, 1999

= Cerro Pital salamander =

Species of amphibian

The Cerro Pital salamander (Bolitoglossa synoria) is a species of salamander in the family Plethodontidae. It is a medium-sized salamander for its genus, growing to a snout–vent length of 37.4–52.0 mm (1.47–2.05 in). They have dark grayish-brown uppersides and pale brown undersides with whitish spots. It is found around the mountain of Cerro El Pital on the Honduras-El Salvador border. It inhabits cloud forests at elevations of 2,150 to 2,750 m (7,050 to 9,020 ft). It is classified as being critically endangered by the IUCN due to its small range and ongoing habitat degradation.

== Taxonomy ==
Specimens belonging to Bolitoglossa synoria had been collected as early as 1976, but were misidentified as belonging to B. dunni and B. celaque. Bolitoglossa synoria was formally described in 1999 based on an adult male specimen collected from the north slope of Cerro El Pital in Honduras in 1997. The species is named the Greek word meaning 'borderland', referring to the species' distribution along the Honduras-El Salvador border. The species has the English common name Pital mushroomtongue salamander. In Spanish, it is known as the Salamandra Pitalense.

It is placed within the subgenus Magnadigita, in the Bolitoglossa dunni species group.

== Description ==
Bolitoglossa synoria is a medium-sized salamander for its genus, growing to a snout–vent length of 37.4–52.0 mm (1.47–2.05 in). Males have dark grayish-brown uppersides and pale brown undersides with whitish spots. The sides are dark grayish-brown with clay-colored markings. The underside of the tail is dark grayish-brown.

== Distribution and habitat ==
Bolitoglossa synoria is found on the mountain of Cerro El Pital on the Honduras-El Salvador border. In Honduras, it is also found in the Güisayote Biological Reserve, slightly northeast of Cerro El Pital proper. It inhabits cloud forests at elevations of 2,150 to 2,750 m (7,050 to 9,020 ft).

== Conservation ==
Bolitoglossa synoria is classified as being critically endangered by the IUCN due to its small range (estimated to be 99 km^{2}) which is facing ongoing habitat degradation. The species requires good forest cover and does not seem to withstand human disturbance of its habitat well. Currently, it is threatened by habitat loss due to agricultural expansion, increased coffee cultivation, wildfires, road construction, and increasing human activity in its range. Humans visiting Cerro El Pital collect large amounts of wood to use as fuel, eliminating the species' microhabitat. The species is threatened by climate change, which affects its preferred cloud forest habitats especially severely. It is also threatened by pesticide and herbicide use. Both localities in Honduras are located in protected areas, but the El Salvadoran portion of the range is in a privately protected area which is under intense anthropogenic pressure.
