= Bolitoglossa pesrubra =

Conservation status
- Least Concern (IUCN 3.1)

Scientific classification
- Kingdom: Animalia
- Phylum: Chordata
- Class: Amphibia
- Order: Urodela
- Family: Plethodontidae
- Genus: Bolitoglossa
- Species: B. pesrubra

Binomial name
- Bolitoglossa pesrubra (Taylor, 1952)

Species of salamander

Bolitoglossa pesrubra is a species of salamander in the family Plethodontidae. It is endemic to Cordillera de Talamanca, Costa Rica.

Its natural habitat is tropical moist montane forests. It is threatened by habitat loss.
