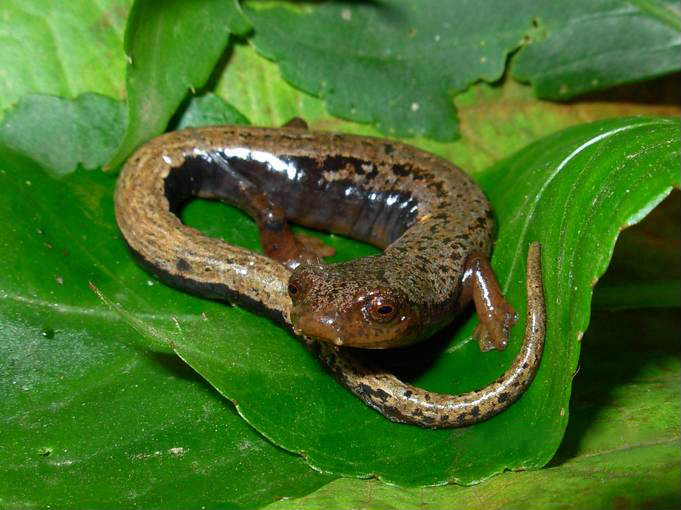

Conservation status
- Least Concern (IUCN 3.1)

Scientific classification
- Kingdom: Animalia
- Phylum: Chordata
- Class: Amphibia
- Order: Urodela
- Family: Plethodontidae
- Genus: Bolitoglossa
- Species: B. vallecula

Binomial name
- Bolitoglossa vallecula Brame & Wake, 1963

= Yarumal climbing salamander =

Species of amphibian

The Yarumal climbing salamander (Bolitoglossa vallecula) is a species of salamander in the family Plethodontidae. It is endemic to Colombia.

Its natural habitats are subtropical or tropical moist montane forests, subtropical or tropical high-altitude grassland, pastureland, and heavily degraded former forest.
