= Guerreran climbing salamander =

Conservation status
- Least Concern (IUCN 3.1)

Scientific classification
- Kingdom: Animalia
- Phylum: Chordata
- Class: Amphibia
- Order: Urodela
- Family: Plethodontidae
- Genus: Bolitoglossa
- Species: B. hermosa

Binomial name
- Bolitoglossa hermosa Papenfuss, Wake & Adler, 1983 (1984)

Species of amphibian

The Guerreran climbing salamander (Bolitoglossa hermosa) is a species of salamander in the family Plethodontidae. It is endemic to Mexico. It is found on the Pacific slope of the Sierra Madre del Sur in the basins of the Atoyac and Tecpan rivers, between 765 and 2,800 meters elevation. Its extent of occurrence (EOO) is 1,122 km^{2}.

Its natural habitats are subtropical or tropical moist lowland forests, subtropical or tropical moist montane forests, plantations, and rural gardens.

It is threatened by habitat loss.
