= Bolitoglossa aurae =

Conservation status
- Data Deficient (IUCN 3.1)

Scientific classification
- Kingdom: Animalia
- Phylum: Chordata
- Class: Amphibia
- Order: Urodela
- Family: Plethodontidae
- Genus: Bolitoglossa
- Species: B. aurae

Binomial name
- Bolitoglossa aurae Kubicki & Arias, 2016

Species of amphibian

Bolitoglossa aurae, commonly known as Aura's golden salamander, is a lungless salamander found in the rainforests of Cordillera de Talamanca in Costa Rica. This species is part of the Bolitoglossa genus, commonly known as mushroom-tongued salamanders.

== Description ==
Bolitoglossa aurae has a light yellow color with a dark brown dorsal stripe running down the head through the body and a pair of thin dark brown lateral stripes running from behind the eyes to the tail. The species has long prehensile tails relative to other mushroom-tongued salamanders. Its tail is 57.9% of its total length.

== Habitat and dispersal ==
Aura's golden salamander is believed to be an endemic species of Costa Rica but its range is not currently known. The mid-elevation slopes of northeastern Cordillera de Talamanca are the only known environment inhabited by Bolitoglossa aurae. Aura's golden salamander inhabits cloud forests.

== Behavior ==
Bolitoglossa aurae is nocturnal and burrows during the day.
