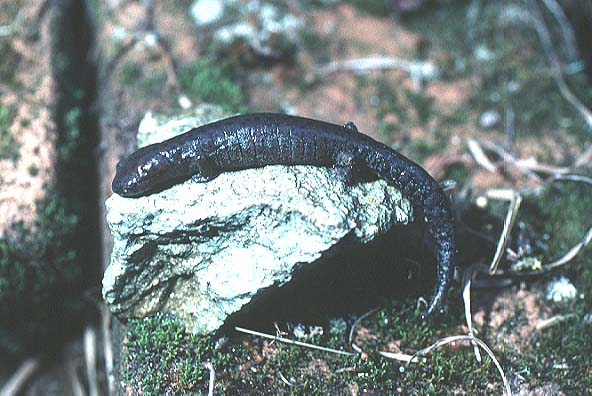

Conservation status
- Endangered (IUCN 3.1)

Scientific classification
- Kingdom: Animalia
- Phylum: Chordata
- Class: Amphibia
- Order: Urodela
- Family: Plethodontidae
- Genus: Bolitoglossa
- Species: B. heiroreias

Binomial name
- Bolitoglossa heiroreias Greenbaum, 2004

= Holy-mountain salamander =

Species of amphibian

The Holy-mountain salamander (Bolitoglossa heiroreias) is a species of salamander in the family Plethodontidae. It is found in El Salvador, Guatemala, and possibly Honduras. Its natural habitat is subtropical or tropical moist montane forests. It is threatened by habitat loss.
