= Quebrada Valverde salamander =

Conservation status
- Least Concern (IUCN 3.1)

Scientific classification
- Kingdom: Animalia
- Phylum: Chordata
- Class: Amphibia
- Order: Urodela
- Family: Plethodontidae
- Genus: Bolitoglossa
- Species: B. diminuta

Binomial name
- Bolitoglossa diminuta Robinson, 1976

Species of amphibian

The Quebrada Valverde salamander (Bolitoglossa diminuta) is a species of salamander in the family Plethodontidae. It is endemic to Costa Rica. Its natural habitat is subtropical or tropical moist montane forests.
