= Northwestern climbing salamander =

Conservation status
- Least Concern (IUCN 3.1)

Scientific classification
- Kingdom: Animalia
- Phylum: Chordata
- Class: Amphibia
- Order: Urodela
- Family: Plethodontidae
- Genus: Bolitoglossa
- Species: B. sima

Binomial name
- Bolitoglossa sima (Vaillant, 1911)

Synonyms
- Spelerpes simus Vaillant, 1911

Species of amphibian

The northwestern climbing salamander (Bolitoglossa sima), also known as the northwestern mushroomtongue salamander, is a species of salamander in the family Plethodontidae. It is endemic to Ecuador and found in the northwestern lowlands of the country at elevations below 1,000 m (3,300 ft) asl. It has been recorded in dense wet forest and in a grassy field, cleared for cattle grazing, although it is not known whether it could adapt to human-altered habitats. Agriculture and logging are threats to its habitat. It has been found in the Cotacachi Cayapas Ecological Reserve.
