= Brame's climbing salamander =

Conservation status
- Least Concern (IUCN 3.1)

Scientific classification
- Kingdom: Animalia
- Phylum: Chordata
- Class: Amphibia
- Order: Urodela
- Family: Plethodontidae
- Genus: Bolitoglossa
- Species: B. bramei

Binomial name
- Bolitoglossa bramei Wake, Savage, and Hanken, 2007

Species of amphibian

Brame's climbing salamander (Bolitoglossa bramei) is a species of salamander in the family Plethodontidae. It is found in Costa Rica and Panama, particularly the Pacific and Atlantic slopes of Cordillera de Talamanca and ranging to Cerro Pando, Chiriquí Province and Volcán Barú. Its natural habitat is subtropical or tropical moist lowland forests and has been recorded between 1,900 and 2,300 meters above sea level. It has not been commonly recorded so nothing is known about its population. No threats are known and its habitat is currently under protection by Las Tablas protected area and Reserva de la Biósfera de La Amistad.
