= Millville climbing salamander =

Conservation status
- Least Concern (IUCN 3.1)

Scientific classification
- Kingdom: Animalia
- Phylum: Chordata
- Class: Amphibia
- Order: Urodela
- Family: Plethodontidae
- Genus: Bolitoglossa
- Species: B. cerroensis

Binomial name
- Bolitoglossa cerroensis (Taylor, 1952)

Species of amphibian

The Millville climbing salamander (Bolitoglossa cerroensis) is a species of salamander in the family Plethodontidae. It is endemic to Costa Rica. Its natural habitat is subtropical or tropical moist montane forests. It is threatened by habitat loss.
