= Veracruz salamander =

Conservation status
- Endangered (IUCN 3.1)

Scientific classification
- Kingdom: Animalia
- Phylum: Chordata
- Class: Amphibia
- Order: Urodela
- Family: Plethodontidae
- Genus: Bolitoglossa
- Species: B. veracrucis

Binomial name
- Bolitoglossa veracrucis Taylor, 1951

Species of amphibian

The Veracruz salamander (Bolitoglossa veracrucis), also known as the Veracruz mushroomtongue salamander, is a species of salamander in the family Plethodontidae. It is endemic to Mexico and known from southern Veracruz, north-eastern Oaxaca, and north-western Chiapas. Its natural habitats are tropical lowland forests, but it occurs also in disturbed habitats. It might be a habitat specialist of limestone outcrops. It is threatened by opening of its habitat by expanding agriculture and wood extraction.
