= Bolitoglossa borburata =

Conservation status
- Vulnerable (IUCN 3.1)

Scientific classification
- Kingdom: Animalia
- Phylum: Chordata
- Class: Amphibia
- Order: Urodela
- Family: Plethodontidae
- Genus: Bolitoglossa
- Species: B. borburata

Binomial name
- Bolitoglossa borburata Trapido, 1942

Species of salamander

Bolitoglossa borburata, commonly known as the carabobo mushroomtongue, is a species of salamander in the family Plethodontidae. It is endemic to Venezuela. Its natural habitat is subtropical or tropical moist montane forests.

The carabobo mushroomtongue has a snout–vent length of 5.5 cm (2.2 in) and it is robust with a large and truncated snout, short limbs, and webbed fingers and toes.
