= Zacapa salamander =

Conservation status
- Vulnerable (IUCN 3.1)

Scientific classification
- Kingdom: Animalia
- Phylum: Chordata
- Class: Amphibia
- Order: Urodela
- Family: Plethodontidae
- Genus: Bolitoglossa
- Species: B. zacapensis

Binomial name
- Bolitoglossa zacapensis Rovito, Vásquez-Almazán & Papenfuss, 2010

Species of amphibian

The Zacapa salamander (Bolitoglossa zacapensis) is a species of salamander in the family Plethodontidae. It is endemic to Guatemala.

== Additional sources ==
- Rovito, Vásquez-Almazán & Papenfuss, 2010 : A new species of Bolitoglossa from the Sierra de las Minas, Guatemala. Journal of Herpetology, p. 44, n. 4, p. 516-525.
- Rovito, S.M, 2011: Bolitoglossa zacapensis. Information on amphibian biology and conservation. [web application]. Berkeley, California: Bolitoglossa zacapensis. AmphibiaWeb. Downloaded on 16 October 2012.
