= Atoyac web-footed salamander =

Conservation status
- Endangered (IUCN 3.1)

Scientific classification
- Kingdom: Animalia
- Phylum: Chordata
- Class: Amphibia
- Order: Urodela
- Family: Plethodontidae
- Genus: Bolitoglossa
- Species: B. oaxacensis

Binomial name
- Bolitoglossa oaxacensis Parra-Olea, Garcia-Paris & Wake, 2002

Species of amphibian

The Atoyac web-footed salamander (Bolitoglossa oaxacensis) is a species of salamander in the family Plethodontidae. It is endemic to Mexico. Its natural habitats are subtropical or tropical moist montane forests and heavily degraded former forest. It is threatened by habitat loss.
