= Winter climbing salamander =

Conservation status
- Vulnerable (IUCN 3.1)

Scientific classification
- Kingdom: Animalia
- Phylum: Chordata
- Class: Amphibia
- Order: Urodela
- Family: Plethodontidae
- Genus: Bolitoglossa
- Species: B. hiemalis

Binomial name
- Bolitoglossa hiemalis Lynch, 2001

Species of amphibian

The winter climbing salamander (Bolitoglossa hiemalis) is a species of salamander in the family Plethodontidae. It is endemic to Colombia. Its natural habitat is subtropical or tropical high-altitude grassland.
