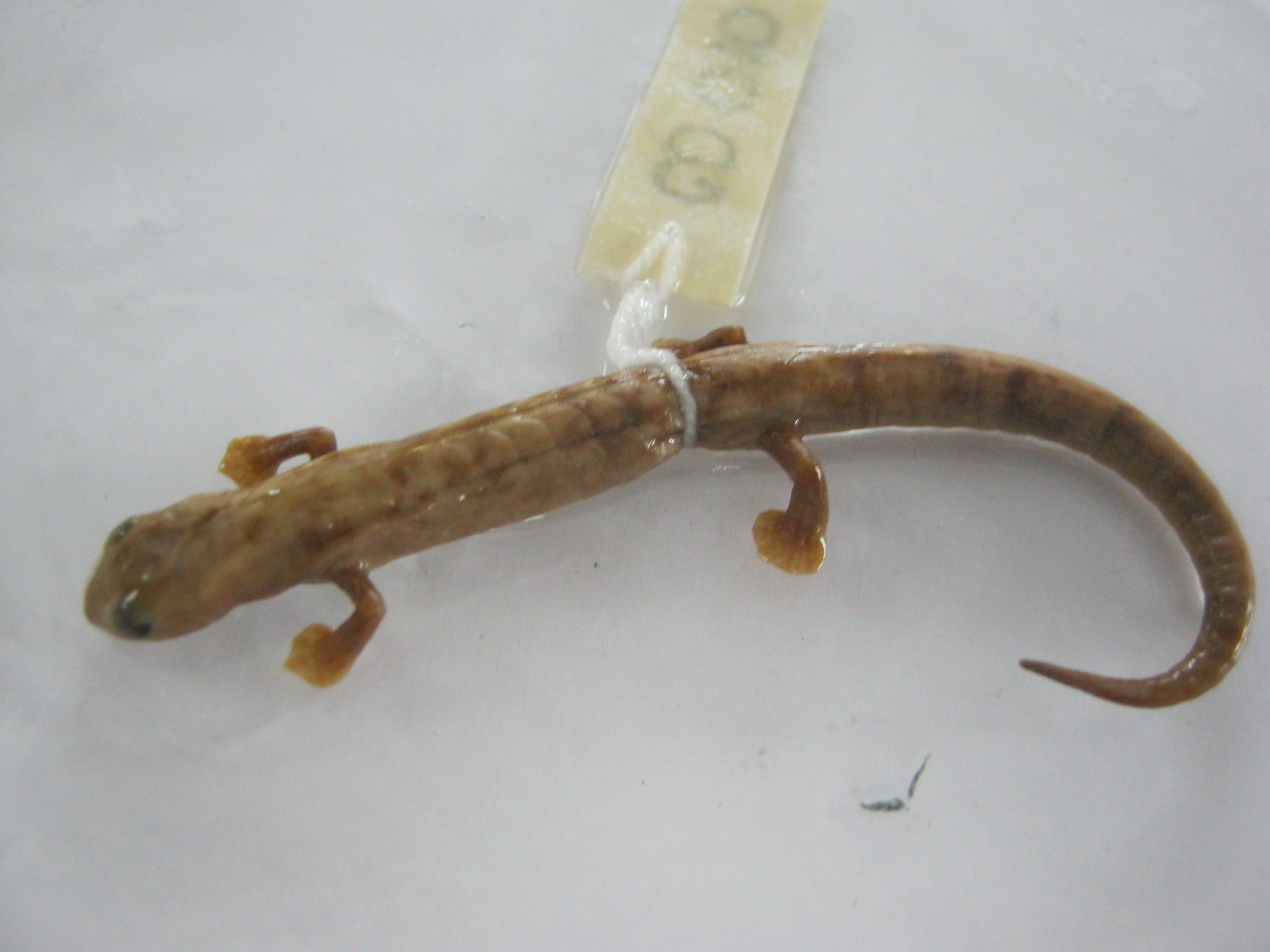

Conservation status
- Least Concern (IUCN 3.1)

Scientific classification
- Kingdom: Animalia
- Phylum: Chordata
- Class: Amphibia
- Order: Urodela
- Family: Plethodontidae
- Genus: Bolitoglossa
- Species: B. biseriata

Binomial name
- Bolitoglossa biseriata Tanner, 1962

= Two-lined climbing salamander =

Species of amphibian

The two-lined climbing salamander (Bolitoglossa biseriata), also known as the two-lined mushroomtongue salamander, is a species of salamander in the family Plethodontidae. It is found in Panama, western Colombia and northwestern Ecuador. Its natural habitat is humid lowland forest. It is arboreal, living in bromeliads and heliconias. It is threatened by habitat loss.
