= Magnificent web-footed salamander =

Conservation status
- Endangered (IUCN 3.1)

Scientific classification
- Kingdom: Animalia
- Phylum: Chordata
- Class: Amphibia
- Order: Urodela
- Family: Plethodontidae
- Genus: Bolitoglossa
- Species: B. magnifica

Binomial name
- Bolitoglossa magnifica Hanken, Wake & Savage, 2005

Species of amphibian

The magnificent web-footed salamander (Bolitoglossa magnifica) is a species of salamander in the family Plethodontidae.

It is endemic to Panama. Its natural habitat is subtropical or tropical moist montane forests. It is threatened by habitat loss.
