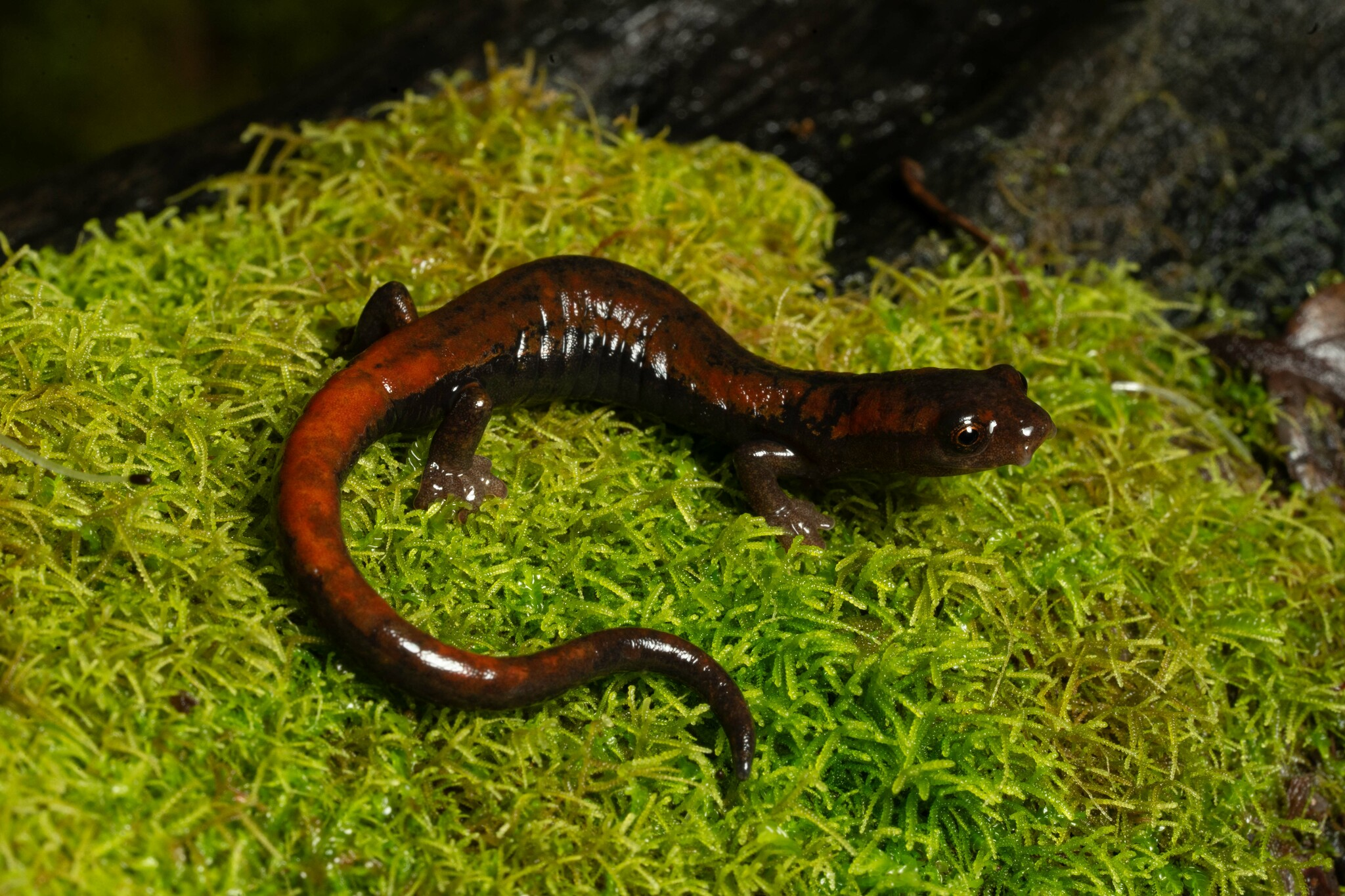

Conservation status
- Least Concern (IUCN 3.1)

Scientific classification
- Kingdom: Animalia
- Phylum: Chordata
- Class: Amphibia
- Order: Urodela
- Family: Plethodontidae
- Genus: Bolitoglossa
- Species: B. subpalmata

Binomial name
- Bolitoglossa subpalmata (Boulenger, 1896)

= La Palma salamander =

Species of amphibian

The La Palma salamander (Bolitoglossa subpalmata) is a species of salamander in the family Plethodontidae. It is found in Costa Rica and western Panama.

Its natural habitats are subtropical or tropical moist montane forests, pastureland, plantations, rural gardens, and heavily degraded former forest. The species occur at high elevations and cold temperatures atypical of habitats for most other plethodontids. It is threatened by habitat loss.
