= Pygmy web-footed salamander =

Conservation status
- Vulnerable (IUCN 3.1)

Scientific classification
- Kingdom: Animalia
- Phylum: Chordata
- Class: Amphibia
- Order: Urodela
- Family: Plethodontidae
- Genus: Bolitoglossa
- Species: B. pygmaea

Binomial name
- Bolitoglossa pygmaea Bolaños & Wake, 2009

Species of amphibian

The pygmy web-footed salamander (Bolitoglossa pygmaea) is a species of salamander in the family Plethodontidae. It is endemic to Costa Rica.
