= Robinson's web-footed salamander =

Conservation status
- Data Deficient (IUCN 3.1)

Scientific classification
- Kingdom: Animalia
- Phylum: Chordata
- Class: Amphibia
- Order: Urodela
- Family: Plethodontidae
- Genus: Bolitoglossa
- Species: B. robinsoni

Binomial name
- Bolitoglossa robinsoni Bolaños & Wake, 2009

Species of amphibian

Robinson's web-footed salamander (Bolitoglossa robinsoni) is a species of salamander in the family Plethodontidae. It can be found in Costa Rica and Panama.
