= Longest climbing salamander =

Conservation status
- Critically Endangered (IUCN 3.1)

Scientific classification
- Kingdom: Animalia
- Phylum: Chordata
- Class: Amphibia
- Order: Urodela
- Family: Plethodontidae
- Genus: Bolitoglossa
- Species: B. longissima

Binomial name
- Bolitoglossa longissima McCranie and Cruz-Díaz, 1996

Species of amphibian

The longest climbing salamander (Bolitoglossa longissima) is a species of salamander in the family Plethodontidae. It is endemic to Honduras. Its natural habitat is subtropical or tropical moist montane forests. It is threatened by habitat loss.
