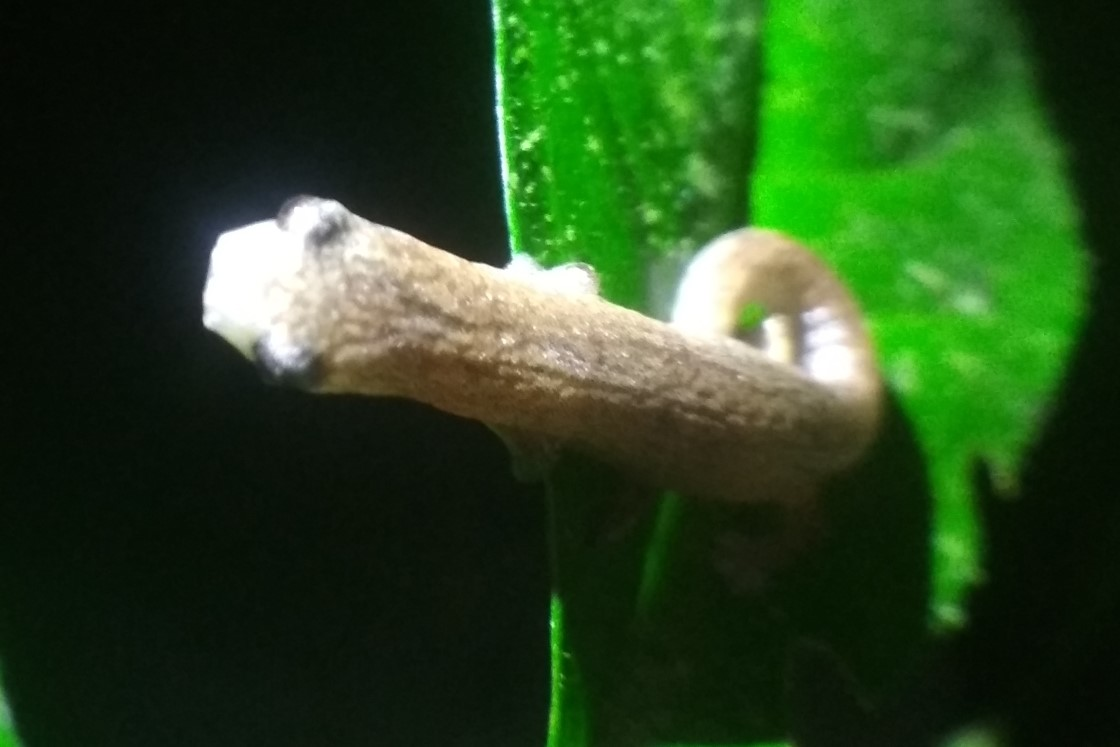

Conservation status
- Data Deficient (IUCN 3.1)

Scientific classification
- Kingdom: Animalia
- Phylum: Chordata
- Class: Amphibia
- Order: Urodela
- Family: Plethodontidae
- Genus: Bolitoglossa
- Species: B. peruviana

Binomial name
- Bolitoglossa peruviana (Boulenger, 1883)

= Bolitoglossa peruviana =

Species of salamander

Bolitoglossa peruviana is a species of salamander in the family Plethodontidae. It is found in Ecuador and Peru. Its natural habitats are subtropical or tropical moist lowland forests, plantations, and heavily degraded former forest.
