= Shadowy web-footed salamander =

Conservation status
- Near Threatened (IUCN 3.1)

Scientific classification
- Kingdom: Animalia
- Phylum: Chordata
- Class: Amphibia
- Order: Urodela
- Family: Plethodontidae
- Genus: Bolitoglossa
- Species: B. sombra

Binomial name
- Bolitoglossa sombra Hanken, Wake & Savage, 2005

Species of amphibian

The shadowy web-footed salamander (Bolitoglossa sombra) is a species of salamander belonging to the family Plethodontidae. Native to Costa Rica and possibly Panama, Its natural habitat is subtropical or tropical moist montane forests. This species faces threats from habitat loss.
