= Bolitoglossa copinhorum =

Conservation status
- Endangered (IUCN 3.1)

Scientific classification
- Kingdom: Animalia
- Phylum: Chordata
- Class: Amphibia
- Order: Urodela
- Family: Plethodontidae
- Genus: Bolitoglossa
- Species: B. copinhorum

Binomial name
- Bolitoglossa copinhorum Itgen, Sessions, Wilson, and Townsend, 2020

Species of amphibian

Bolitoglossa copinhorum, the Lenca mushroomtongue salamander, is a species of salamander in the family Plethodontidae. It is endemic to Honduras, and the species name recognizes the Council of Popular and Indigenous Organizations of Honduras (COPINH)'s environmental advocacy for the Lenca people that are indigenous to its habitat.
