= Bolitoglossa leandrae =

Conservation status
- Critically Endangered (IUCN 3.1)

Scientific classification
- Kingdom: Animalia
- Phylum: Chordata
- Class: Amphibia
- Order: Urodela
- Family: Plethodontidae
- Genus: Bolitoglossa
- Species: B. leandrae

Binomial name
- Bolitoglossa leandrae Acevedo, Wake, Márquez, Silva, Franco & Amézquita, 2013

Species of amphibian

Bolitoglossa leandrae, the Leandra salamander, is a species of salamander in the family Plethodontidae. The species is native to the rainforests of Venezuela and Colombia.

== Description ==
Bolitoglossa leandrae is nocturnal, sheltering under leaf litter during the day. It is relatively small and exhibits sexually dimorphic color patterns, with males being a darker shade of brown than females and featuring yellow dorsal stripes.

== Conservation status ==
Bolitoglossa leandrae was assessed as critically endangered by the IUCN in 2020, with the Colombian population believed to be possibly extinct. It is threatened by chytridiomycosis and agriculture related deforestation.
