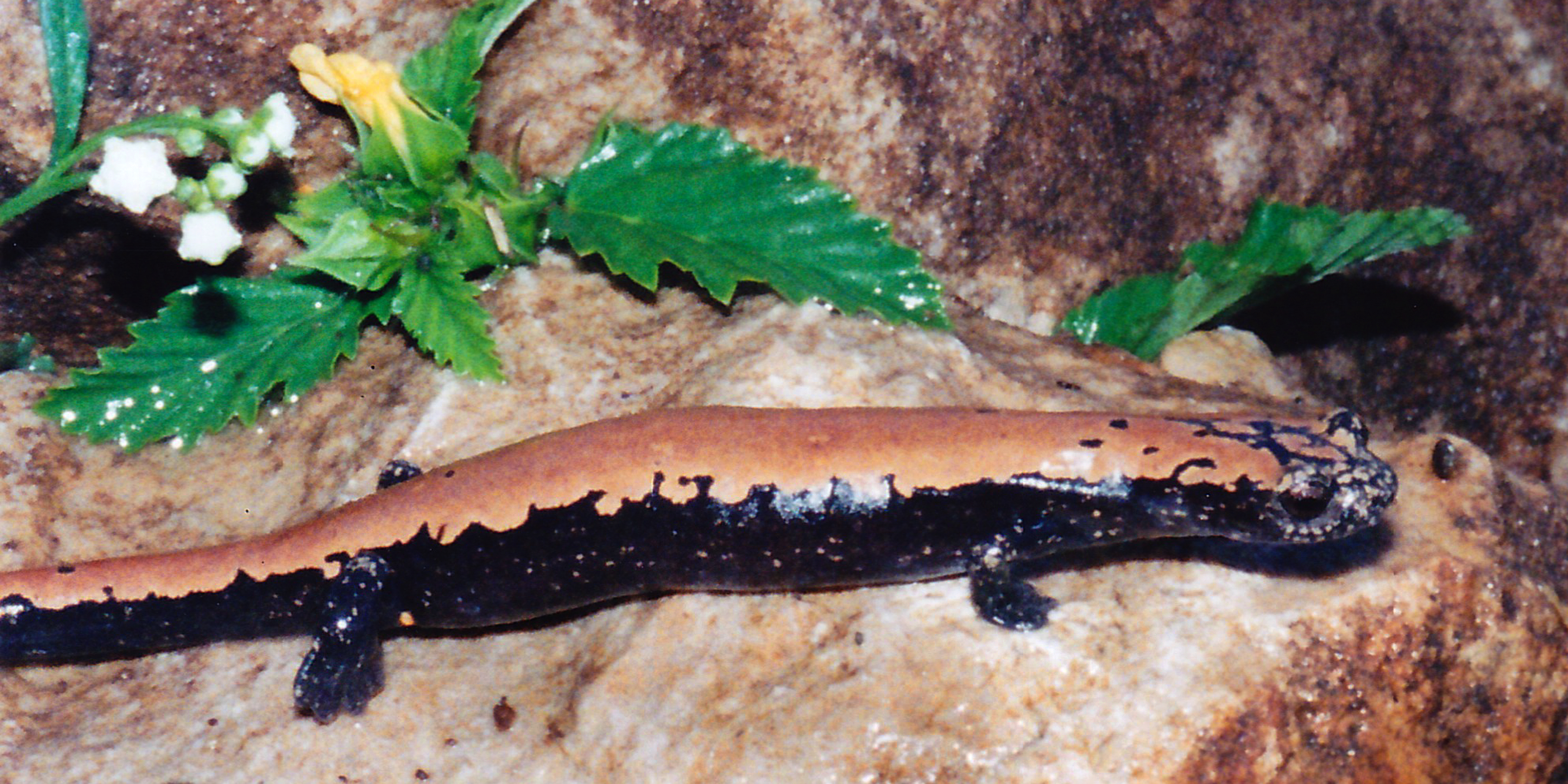
- Bolitoglossa platydactyla, Municipality of Ocampo, Tamaulipas, Mexico

Conservation status
- Least Concern (IUCN 3.1)

Scientific classification
- Kingdom: Animalia
- Phylum: Chordata
- Class: Amphibia
- Order: Urodela
- Family: Plethodontidae
- Genus: Bolitoglossa
- Species: B. platydactyla

Binomial name
- Bolitoglossa platydactyla (Gray, 1831)

Synonyms
- Salamandra variegata Bory, 1828

= Bolitoglossa platydactyla =

Species of salamander

Bolitoglossa platydactyla, commonly known as the broadfoot mushroomtongue salamander and broad-footed salamander, is a species of salamander in the family Plethodontidae. It is endemic to Mexico.

Its natural habitats are subtropical or tropical moist lowland forests, moist savanna, plantations, rural gardens, and urban areas. It is threatened by habitat loss.
