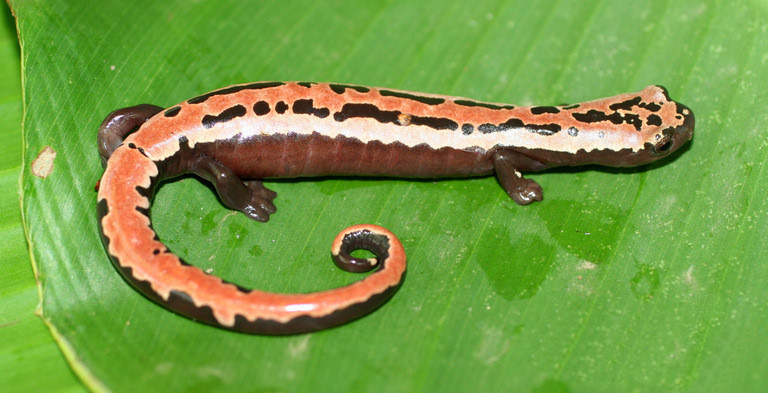
- Bolitoglossa mexicana

Scientific classification
- Kingdom: Animalia
- Phylum: Chordata
- Class: Amphibia
- Order: Urodela
- Family: Plethodontidae
- Subfamily: Hemidactyliinae
- Genus: Bolitoglossa; Duméril, Bibron & Duméril, 1854

Species
- c. 140, see text

= Bolitoglossa =

Genus of salamanders

Bolitoglossa is a genus of lungless salamanders, commonly called mushroom-tongued salamanders, tropical climbing salamanders, and web-footed salamanders, in the family Plethodontidae. Their combined geographic ranges extend from northern Mexico through Central America to Colombia, Venezuela, Ecuador, Peru, northeastern Brazil, and central Bolivia. Neotropical salamanders of the genus Bolitoglossa make up the largest genus in the order Caudata, consisting of approximately one-fifth of all known species of salamanders. Adult salamanders of the genus Bolitoglossa have a snout-to-vent length in the range of 45–200 mm (1.8–7.9 in) depending on the particular species. They are known for the ability to project the tongue to seize prey items. They are also known for webbed feet, having significantly more webbing than any other species outside their genus with the exception of the cave-dwelling Mexican bolitoglossine Chiropterotriton magnipes. Although webbed feet are a common characteristic of these salamanders, only about half of the species in this genus contain webbed feet.

== Characteristics ==
=== Hand and foot morphology ===
Hand and foot morphology is strikingly diverse in an otherwise morphologically uniform group. While just under half of these species contain webbing between their fingers and toes, the remaining species experience little to no webbing and undergo elongation of their fingers and toes throughout development. Ultimately, the variation of foot morphology within this genus is primarily due to natural selection. Derived characteristics correspond to arboreal vs. terrestrial salamanders.

- Webbed fingers – natural selection to improve terrestrial movement through water.
- Elongated fingers – natural selection of increased suction efficiency, favoring a larger surface area of the foot. This also selects for a decreased body size, enabling the salamander to cling trees more easily.

=== Tail autotomy ===
Tail autotomy refers to the salamanders' ability to release or lose their tail if necessary. This is a common characteristic of nearly all salamanders and lizards. (See autotomy). It is particularly helpful to the salamander in escaping attacks from its predators. Once the tail has been lost, it can regenerate one time. After this regeneration, the tail is incapable of separation with regeneration.

=== Poison ===
Bolitoglossa rostrata and B. subpalmata are two rare examples of poisonous salamanders within their genus. The poison is secreted through their skin as an antipredator mechanism. It is particularly toxic to certain snake species, rendering them immobile and unresponsive to external stimuli upon initial contact. The common defense tactic of these two species is to remain still in the presence of the snake until it makes initial contact (usually by the flickering of its tongue), and then run away as the paralytic poison begins to take effect in the snake.

== Evolution ==
=== Natural selection ===
Tropical adaptation of the Bolitoglossa is thought to have evolved from North American plethodontids. Natural selection is responsible for morphological changes shifting from those supporting temperate environments to those supporting tropical environments such as Panama and Costa Rica. Natural selection is thought to have resulted in genetic changes from physical adaptation. The main differences that have developed from natural selection affect the skull and bones of the feet in these salamanders. Due to these primary changes, secondary changes are believed to have followed, including:

- Body size
- Additional ossification of bones
- Webbing
- Ear structure

Phylogeny of this genus is partially dependent on its variations in bone structure due to the effects of natural selection over a long period of time.

=== Hybridization ===
The first documented case of hybridization in tropical salamanders occurred between B. frankini and B. resplendens. This hybridization has taken a pervasive effect on the morphology of B. resplendens, whereas B. frankini seemed to maintain its same physical structure.

== Taxonomy ==
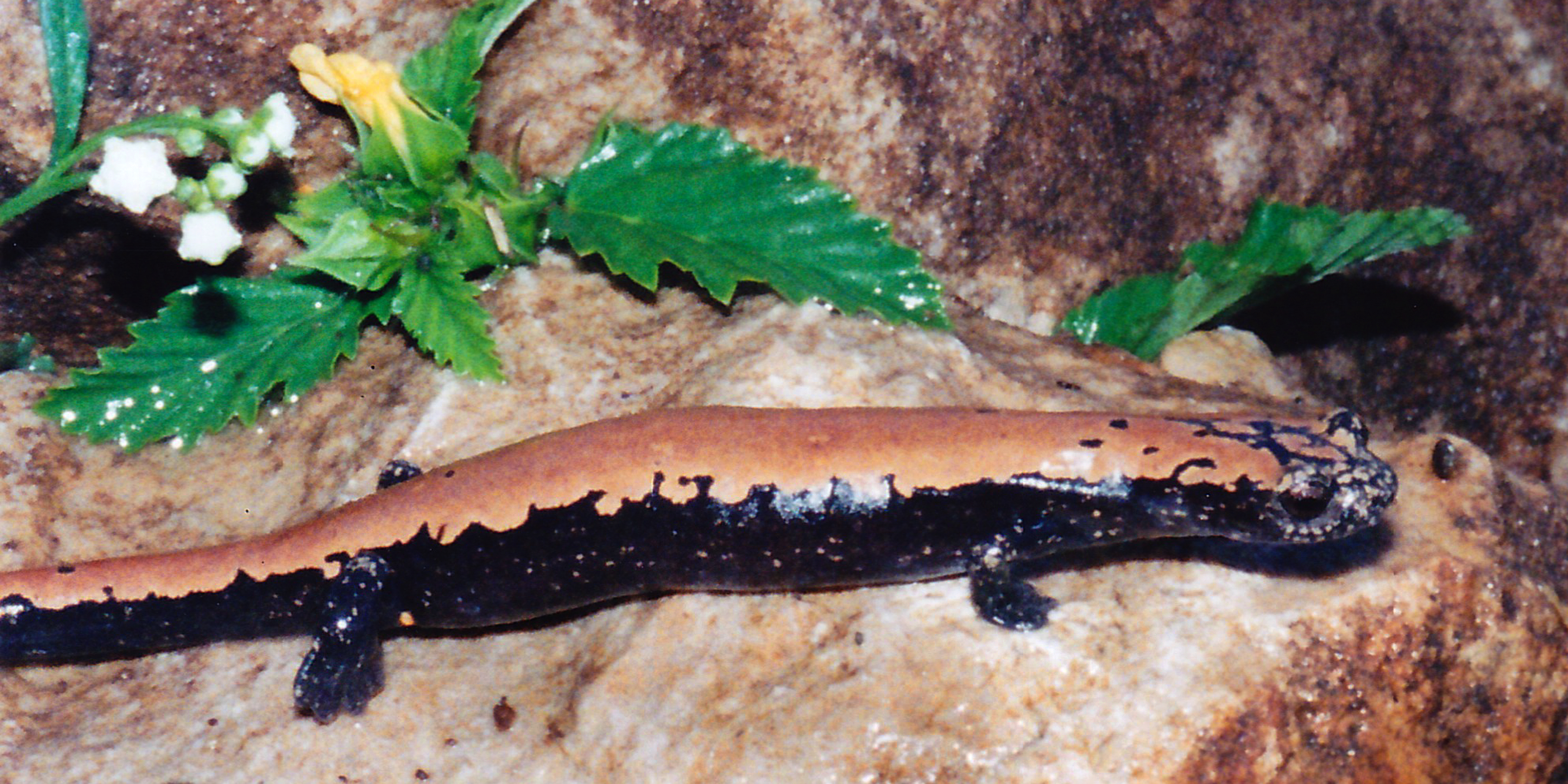
Broadfoot Mushroomtongue Salamander (Bolitoglossa platydactyla), Municipality of Ocampo, Tamaulipas, Mexico (11 July 2005).

Derived characteristics of the genus Bolitoglossa has led to their classification based on this specific list of characters:

- Tongue and hypobranchial apparatus
- Epibranchial Number
  - embryos having a single epibranchial
- Tail Autotomy
- Brain stem motor control
- Bone structure of Jaws, Cranial, and inner ear
- Chromosome number
  - diploid number of chromosomes is 26
- Development

Classification of this genus is primarily accomplished through analysis of the salamanders' DNA. This has proven to be the most effective and accurate way of classifying this genus.

== Species ==
As of January 2024, there are 140 recognised species assigned to this genus.

Binomial Name and author	Common name
B. "altamazonica" Cusi, Gagliardi-Urrutia, Brcko, Wake, and von May, 2020
B. adspersa Peters, 1863	Peter's climbing salamander
B. alberchi García-París, Parra-Olea, Brame & Wake, 2002	Alberch's salamander
B. altamazonica Cope, 1874	Nauta salamander
B. alvaradoi Taylor, 1954	Alvarado's salamander
B. anthracina Brame, Savage, Wake & Hanken, 2001	Coal-black salamander
B. aurae Kubicki B, Arias E. 2016	Aura's golden salamander
B. aureogularis Boza-Oviedo E, Rovito SM, Chaves G, Garcia-Rodriguez A, Artavia LG, Bolanos F, Wake DB 2012	Yellow-throated web-footed salamander
B. awajun Cusi JC, Gagliardi-Urrutia G, Brcko IC, Wake DB, Von May R. 2020	Awajun Salamander
B. biseriata Tanner, 1962	Two-lined climbing salamander
B. bolanosi Arias, Chaves, and Parra-Olea, 2024	Bolaños’ Web-footed Salamander
B. borburata Trapido, 1942	Carabobo climbing salamander
B. bramei Wake, Savage & Hanken, 2007	Brame's climbing salamander
B. caldwellae Brcko IC, Hoogmoed MS, Neckel-Oliveira S 2013	Caldwell's mushroomtongue salamander
B. capitana Brame & Wake, 1963	Orphan salamander
B. carri McCranie & Wilson, 1993	Cloud forest salamander
B. cathyledecae Ponce M, Navarro D, Morales R, and Batista A., 2022	Chiriquí fire salamander
B. cataguana Townsend, Butler, Wilson & Austin, 2009	Cataguana salamander
B. celaque McCranie & Wilson, 1993	Celaque climbing salamander
B. centenorum Campbell et al., 2010
B. cerroensis Taylor, 1952	Millville climbing salamander
B. chica Brame & Wake, 1963	Hotel Zaracay salamander
B. chinanteca Rovito, Parra-Olea, Lee & Wake, 2012	Chinanteca salamander
B. chucantiensis Batista A, Koehler G, Mebert K, Vesely M 2014	Chucanti salamander
B. coaxtlahuacana Palacios-Aguilar R, Cisneros-Bernal AY, Arias-Montiel JD, Parra-Olea G. 2020	Coaxtlahuacán Salamander
B. colonnea Dunn, 1924	La Loma salamander
B. compacta Wake, Brame & Duellman, 1973	Cerro Pando salamander
B. conanti McCranie & Wilson, 1993	Conant's salamander
B. copia Wake, Hanken & Ibáñez, 2005	El Cope giant salamander
B. copinhorum Itgen MW, Sessions SK, Wilson LD, Townsend JH 2020	Lenca mushroomtongue salamander
B. cuchumatana Stuart, 1943	Oak forest salamander
B. cuna Wake, Brame, & Duellman, 1973	Camp Sasardi salamander
B. daryorum Campbell et al., 2010
B. decora McCranie & Wilson, 1997	Monte Escondido salamander
B. diaphora McCranie & Wilson, 1995	El Cusuco salamander
B. digitigrada Wake, Brame & Thomas, 1982	Rio Santa Rosa salamander
B. diminuta Robinson, 1976	Quebrada Valverde salamander
B. dofleini Werner, 1903	Doflein's salamander
B. dunni Schmidt, 1933	Dunn's climbing salamander
B. engelhardti Schmidt, 1936	Engelhardt's climbing salamander
B. epimela Wake & Brame, 1963	Tapanti climbing salamander
B. equatoriana Brame & Wake, 1972	Ecuadorian climbing salamander
B. eremia Campbell et al., 2010
B. flavimembris Schmidt, 1936	Yellow-legged climbing salamander
B. flaviventris Schmidt, 1936	Yellow-belly climbing salamander
B. franklini Schmidt, 1936	Franklin's climbing salamander
B. gomezi Wake, Savage & Hanken, 2007	Gómez's web-footed salamander
B. gracilis Bolaños, Robinson & Wake, 1987	Rio Quiri salamander
B. guaneae Acosta-Galvis AR, Gutierrez-Lamus DL 2012
B. guaramacalensis Schargel, García-Pérez & Smith, 2002	Guaramacal salamander
B. hartwegi Wake & Brame, 1969	Hartweg's climbing Salamander
B. heiroreias Greenbaum, 2004	Holy-Mountain salamander
B. helmrichi Schmidt, 1836	Coban climbing salamander
B. hermosa Papenfuss, Wake & Adler, 1984	Guerreran climbing salamander
B. hiemalis Lynch, 2001	Winter climbing salamander
B. huehuetenanguensis Campbell et al., 2010
B. hypacra Brame & Wake, 1962	Paramo Frontino salamander
B. indio Wake, et al., 2008	Rio Indio Webfoot Salamander
B. insularis Wake, et al., 2008
B. jacksoni Elias, 1984	Jackson's climbing salamander
B. jugivagans Hertz A, Lotzkat S, Koehler G 2013	Continental divide salamander
B. kamuk Boza-Oviedo, Rovito, Chaves, García-Rodríguez, Artavia, Bolaños, and Wake, 2012	Kamuk Web-footed Salamander
B. kaqchikelorum Campbell et al., 2010
B. la Campbell et al., 2010
B. leandrae Acevedo AA, Wake DB, Marquez R, Silva K, Franco R, Amezquita A 2013	Leandra salamander
B. lignicolor Peters, 1873	Camron climbing salamander
B. lincolni Stuart, 1943	Lincoln's climbing salamander
B. longissima McCranie & Cruz, 1996	Longest climbing salamander
B. lozanoi Acosta-Galvis & Restrepo, 2001	Lozano's salamander
B. macrinii Lafrentz, 1930	Oaxacan climbing salamander

Binomial Name and Author	Common name
B. madeira Brcko IC, Hoogmoed MS, Neckel-Oliveira S 2013
B. magnifica Hanken, Wake & Savage, 2005	Magnificent web-footed salamander
B. marmorea Tanner & Brame, 1961	Crater salamander
B. medemi Brame & Wake, 1972	Finca Chibigui salamander
B. meliana Wake & Lynch, 1982	Meliana climbing salamander
B. mexicana Duméril, Bibron & Duméril, 1854	Mexican climbing salamander
B. minutula Wake, Brame & Duellman, 1973	Dwarf climbing salamander
B. mombachoensis Köhler & McCranie, 1999	Mombacho salamander
B. morio Cope, 1869	Cope's climbing salamander
B. mucuyensis Garcia-Gutierrez J, Escalona M, Mora A, Diaz de Pascual A, Fermin G. 2013	La Mucuy salamander
B. muisca López-Perilla, Fernández-Roldán, Meza-Joya, and Medina-Rangel, 2023	Muisca salamander
B. mulleri Brocchi, 1883	Muller's climbing salamander
B. nicefori Brame & Wake, 1963	San Gil climbing salamander
B. nigrescens Taylor, 1949	Cordillera central salamander
B. ninadormida Campbell et al., 2010
B. nussbaumi Campbell et al., 2010
B. nympha Campbell et al., 2010
B. oaxacensis Parra-Olea, Garcia-Paris & Wake, 2002	Atoyac web-footed salamander
B. obscura Hanken, Wake & Savage, 2005	Tapantí giant salamander
B. occidentalis Taylor, 1941	Southern banana salamander
B. odonnelli Stuart, 1943	O'Donnell's climbing salamander
B. omniumsanctorum Stuart, 1952	Todos Santos Salamander
B. oresbia McCranie, Espinal & Wilson, 2005	Zarciadero web-footed salamander
B. orestes Brame & Wake, 1962	Culata climbing salamander
B. pacaya Campbell et al., 2010
B. palmata Werner, 1897	Amazon climbing salamander
B. pandi Brame & Wake, 1963	Pandi climbing salamander
B. paraensis Unterstein, 1930	Para climbing salamander
B. peruviana Boulenger, 1883	Peruvian climbing salamander
B. pesrubra Taylor, 1952	Red-footed climbing salamander
B. phalarosoma Wake & Brame, 1962	Medellin climbing salamander
B. platydactyla Gray in Cuvier, 1831	Broadfoot climbing salamander
B. porrasorum McCranie & Wilson, 1995	Pijol salamander
B. psephena Campbell et al., 2010
B. pygmaea Bolaños & Wake, 2009	Pygmy web-footed salamander
B. qeqom Hellen D-B, Serrano MJ, Alonso-Ascencio M, Cruz-Font JJ, Rosito-Prado I, Ruiz-Villanueva KJA, Vásquez-Almazán JR, Ariano-Sánchez D. 2021
B. ramosi Brame & Wake, 1972	Ramos' climbing salamander
B. riletti Holman, 1964	Rilett's climbing salamander
B. robinsoni Bolaños & Wake, 2009	Robinson's web-footed salamander
B. robusta Cope, 1894	Robust climbing salamander
B. rostrata Brocchi, 1883	Long-nosed climbing salamander
B. rufescens Cope, 1869	Northern banana Salamander
B. salvinii Gray, 1868	Salvin's salamander
B. savagei Brame & Wake, 1963	Savage's salamander
B. schizodactyla Wake & Brame, 1966	Cocle salamander
B. silverstonei Brame & Wake, 1972	Silverstone's salamander
B. sima Vaillant, 1911	Northwestern climbing salamander
B. sombra Hanken, Wake & Savage, 2005	Shadowy web-footed salamander
B. sooyorum Vial, 1963	Cordillera Talamanca salamander
B. spendida Boza-Oviedo, Rovito, Chaves, García-Rodríguez, Artavia, Bolaños, and Wake, 2012	Splendid Web-footed Salamander
B. striatula Noble, 1918	Cukra climbing salamander
B. stuarti Wake & Brame, 1969	Stuart's salamander
B. subpalmata Boulenger, 1896	La Palma salamander
B. suchitanensis Campbell et al., 2010
B. synoria McCranie & Köhler, 1999	Cerro Pital salamander
B. tamaense Acevedo AA, Wake DB, Marquez R, Silva K, Franco R, Amezquita A 2013	Tama salamander
B. tapajonica Brcko IC, Hoogmoed MS, Neckel-Oliveira S 2013
B. tatamae Acosta-Galvis & Hoyos, 2006	Tatama climbing salamander
B. taylori Wake, Brame & Myers, 1970	Taylor's salamander
B. tenebrosa Vasquez-Almazan CR, Rovito SM 2014	Guatemalan black salamander
B. tica García-París, Parra-Olea & Wake, 2008	Tico salamander
B. tzultacaj Campbell et al., 2010
B. vallecula Brame & Wake, 1963	Yarumal climbing salamander
B. veracrucis Taylor, 1951	Veracruz salamander
B. walkeri Brame & Wake, 1972	Walker's salamander
B. xibalba Campbell et al., 2010
B. yariguiensis Meza-Joya FL, Hernandez-Jaimes C, Ramos-Pallares E. 2017	Yariguíes salamander
B. yucatana Peters, 1882	Yucatán salamander
B. zacapensis Rovito, Vásquez-Almazán & Papenfuss, 2010	Zacapa salamander
B. zapoteca Parra-Olea, Garcia-Paris & Wake, 2002	Zapotec salamander
