= Bolitoglossa nympha =

Scientific classification
- Kingdom: Animalia
- Phylum: Chordata
- Class: Amphibia
- Order: Urodela
- Family: Plethodontidae
- Genus: Bolitoglossa
- Species: B. nympha

Binomial name
- Bolitoglossa nympha Campbell et al., 2010

Species of amphibian

Bolitoglossa nympha is a lungless salamander in the family Plethodontidae endemic to Guatemala.

== Physical Description ==
Both males and females have a similar average length of 39 mm, and an average tail length of 31 mm. Its limbs are short, its hands and feet are webbed. The dorsal side of the species ranges from tan to reddish brown. The ventral side can either be cream in colour with darker melanophores scattered along its surface or almost completely dark, although not as dark as the flanks.

== Threats ==
The main threat to this species in Guatemala is habitat loss due to deforestation from logging and timber enterprises, mining, and agricultural expansion. In Honduras, palm oil and cacao plantations and their associated herbicides and pesticides are a major threat to this species. However, they are also affected by logging, urban development, livestock grazing, and man-made fires. Climate change, specifically in increased rainfall and droughts is considered a threat in various other parts of this species range. Lastly, a potential threat that could affect species of this genus in Honduras is infection from Chytrid fungi.
