= Cerro Miramundo =

National park in Zacapa, Guatemala

Cerro Miramundo National Park
- Interactive map of Cerro Miramundo; National Park
- Location: Zacapa (department), Guatemala
- Coordinates: 14°56′13″N 89°32′57″W
- Area: 9.02 km^{2} (3.48 sq mi)
- Elevation: 650 m (2,130 ft)
- Established: Acuerdo Gubernativo 21-06-56
- Operator: CONAP

Cerro Miramundo, also known as Montaña de la Soledad, is a hill covered with dry shrubland located a few kilometers south of the city of Zacapa in Guatemala. The hill represents a panoramic point with an impressive view over the surrounding landscape.

An area of 9.02 km^{2} was declared a national park in 1956.
