= Rhinella amboroensis =

Conservation status
- Data Deficient (IUCN 3.1)

Scientific classification
- Kingdom: Animalia
- Phylum: Chordata
- Class: Amphibia
- Order: Anura
- Family: Bufonidae
- Genus: Rhinella
- Species: R. amboroensis

Binomial name
- Rhinella amboroensis (Harvey and Smith, 1993)

Synonyms
- Bufo amboroensis Harvey and Smith, 1993; Chaunus amboroensis (Harvey and Smith, 1993)

Species of amphibian

Rhinella amboroensis is a species of toad in the family Bufonidae that is endemic to the region of its type locality in the Carrasco Province (Cochabamba Department) of Bolivia and the adjacent Santa Cruz Department. Its common name is Cochabamba toad. It may exist in the Carrasco National Park and/or Amboró National Park, depending on its exact range.

Its natural habitats are cloud forests where it occurs in both aquatic and terrestrial habitats. It is threatened by habitat loss.
