= Cope's climbing salamander =

Conservation status
- Vulnerable (IUCN 3.1)

Scientific classification
- Kingdom: Animalia
- Phylum: Chordata
- Class: Amphibia
- Order: Urodela
- Family: Plethodontidae
- Genus: Bolitoglossa
- Species: B. morio

Binomial name
- Bolitoglossa morio (Cope, 1869)

Synonyms
- Spelerpes Bocourti Brocchi, 1883

Species of amphibian

Cope's climbing salamander (Bolitoglossa morio) is a species of salamander in the family Plethodontidae. It is endemic to Guatemala. Its natural habitats are subtropical or tropical moist montane forests and heavily degraded former forest. It is threatened by habitat loss.
