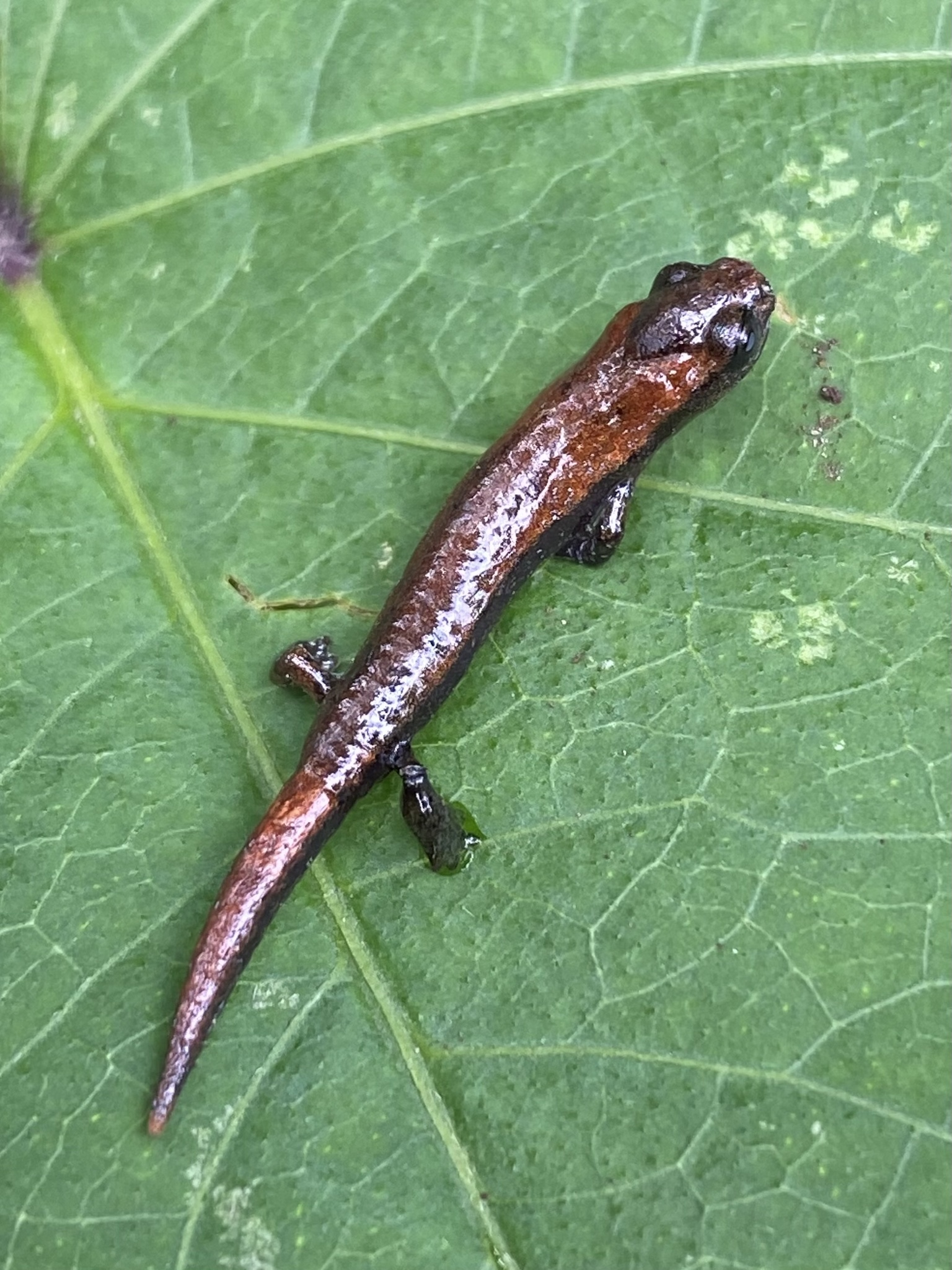

Conservation status
- Critically Endangered (IUCN 3.1)

Scientific classification
- Kingdom: Animalia
- Phylum: Chordata
- Class: Amphibia
- Order: Urodela
- Family: Plethodontidae
- Genus: Bolitoglossa
- Species: B. centenorum

Binomial name
- Bolitoglossa centenorum Campbell et al., 2010

= Bolitoglossa centenorum =

Species of amphibian

Bolitoglossa centenorum is a lungless salamander in the family Plethodontidae endemic to Guatemala.

== Description ==
This little salamander is about 6 cm (2.4 in) in snout–vent length.

== Distribution and habitat ==
Bolitglossa centenorum is known only from the type locality near San Mateo Ixtatán in the Sierra de los Cuchumatanes. Individuals of the type series were collected from under rotting logs.
