= Robust climbing salamander =

Conservation status
- Vulnerable (IUCN 3.1)

Scientific classification
- Kingdom: Animalia
- Phylum: Chordata
- Class: Amphibia
- Order: Urodela
- Family: Plethodontidae
- Genus: Bolitoglossa
- Species: B. robusta

Binomial name
- Bolitoglossa robusta (Cope, 1894)

Species of amphibian

The robust climbing salamander (Bolitoglossa robusta) is a species of salamander in the family Plethodontidae. It is found in Costa Rica and Panama. Its natural habitats are subtropical or tropical moist lowland forests and subtropical or tropical moist montane forests. It is threatened by habitat loss.
