= Cordillera Central salamander =

Conservation status
- Data Deficient (IUCN 3.1)

Scientific classification
- Kingdom: Animalia
- Phylum: Chordata
- Class: Amphibia
- Order: Urodela
- Family: Plethodontidae
- Genus: Bolitoglossa
- Species: B. nigrescens

Binomial name
- Bolitoglossa nigrescens (Taylor, 1949)

Species of amphibian

The Cordillera Central salamander (Bolitoglossa nigrescens) is a species of salamander in the family Plethodontidae.

It is endemic to Costa Rica. Its natural habitat is subtropical or tropical moist montane forests. It is threatened by habitat loss.
