= Bolitoglossa nussbaumi =

Conservation status
- Critically endangered, possibly extinct (IUCN 3.1)

Scientific classification
- Kingdom: Animalia
- Phylum: Chordata
- Class: Amphibia
- Order: Urodela
- Family: Plethodontidae
- Genus: Bolitoglossa
- Species: B. nussbaumi

Binomial name
- Bolitoglossa nussbaumi Campbell et al., 2010

Species of amphibian

Bolitoglossa nussbaumi, known as the Nussbaum's mushroom-tongued salamander is a lungless salamander in the family Plethodontidae. It is endemic to Guatemala.

== Taxonomy ==
Bolitoglossa nussbaumi was described in 2010. Its specific epithet honors herpetologist Ronald A. Nussbaum.

== Description ==
The Nussbaum's mushroom-tongued salamander averages around 50mm in length. Its dark brown in coloration, and some individuals have darker brown stripes. Its toes are more distinct and less webbed than other members of its genus, distinguishing it from them.

== Habitat and Distribution ==
The species is only known from its type locality, the Sierra de los Cuchumatanes in Guatemala. It's believed that its distribution is limited to that area, as surveys in nearby suitable locations have never found Bolitogloss nussbaumi present. Specimens have been collected with within and under rotting wood in dry, forested areas.

== History Conservation ==
The type species of Bolitoglossa nussbaumi was collected in 1998 and despite surveys taking place since then, the species has not been seen since. It was assessed as Critically Endangered and possibly extinct by the IUCN in 2020. The main threats facing it are believed to include disease, habitat loss, and climate change.
