= Bolitoglossa daryorum =

Conservation status
- Endangered (IUCN 3.1)

Scientific classification
- Kingdom: Animalia
- Phylum: Chordata
- Class: Amphibia
- Order: Urodela
- Family: Plethodontidae
- Genus: Bolitoglossa
- Species: B. daryorum

Binomial name
- Bolitoglossa daryorum Campbell et al., 2010

Species of amphibian

Bolitoglossa daryorum is a lungless salamander in the family Plethodontidae endemic to Guatemala.
