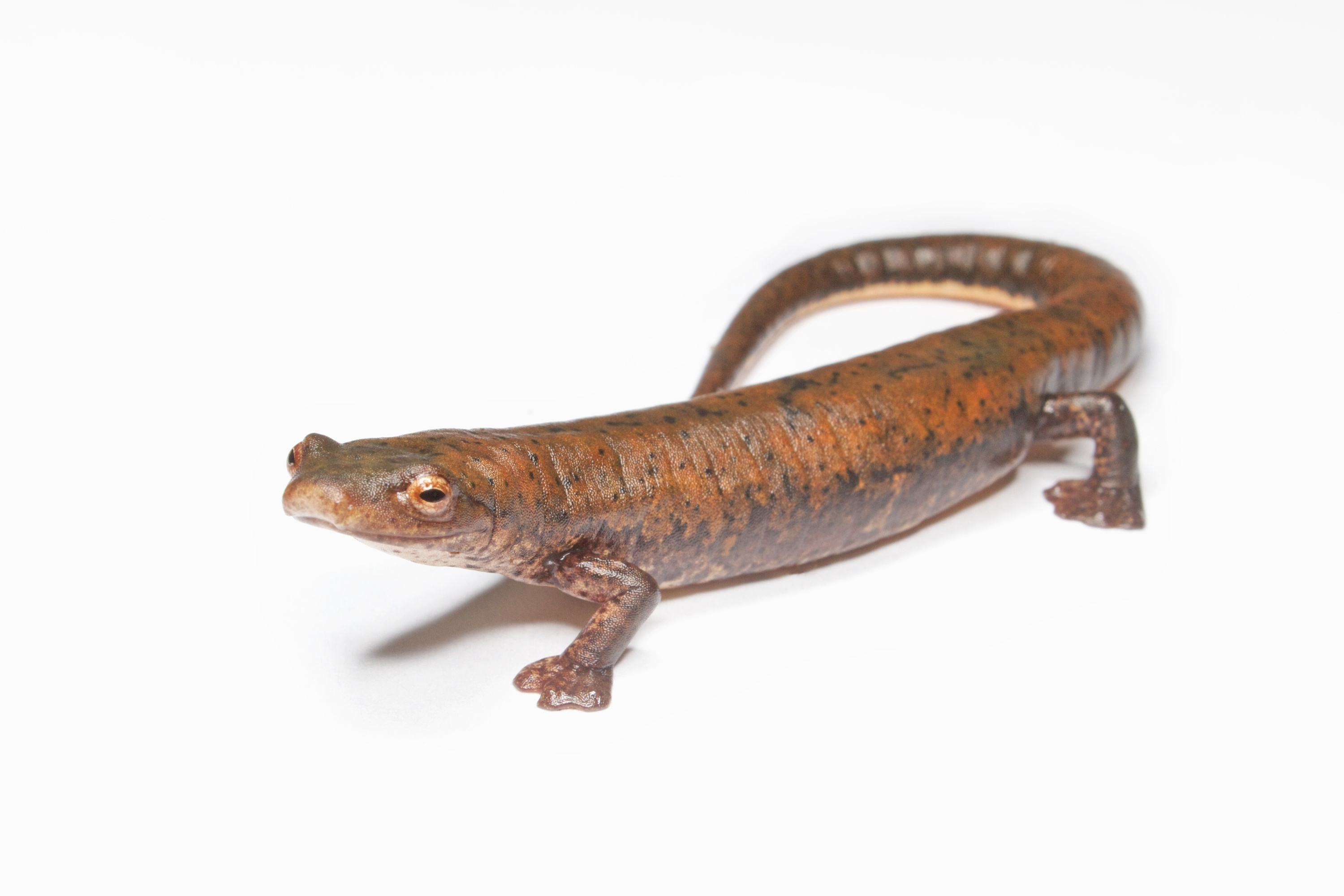

Conservation status
- Least Concern (IUCN 3.1)

Scientific classification
- Kingdom: Animalia
- Phylum: Chordata
- Class: Amphibia
- Order: Urodela
- Family: Plethodontidae
- Genus: Bolitoglossa
- Species: B. schizodactyla

Binomial name
- Bolitoglossa schizodactyla Wake and Brame, 1966

= Cocle salamander =

Species of amphibian

The Cocle salamander (Bolitoglossa schizodactyla), also known as the Cocle mushroomtongue salamander, is a species of salamander in the family Plethodontidae. It is found in Costa Rica and Panama. In Costa Rica, it is only known from the southeastern part of the country on the Atlantic versant, whereas in Panama it is more widespread and occurs also on the Pacific versant. Its natural habitats are humid lowland and montane forests. It is a common species in Panama, whereas it is only known from a single specimen in Costa Rica. It is threatened by habitat loss.
