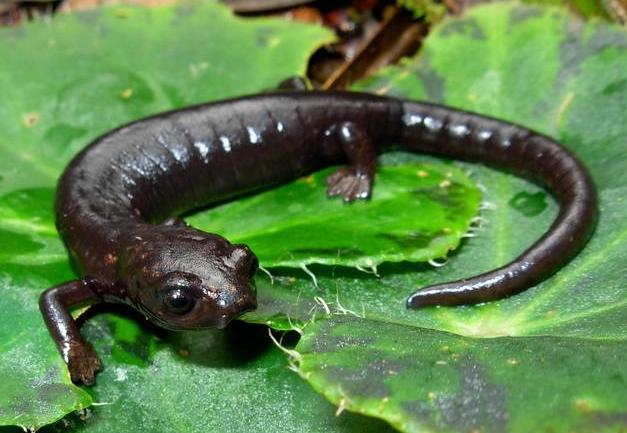

Conservation status
- Near Threatened (IUCN 3.1)

Scientific classification
- Kingdom: Animalia
- Phylum: Chordata
- Class: Amphibia
- Order: Urodela
- Family: Plethodontidae
- Genus: Bolitoglossa
- Species: B. adspersa

Binomial name
- Bolitoglossa adspersa (Peters, 1863)

= Peter's climbing salamander =

Species of amphibian

Peter's climbing salamander or Peter's mushroomtongue salamander (Bolitoglossa adspersa) is a species of salamander in the family Plethodontidae. It is endemic to Colombia. Its natural habitats are subtropical or tropical moist montane forests and subtropical or tropical high-altitude grassland. It is threatened by habitat loss.
