= List of amphibians of Guatemala =

This is a list of amphibians found in Guatemala. There are 158 amphibian species recorded in Guatemala, which are grouped in three orders: caecilians (Gymnophiona), salamanders (Caudata) and frogs and toads (Anura). The IUCN considers that 33 of these species are critically endangered, 27 endangered, 11 near threatened and 21 vulnerable. This list is largely derived from the database listing of AmphibiaWeb and Campbell's checklist.

Table of contents

Caecilians: Caeciliidae

Salamanders: Plethodontidae

Frogs and toads: Rhinophrynidae • Craugastoridae • Leptodactylidae • Eleutherodactylidae • Bufonidae • Hylidae • Centrolenidae • Microhylidae • Ranidae •

Notes References

== Caecilians (Gymnophiona) ==
=== Caeciliidae ===
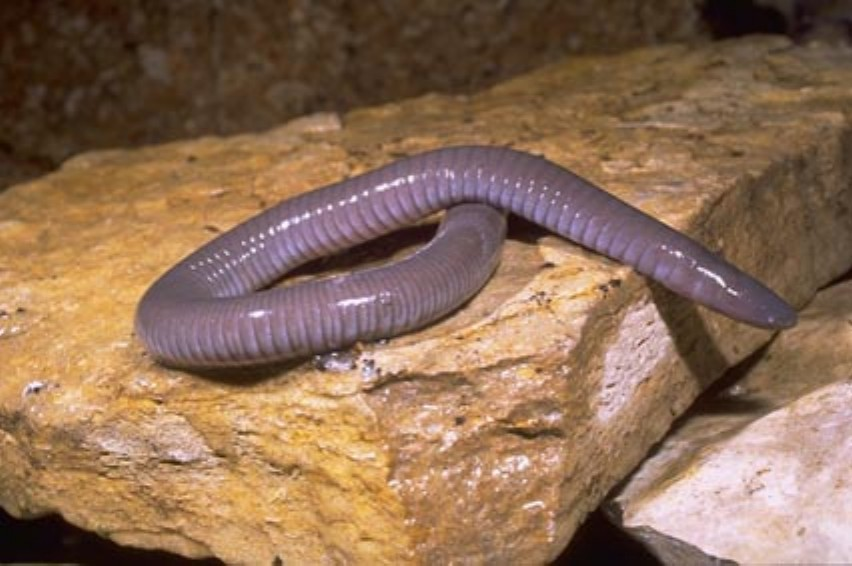
Dermophis mexicanus

Caeciliidae, or common caecilians, is a family of caecilians that are native to South and Central America, equatorial Africa and India. Like other caecilians, they superficially resemble worms or snakes. Although they are the most diverse of the caecilian families, the caeciliids do have a number of features in common that distinguish them from other caecilians. In particular, their skulls have relatively few bones, with those that are present being fused to form a solid ram to aid in burrowing through the soil. The mouth is recessed beneath the snout, and there is no tail. There are more than 100 caeciliids worldwide, 2 of which occur in Guatemala.

Order: Gymnophiona. Family: Caeciliidae

- Dermophis mexicanus (Duméril & Bibron, 1841)
- Gymnopis syntrema (Cope, 1866)

== Salamanders (Caudata) ==
=== Plethodontidae ===
Order: Caudata. Family: Plethodontidae

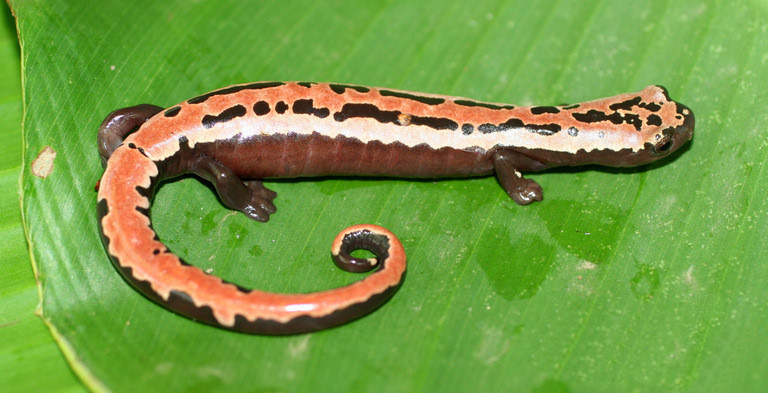
Bolitoglossa mexicana

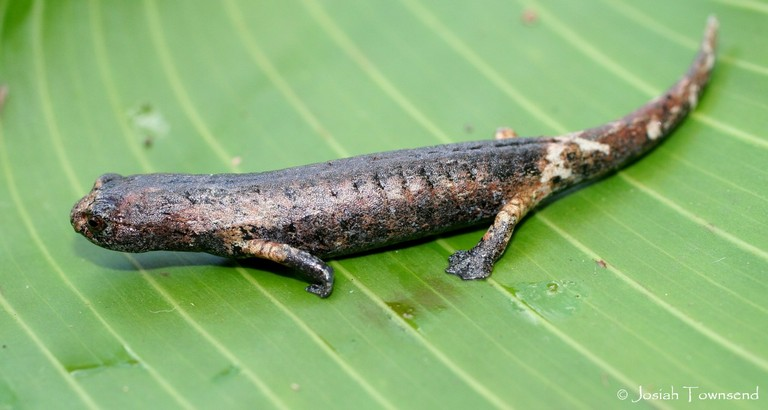
Bolitoglossa dofleini

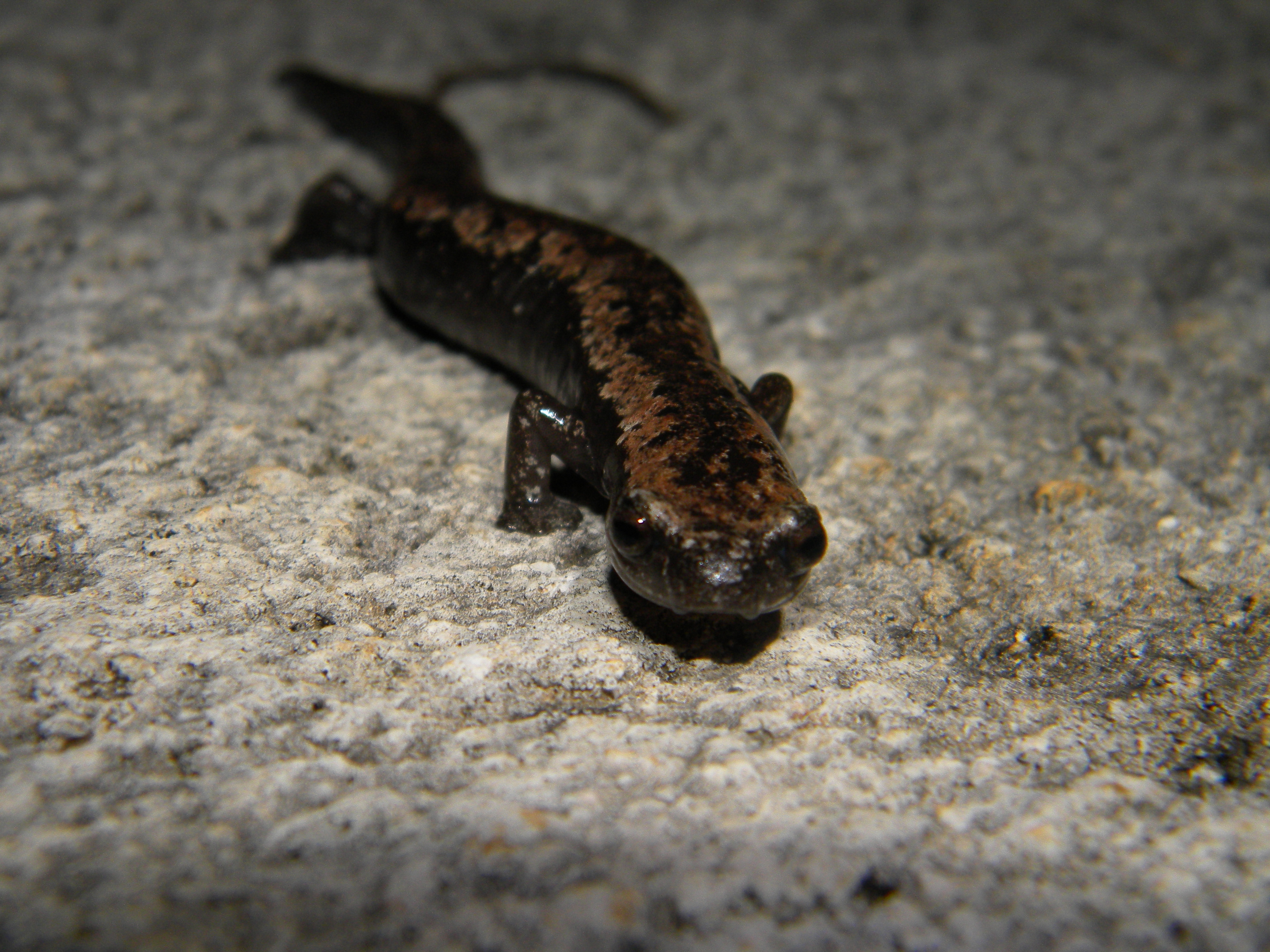
Bolitoglossa yucatana

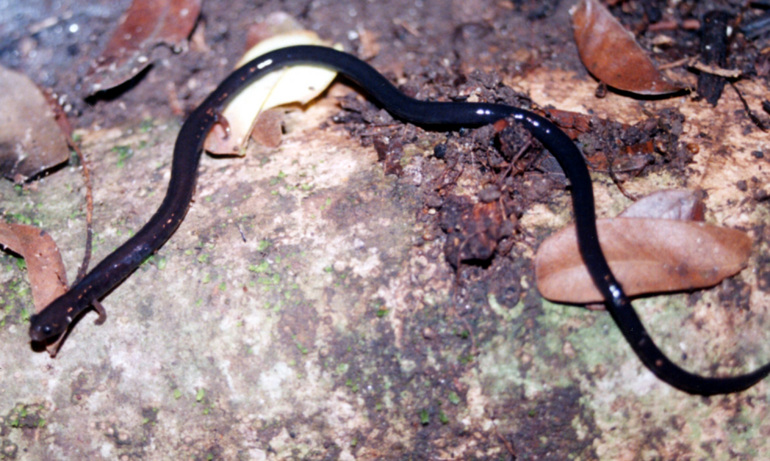
Oedipina taylori

The Plethodontidae, or lungless salamanders, are a family of salamanders. Most species are native to the Western Hemisphere, from British Columbia to Brazil, although a few species are found in Sardinia, Europe south of the Alps, and South Korea. A number of features distinguish the Plethodontids from other salamanders. Most significantly, they lack lungs, conducting respiration through their skin, and the tissues lining their mouths. Another distinctive feature is the presence of a vertical slit between the nostril and upper lip, known as the "naso-labial groove". The groove is lined with glands, and enhances the salamander's chemoreception. Due to their modest size and low metabolism, they are able to feed on prey such as collembola, which are usually too small for other terrestrial vertebrates. This gives them access to a whole ecological niche with minimal competition from other groups. They are by far the largest group of salamanders. There are about 380 species worldwide, of which 41 occur in Guatemala.

- Oak forest salamander – Bolitoglossa cuchumatana (Stuart, 1943) [E]
- Doflein's salamander – Bolitoglossa dofleini (Werner, 1903)
- Dunn's climbing salamander – Bolitoglossa dunni (Schmidt, 1933) [EN]
- Engelhardt's climbing salamander – Bolitoglossa engelhardti (Schmidt, 1936) [EN]
- Yellow-legged climbing salamander – Bolitoglossa flavimembris (Schmidt, 1936) [EN]
- Yellow-belly climbing salamander – Bolitoglossa flaviventris (Schmidt, 1936)
- Franklin's climbing salamander – Bolitoglossa franklini (Schmidt, 1936) [EN]
- Hartweg's climbing salamander – Bolitoglossa hartwegi Wake & Brame, 1969
- Coban climbing salamander – Bolitoglossa helmrichi (Schmidt, 1936) [E]
- Jackson's climbing salamander – Bolitoglossa jacksoni Elias, 1984 [E]
- Lincoln's climbing salamander – Bolitoglossa lincolni (Stuart, 1943)
- Meliana climbing salamander – Bolitoglossa meliana Wake & Lynch, 1982 [E, EN]
- Mexican climbing salamander – Bolitoglossa mexicana Duméril, Bibron & Duméril, 1854
- Cope's climbing salamander – Bolitoglossa morio (Cope, 1869) [E]
- Muller's climbing salamander – Bolitoglossa mulleri (Brocchi, 1883) [VU]
- Southern banana salamander – Bolitoglossa occidentalis Taylor, 1941
- O'Donnell's climbing salamander – Bolitoglossa odonnelli (Stuart, 1943) [EN]
- Bolitoglossa qeqom (Dahinten et al. 2021)
- Bolitoglossa resplendens McCoy & Walker, 1966
- Long-nosed climbing salamander – Bolitoglossa rostrata (Brocchi, 1883) [VU]
- Northern banana salamander – Bolitoglossa rufescens (Cope, 1869)
- Salvin's salamander – Bolitoglossa salvinii (Gray, 1868) [EN]
- Stuart's salamander – Bolitoglossa stuarti Wake & Brame, 1969 [EN]
- Yucatan salamander – Bolitoglossa yucatana (Peters, 1882)
- Finca Chiblac salamander – Bradytriton silus Wake & Elias, 1983 [E, CR]
- Monzon's hidden salamander – Cryptotriton monzoni (Campbell & Smith, 1998) [E, CR]
- Baja Verapaz salamander – Cryptotriton veraepacis (Lynch & Wake, 1978) [E, EN]
- Wake's hidden salamander – Cryptotriton wakei (Campbell & Smith, 1998)
- Common bromeliad salamander – Dendrotriton bromeliacius (Schmidt, 1936) [EN]
- Cuchumatanes bromeliad salamander – Dendrotriton cuchumatanus (Lynch & Wake, 1975) [E, CR]
- Guatemalan bromeliad salamander – Dendrotriton rabbi (Lynch & Wake, 1975) [EN]
- Cerro Pozo de Agua moss salamander – Nototriton brodiei Campbell & Smith, 1998
- Stuart's moss salamander – Nototriton stuarti Wake & Campbell, 2000 [E]
- Long-limbed salamander – Nyctanolis pernix Elias & Wake, 1983 [EN]
- White-crowned worm salamander – Oedipina elongata (Schmidt, 1936)
- Chimaltenango worm salamander – Oedipina ignea Stuart, 1952
- Narrow-footed worm salamander – Oedipina stenopodia Brodie & Campbell, 1993 [E, EN]
- Taylor's worm salamander – Oedipina taylori Stuart, 1952
- Brown false brook salamander – Pseudoeurycea brunnata Bumzahem & Smith, 1955 [CR]
- Jalpa false brook salamander – Pseudoeurycea exspectata Stuart, 1954 [E, CR]
- Goebel's false brook salamander – Pseudoeurycea goebeli (Schmidt, 1936) [EN]
- Royal false brook salamander – Pseudoeurycea rex (Dunn, 1921)

== Frogs and toads (Anura) ==
=== Rhinophrynidae ===
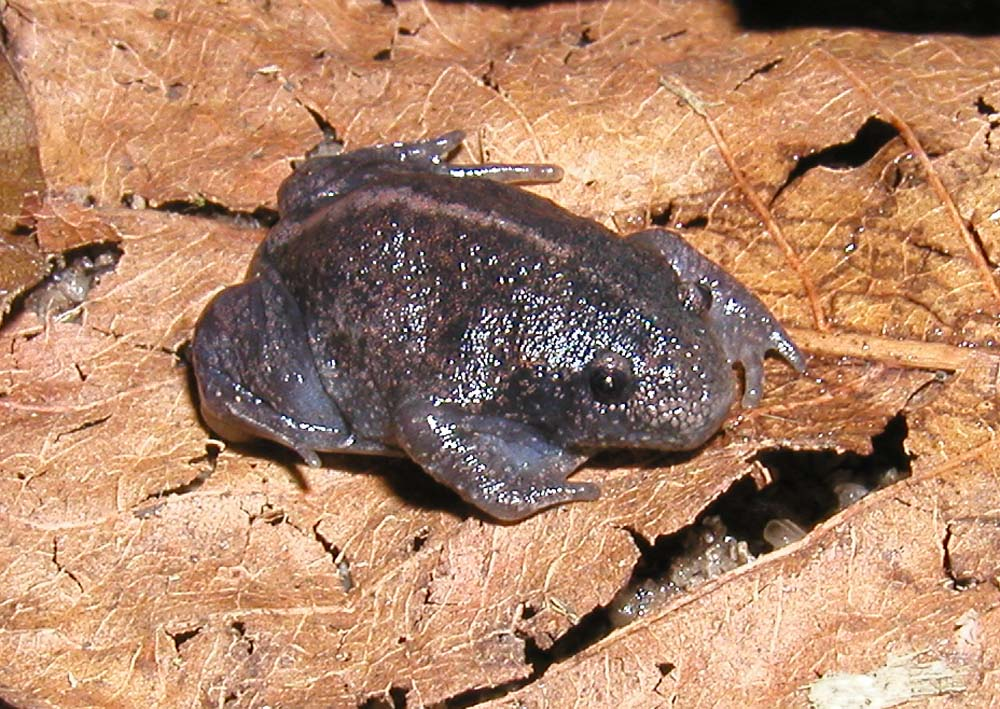
Rhinophrynus dorsalis

Order: Anura. Family: Rhinophrynidae

Rhinophrynida is a monotypical family which contains one single species (Rhinophrynus dorsalis), distributed from southern Texas through Mexico, Guatemala, Honduras, El Salvador to Nicaragua and Costa Rica. Rhinophrynus dorsalis, commonly known as the Mexican burrowing toad, grows to 8 cm (3.1 in) in length, and usually has red spots on its bloated body with a red stripe along the center of its back. It has short legs, and a small, pointed head. Its feet have horny, shovel-like appendages which, along with the short, powerful legs, aid it in digging. Its eyes are relatively small, and the tympanum is not visible.

- Mexican burrowing toad – Rhinophrynus dorsalis Duméril & Bibron, 1841

=== Craugastoridae ===
Order: Anura. Family: Craugastoridae

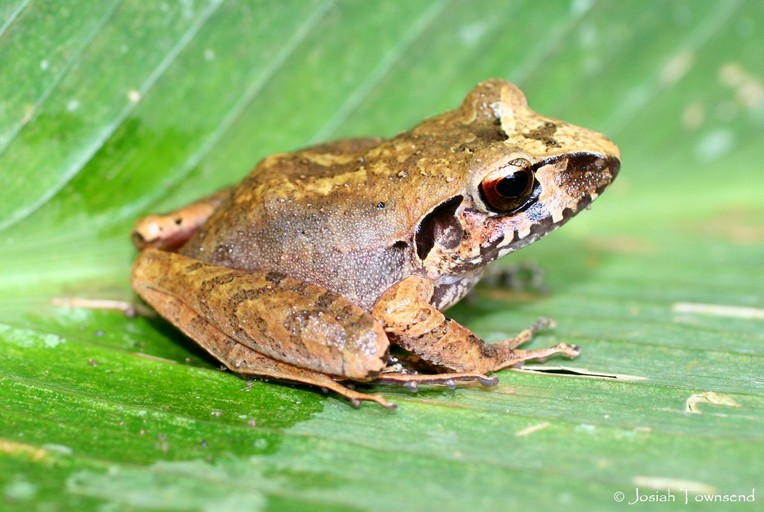
Craugastor laticeps

- Craugastor adamastus Campbell 1994 [E]
- Craugastor alfredi (Boulenger, 1898) [VU]
- Craugastor amniscola Campbell & Savage, 2000
- Craugastor aphanus Campbell 1994 [E, VU]
- Craugastor bocourti (Brocchi, 1877) [E, VU]
- Craugastor brocchi (Boulenger, 1882) [VU]
- Craugastor campbelli (Smith, 2005) [E]
- Craugastor chac Savage, 1987
- Craugastor charadra Campbell & Savage, 2000 [EN]
- Craugastor daryi Ford & Savage, 1884 [E, EN]
- Craugastor greggi Bumzahem, 1955 [CR]
- Craugastor inachus Campbell & Savage, 2000 [E, EN]
- Craugastor laticeps (A. Duméril, 1853)
- Craugastor lineatus (Brocchi, 1879) [CR]
- Craugastor loki (Shannon & Werler, 1955)
- Craugastor matudai Taylor [VU]
- Craugastor myllomyllon (Savage, 2000) (E)
- Craugastor nefrens (Smith, 2005)
- Craugastor palenque Campbell & Savage, 2000
- Craugastor psephosypharus Campbell, Savage & Meyer, 1994 [VU]
- Craugastor pygmaeus Taylor, 1936
- Craugastor rhodopis (Cope, 1867)
- Craugastor rivulus Campbell & Savage, 2000
- Craugastor rostralis (Werner, 1896)
- Craugastor rupinius Campbell & Savage, 2000
- Craugastor sabrinus Campbell & Savage, 2000
- Craugastor sandersoni Schmidt, 1941
- Craugastor stuarti Lynch, 1967
- Craugastor trachydermus Campbell 1994
- Craugastor xucanebi Stuart, 1941

=== Leptodactylidae ===
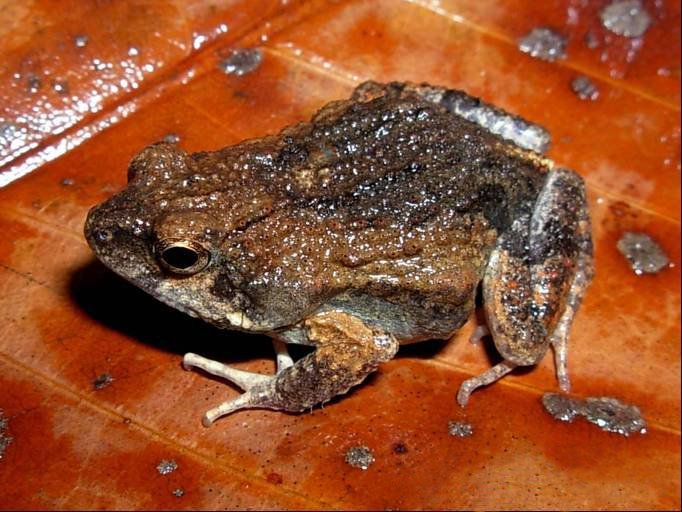
Engystomops pustulosus

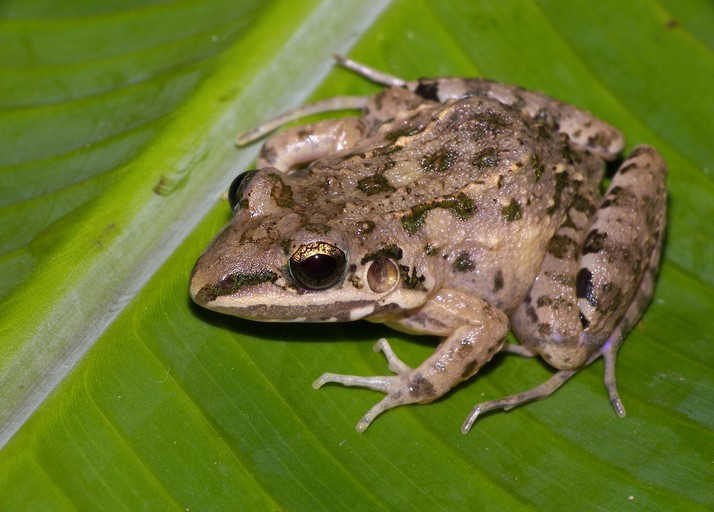
Leptodactylus fragilis

Order: Anura. Family: Leptodactylidae

Leptodactylidae is a large and diverse family of frogs that are widely distributed throughout Mexico, Central America, the Caribbean, and South America. The family includes terrestrial, burrowing, aquatic, and arboreal members, inhabiting a wide range of different habitats. There are roughly 50 genera, with approximately 1100 leptodactylid species, 4 of which occur in Guatemala.

- Tungara frog – Engystomops pustulosus (Cope, 1864)
- Mexican white-lipped frog – Leptodactylus fragilis (Brocchi, 1878)
- Leptodactylus labialis (Cope, 1877)
- Leptodactylus melanonotus (Hallowell, 1860)

=== Eleutherodactylidae ===
Order: Anura. Family: Eleutherodactylidae

Eleutherodactylidae is a large family of frogs that are distributed in the neotropics, from the south of Texas, through Central America to the north of South America. 3 species occur in Guatemala.

- Eleutherodactylus leprus Cope, 1879 [VU]
- Eleutherodactylus pipilans Taylor, 1940
- Eleutherodactylus rubrimaculatus Taylor & Smith, 1945 [VU]

=== Bufonidae ===
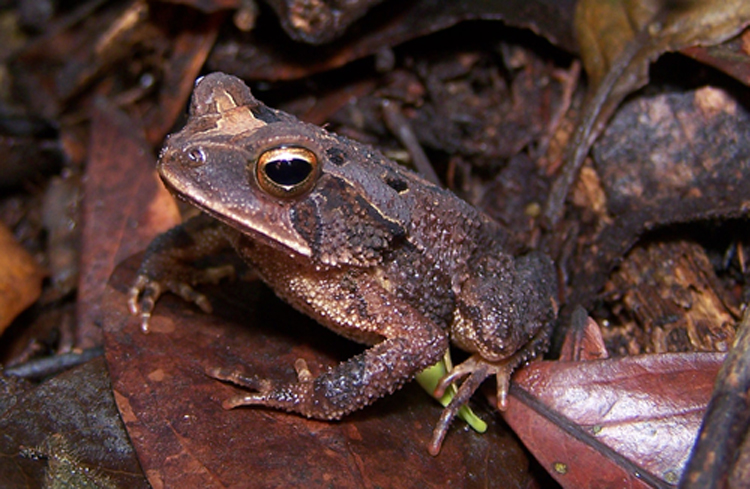
Bufo canaliferus

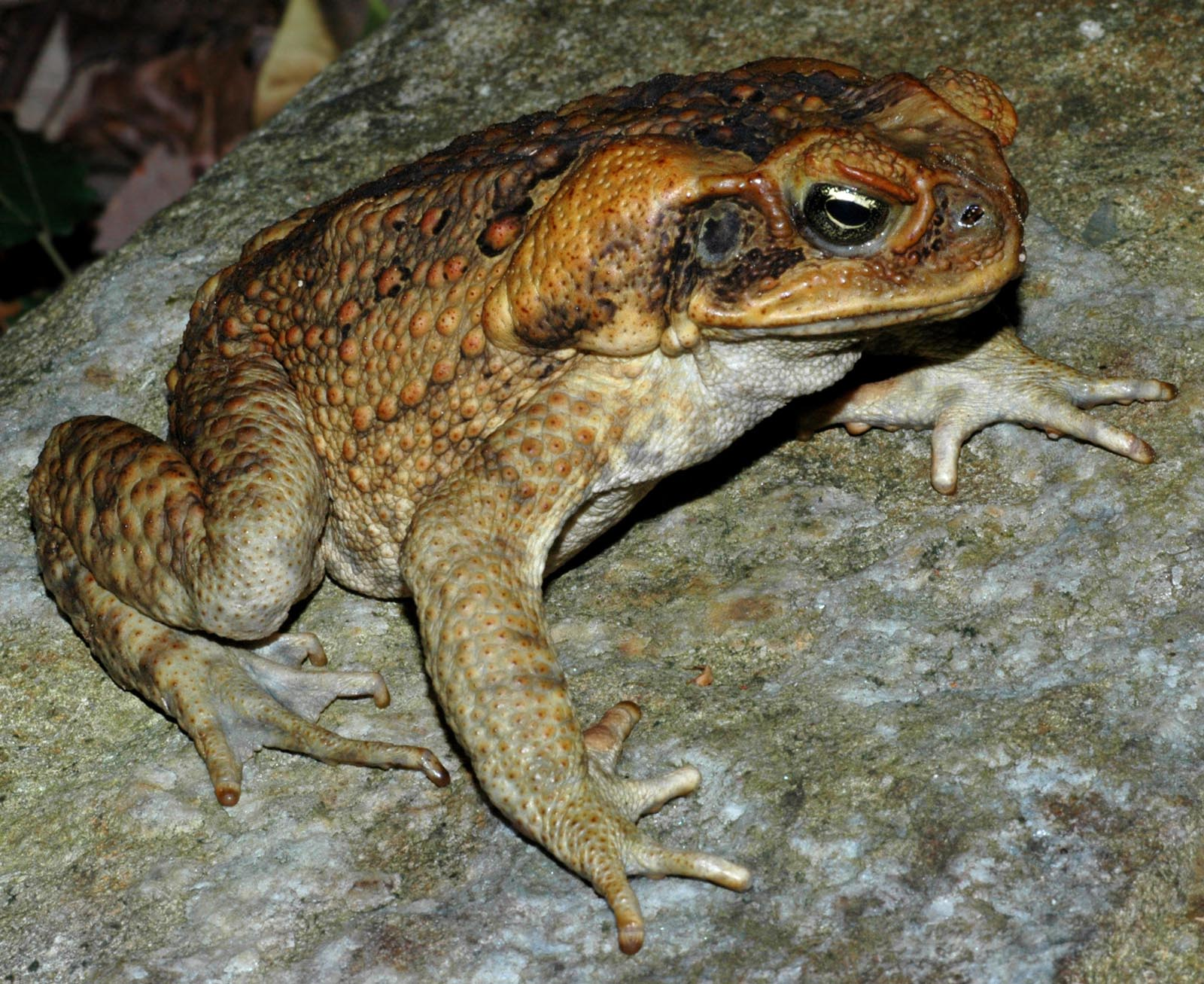
Bufo marinus

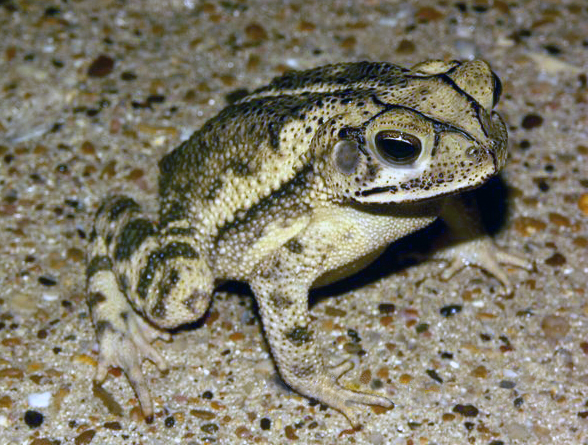
Bufo valliceps

Order: Anura. Family: Bufonidae

True toads (Bufonidae) are a family in the order of Anura (frogs and toads). They are the only family of anurans all members of which are known as "toads". True toads are widespread and occur natively on every continent except Australia and Antarctica, inhabiting a variety of environments, from arid areas to rainforest. Most lay eggs in paired strings that hatch into tadpoles. True toads are toothless and generally warty in appearance. They have a pair of parotoid glands on the back of their heads. These glands contain an alkaloid poison which the toads excrete when stressed. Some toads, like the cane toad Bufo marinus, are more toxic than others. The bufonids now comprise more than 35 genera, Bufo being the most widespread and well known. 12 species occur in Guatemala.

- Bocourt's toad – Bufo bocourti Brocchi, 1877
- Campbell's forest toad – Bufo campbelli Mendelson, 1994
- Dwarf toad – Bufo canaliferus Cope, 1877
- Southern round-gland toad – Bufo coccifer Cope, 1866
- Jalapa toad – Bufo ibarrai Stuart, 1954 [EN]
- Yellow toad – Bufo luetkenii Boulenger, 1891
- Large-crested toad – Bufo macrocristatus Firschein & Smith, 1957 [VU]
- Cane toad – Bufo marinus (Linnaeus, 1758)
- Volcan Tacana toad – Bufo tacanensis P. Smith, 1952 [EN]
- Bufo tutelarius Mendelson, 1997 [EN]
- Gulf Coast toad – Bufo valliceps Wiegmann, 1833
- Bufo wilsoni Baylor & Stuart, 1961

=== Hylidae ===
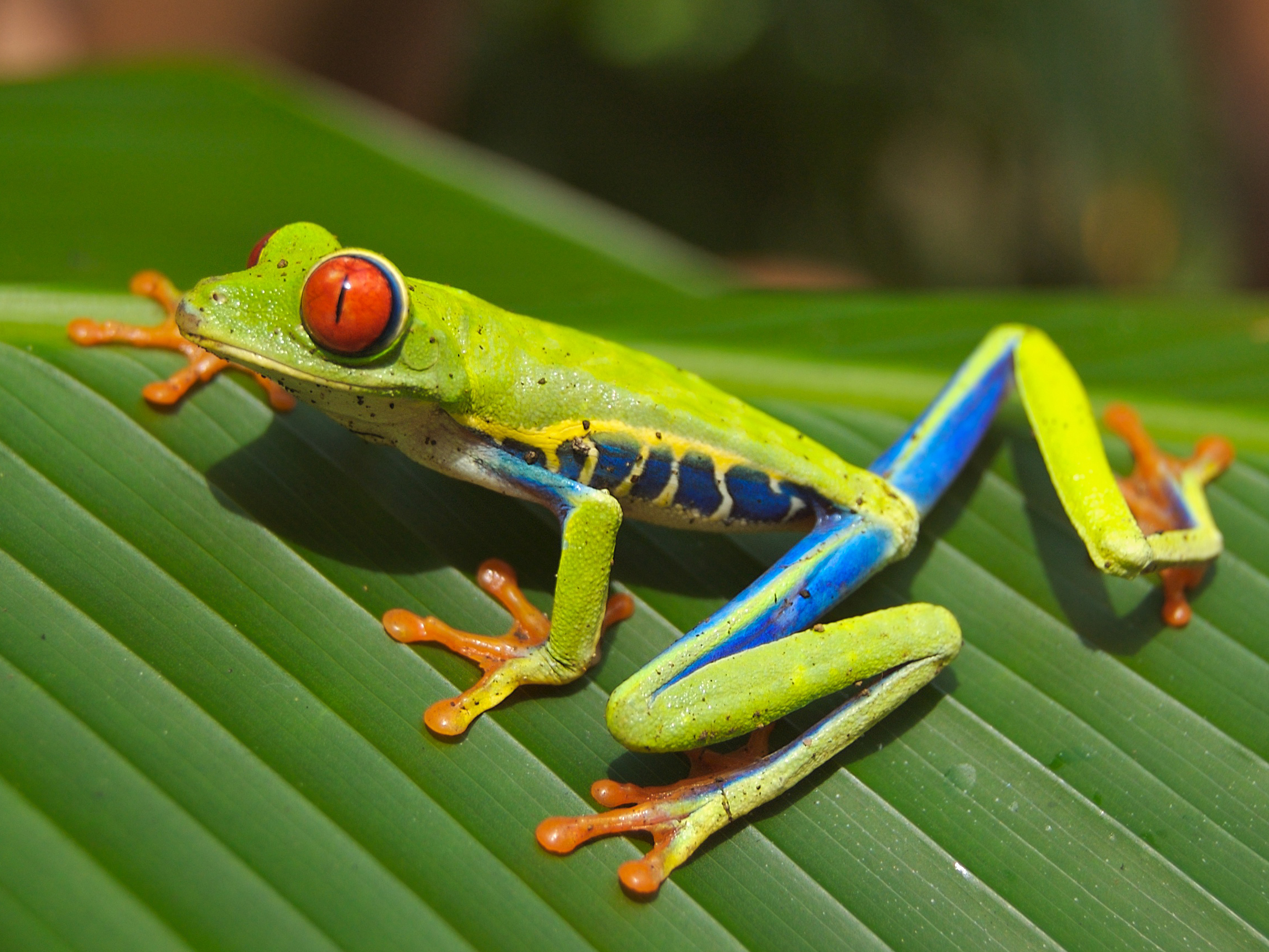
Agalychnis callidryas

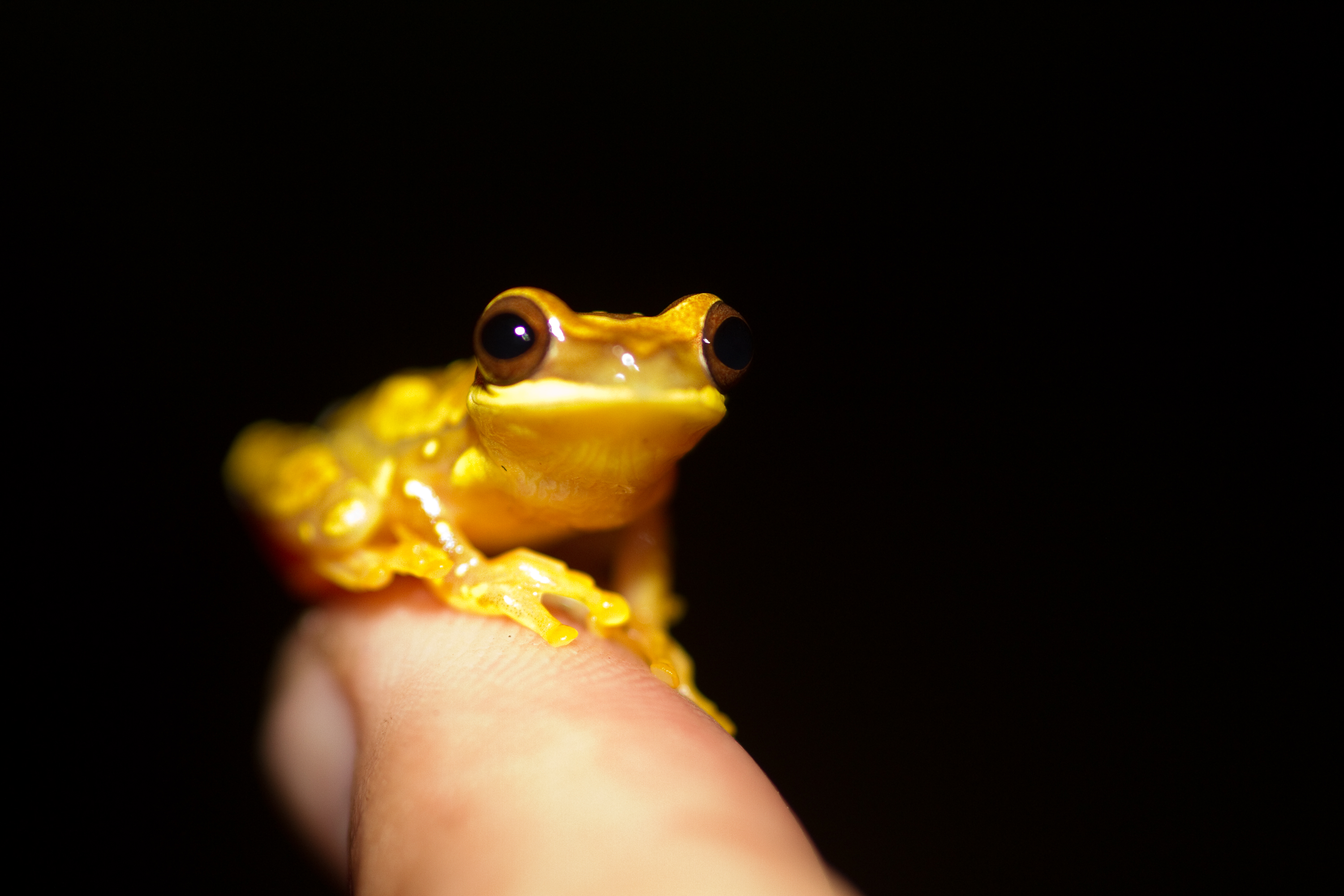
Dendropsophus ebraccatus

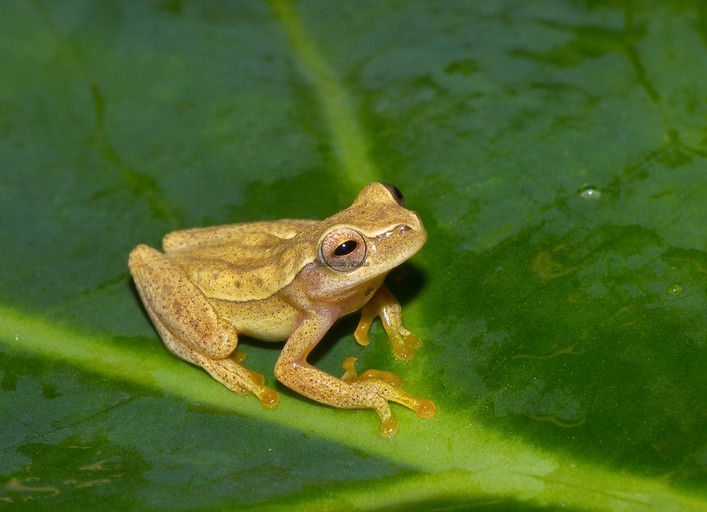
Dendropsophus microcephalus

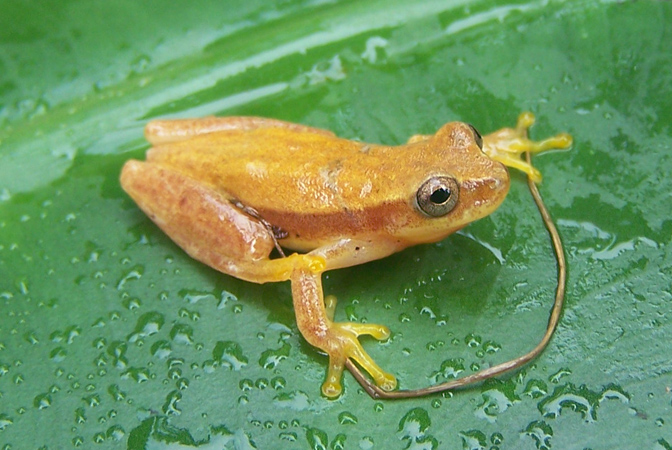
Dendropsophus robertmertensi

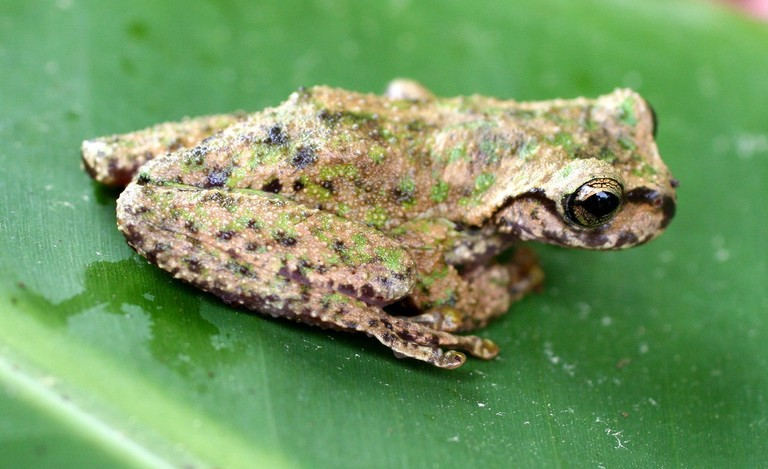
Plectrohyla guatemalensis

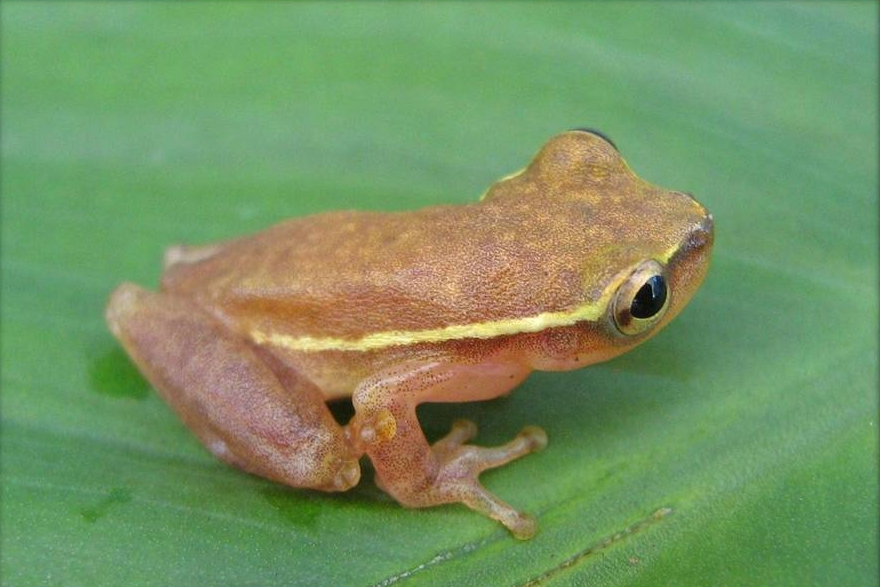
Tlalocohyla picta

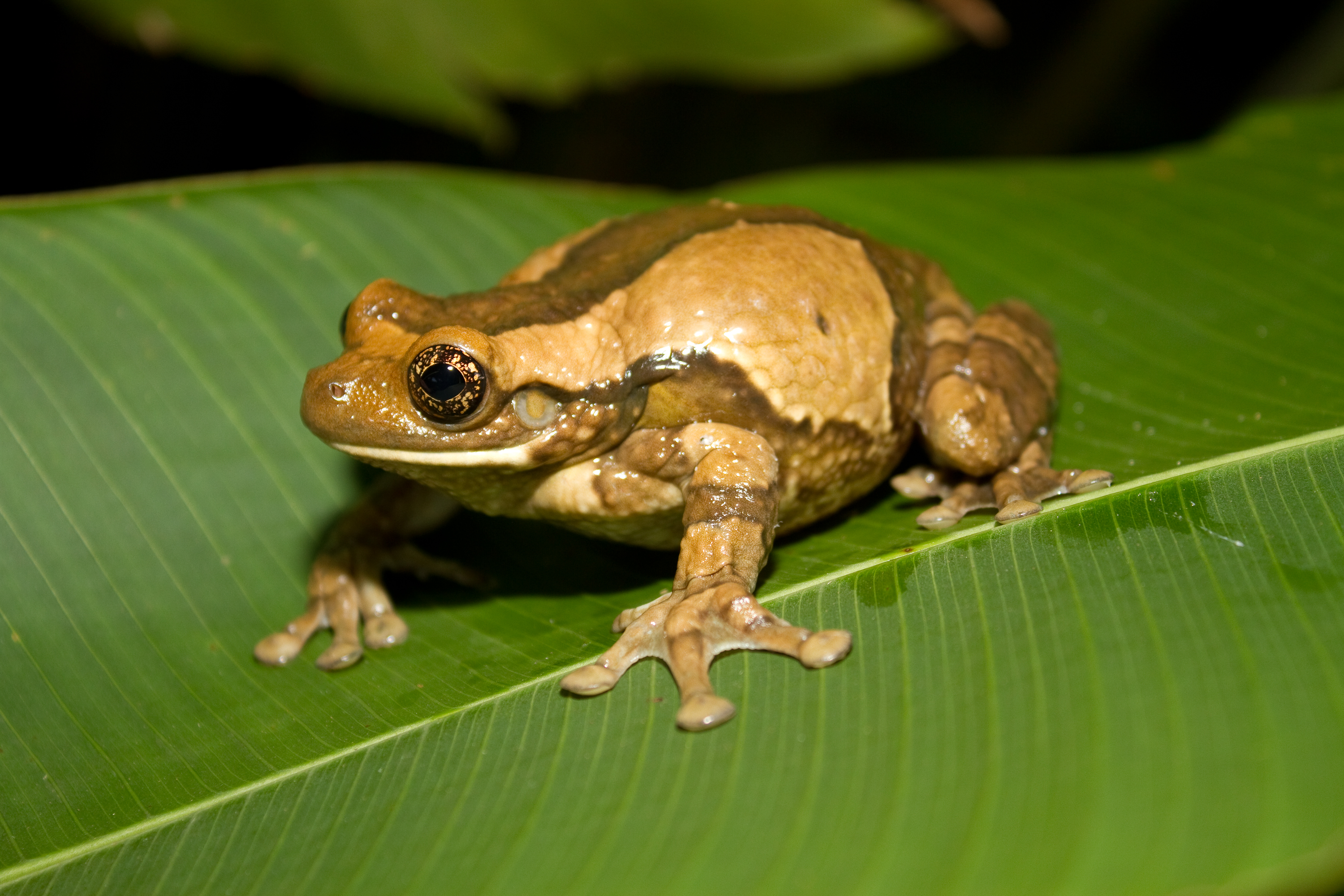
Trachycephalus venulosus

Order: Anura. Family: Hylidae

Hylidae is a wide-ranging family of frogs commonly referred to as "tree frogs and their allies". However, the hylids include a diversity of frog species, many of which do not live in trees, but are terrestrial or semi-aquatic. Most hylids show adaptations suitable for an arboreal lifestyle, including forward-facing eyes providing binocular vision, and adhesive pads on the fingers and toes. In the non-arboreal species, these features may be greatly reduced, or absent. The Cyclorana species are burrowing frogs, that spend much of their lives underground. Hylids mostly feed on insects and other invertebrates, but some larger species can feed on small vertebrates. Hylids lay their eggs in a range of different locations, depending on species. Many use ponds, or puddles that collect in the holes of their trees, while others use bromeliads or other water-holding plants. Other species lay their eggs on the leaves of vegetation overhanging water, allowing the tadpoles to drop into the pond when they hatch. A few species use fast-flowing streams, attaching the eggs firmly to the substrate. The tadpoles of these species have suckers enabling them to hold onto rocks after they hatch. Another unusual adaptation is found in some South American hylids, which brood the eggs on the back of the female. Hylids are distributed in the Americas, Eurasia, extreme north of Africa, Australia, New Guinea and Japan. 38 species occur in Guatemala.

- Red-eyed tree frog – Agalychnis callidryas (Cope, 1862)
- Black-eyed tree frog – Agalychnis moreletii (Duméril, 1853) [CR]
- Bromeliad treefrog – Bromeliohyla bromeliacia Schmidt, 1933 [EN]
- Hourglass treefrog – Dendropsophus ebraccatus Cope, 1874
- Yellow treefrog – Dendropsophus microcephalus Cope, 1886
- Mertens' yellow treefrog – Dendropsophus robertmertensi Taylor, 1937
- Schmidt's mountain brook frog – Duellmanohyla schmidtorum (Stuart, 1954) [VU]
- Copan brook frog – Duellmanohyla soralia (Wilson & MCCranie, 1985) [CR]
- Guatemala treefrog – Ecnomiohyla minera Wilson, McCranie & Williams, 1985 [E, EN]
- Copan treefrog – Ecnomiohyla salvaje Wilson, McCranie & Williams, 1985 [CR]
- Bocourt's tree frog – Hyla bocourti Mocquard, 1899 [E, CR]
- Hyla perkinsi Campbell & Brodie, 1992 [E, CR]
- Walker's tree frog – Hyla walkeri Stuart, 1954 [VU]
- Plectrohyla acanthodes Duellman & Campbell, 1992 [CR]
- Plectrohyla avia Stuart, 1953 [CR]
- Ptychohyla dendrophasma Campbell, Smith & Acevedo, 2000 [CR]
- Plectrohyla glandulosa (Boulenger, 1883) [EN]
- Plectrohyla guatemalensis Brocchi, 1877 [CR]
- Plectrohyla hartwegi Duellman, 1968 [CR]
- Plectrohyla ixil Stuart, 1942 [CR]
- Plectrohyla matudai Hartweg, 1941 [VU]
- Plectrohyla pokomchi Duellman & Campbell, 1984 [E, CR]
- Plectrohyla quecchi Stuart, 1942 [E, CR]
- Plectrohyla sagorum Hartweg, 1941 [EN]
- Plectrohyla tecunumani Duellman & Campbell, 1984 [E, CR]
- Plectrohyla teuchestes Duellman & Campbell, 1992 [E, CR]
- Ptychohyla euthysanota (Kellogg, 1928)
- Ptychohyla macrotympanum (Tanner, 1957) [CR]
- Ptychohyla panchoi Duellman & Campbell, 1982 [E, EN]
- Ptychohyla hypomykter McCranie & Wilson, 1993 [CR]
- Ptychohyla sanctaecrucis Campbell & Smith, 1992 [E, CR]
- Scinax staufferi (Cope, 1865)
- Smilisca baudinii (Duméril & Bibron, 1841)
- Smilisca cyanosticta (Smith, 1953)
- Mahogany treefrog – Tlalocohyla loquax Gaige & Stuart, 1934
- Painted treefrog – Tlalocohyla picta (Günther, 1901)
- Veined treefrog – Trachycephalus venulosus Laurenti, 1768
- Triprion petasatus (Cope, 1865)

=== Centrolenidae ===
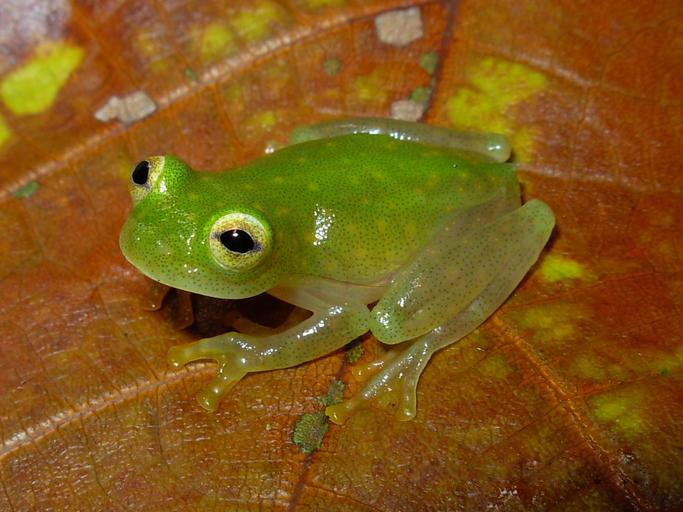
Hyalinobatrachium fleischmanni

Order: Anura. Family: Centrolenidae

Glass frogs (Centrolenidae) are a family of generally small frogs, ranging from 3 to 7.5 centimetres (1.2 to 3.0 in) in length, distributed from southern Mexico, through Central America and South America. While the general background coloration of most glass frogs is primarily lime green, the abdominal skin of some members of this family is transparent. The internal viscera, including the heart, liver, and gastrointestinal tract are visible through this translucent skin, hence the common name. There is one species in Guatemala.

- Fleischmann's glass frog – Hyalinobatrachium fleischmanni (Boettger, 1893)

=== Microhylidae ===
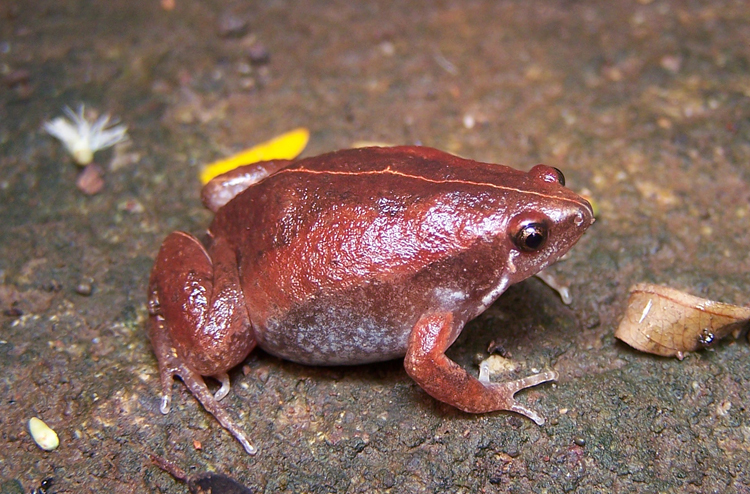
Gastrophryne usta

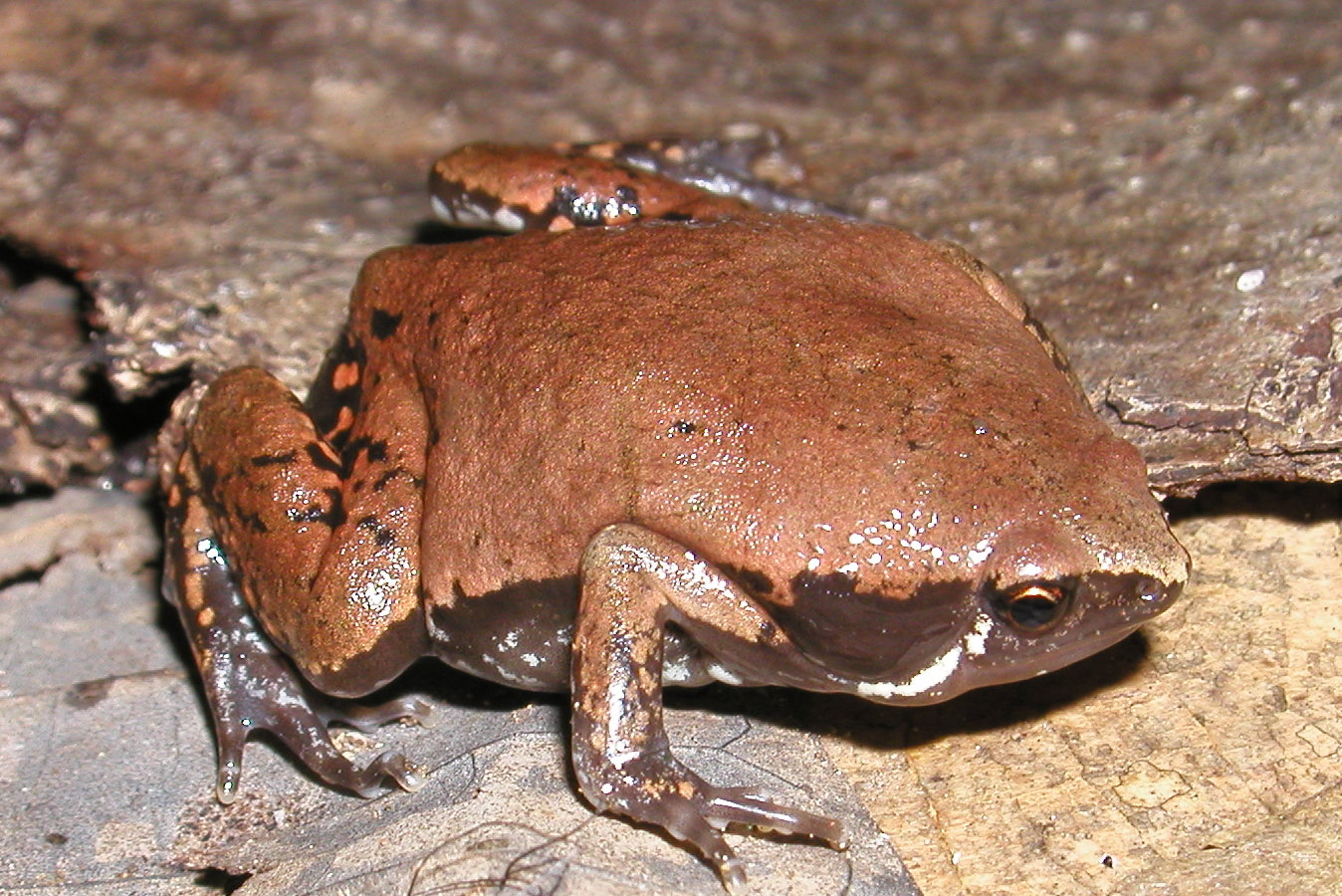
Hypopachus variolosus

Order: Anura. Family: Microhylidae

Microhylidae is a geographically widespread family of frogs. Microhylids are mostly small frogs. Many species are below 1.5 centimetres (0.59 in) in length, although some species are as large as 9 centimetres (3.5 in). They can be arboreal or terrestrial, and some will even habit close to water. The ground dwellers are often found under leaf litter within forests, occasionally venturing out at night to hunt. There are two main shapes for the microhylids, one with wide bodies and narrow mouths, and the other with normal frog proportions. Those with narrow mouths generally eat termites and ants, and the others have diets typical of most frogs. The species of the genus Breviceps are burrowing frogs found in the arid regions of Africa. Some of their species will even lay their eggs under ground. Frogs from Microhylidae occur throughout the tropical and warm temperate regions of the Americas, Africa, eastern India, Sri Lanka, south-east Asia, through New Guinea and Australia. There are nine subfamilies, 68 genera, and 495 species worldwide, 5 of which occur in Guatemala.

- Gastrophryne elegans (Boulenger, 1882)
- Gastrophryne usta (Cope, 1866)
- Hypopachus barberi Schmidt, 1939 [VU]
- Hypophachus championi Stuart, 1940
- Hypopachus variolosus (cope, 1866)

=== Ranidae ===
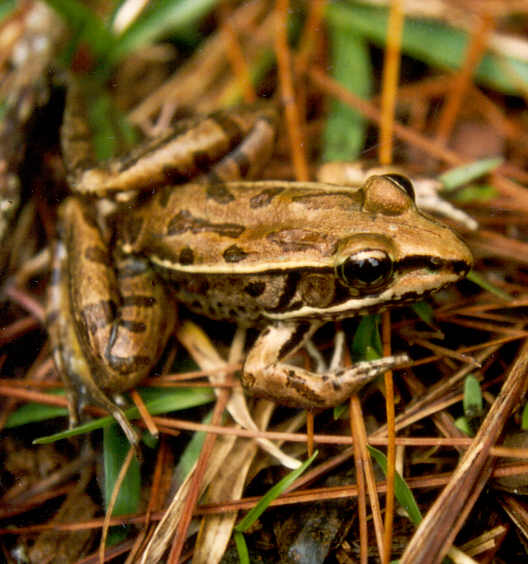
Rana berlandieri

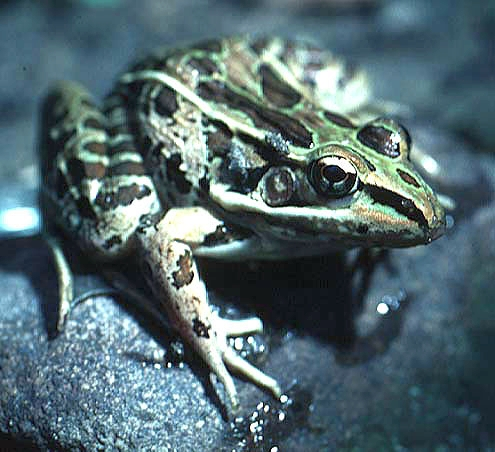
Rana forreri

Order: Anura. Family: Ranidae

The true frogs, family Ranidae, have the widest distribution of any frog family. They are abundant throughout most of the world, occurring on all continents except Antarctica. Typically, true frogs are smooth, moist-skinned frogs, with large, powerful legs and extensively webbed feet. True frogs vary greatly in size, ranging from small—such as the wood frog (Rana sylvatica)—to the largest frog in the world, the Goliath frog (Conraua goliath). Many of the true frogs are aquatic or live close to water. Most species lay their eggs in the water and go through a tadpole stage. However, as with most families of frogs, there is large variation of habitat within the family. Those of the genus Tomopterna are burrowing frogs native to Africa and exhibit most of the characteristics common to burrowing frogs around the world. There are also arboreal species of true frogs, and the family includes some of the very few amphibians that can live in brackish water. There are 6 species in Guatemala.

- Rana berlandieri Baird, 1854
- Rana forreri Boulenger, 1883
- Rana juliani Hillis & de Sá, 1988
- Rana macroglossa Brocchi, 1877 [VU]
- Rana maculata Brocchi, 1877
- Rana vaillanti Brocchi, 1877

== See also ==
- List of birds of Guatemala
- List of mammals of Guatemala
- List of reptiles of Guatemala
