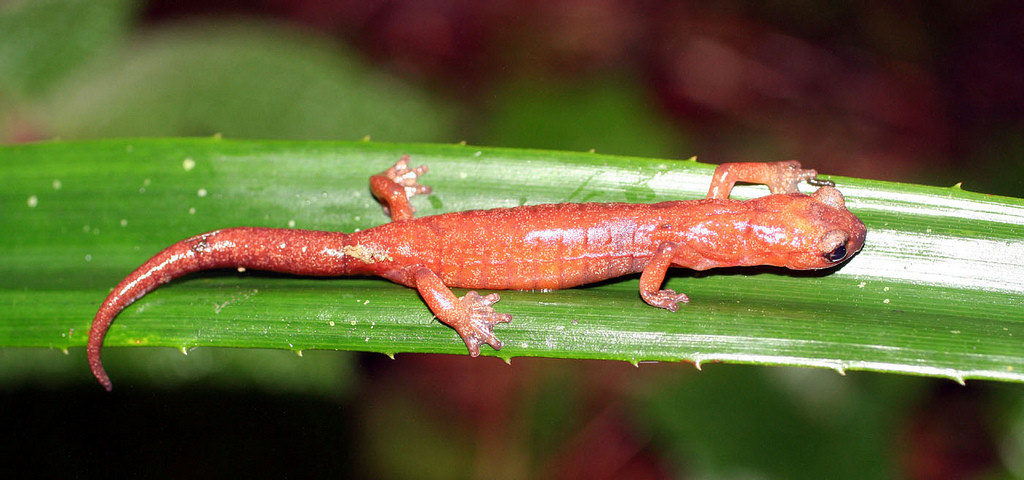
- Bolitoglossa celaque

Scientific classification
- Domain: Eukaryota
- Kingdom: Animalia
- Phylum: Chordata
- Class: Amphibia
- Order: Urodela
- Family: Plethodontidae
- Subfamily: Bolitoglossinae; Hallowell, 1856

Genera
- Batrachoseps; Bolitoglossa; Bradytriton; Chiropterotriton; Dendrotriton; Nototriton; Nyctanolis; Oedipina; Parvimolge; Pseudoeurycea; Thorius

= Bolitoglossinae =

Subfamily of amphibians

Bolitoglossinae is a subfamily of lungless salamander. Most of them are native to tropical areas in Central and South America, though a few such as Batrachoseps are found in temperate regions. Its sister group is the extinct genus Palaeoplethodon.
