= Jackson's climbing salamander =

Conservation status
- Critically Endangered (IUCN 3.1)

Scientific classification
- Kingdom: Animalia
- Phylum: Chordata
- Class: Amphibia
- Order: Urodela
- Family: Plethodontidae
- Genus: Bolitoglossa
- Species: B. jacksoni

Binomial name
- Bolitoglossa jacksoni Elias, 1984

Species of amphibian

Jackson's climbing salamander (Bolitoglossa jacksoni) is a species of salamander in the family Plethodontidae. It is endemic to Guatemala. Its natural habitat is subtropical or tropical moist montane forests. It is threatened by habitat loss. The salamander is among the 25 "most wanted lost" species that are the focus of Global Wildlife Conservation's "Search for Lost Species" initiative, as it had not been seen since 1975. It was rediscovered in 2017 at an amphibian reserve in the Sierra de los Cuchumatanes.

== Appearance ==
Females of the species grow up to 65 mm long and are a bright yellow with a dorsal, chocolate brown band and a thin white stripe running between the brown band and the yellow. The brown band generally runs across the middle of the entire body and a very large part of the tail. The species has suckers on its fingers so it can climb trees. The eyes are also yellow in color.

== Habitat ==
Because Jackson's climbing salamander has only been observed three times, its habitat is not fully known. According to the IUCN, the species occurs in a very limited area, approximately 12 km north-northeast of Santa Cruz Barillas. The juvenile male was photographed more than 300 meters higher than the altitude at which scientists had thought the species would occur (approximately 1400 meters.

== Expeditions ==
The species was discovered by Jeremy Jackson and Paul Elias during a 1972 expedition. During this expedition the species Bradytriton silus and Nyctanolis pernix were also discovered. All three species were only found again after 2009. Bradytriton silus was seen again in 2009, Nyctanolis pernix in 2010 and Bolitoglossa jacksoni only again in 2017.

This species is among the previous 25 "most wanted missing" species on Re:wild's previous "lost species" list. This is because has only been observed up to and including 2017. Two individuals have been captured. Of these, only the holotype of the species, a young adult female, has been preserved. The older female was captivity at the Museum of Vertebrate Zoology, University of California - Berkeley. She eventually, possibly, escaped, or was stolen from the museum. The most recent discovery may be a juvenile male.
