= Pseudoeurycea exspectata =

Conservation status
- Extinct (1976) (IUCN 3.1)

Scientific classification
- Kingdom: Animalia
- Phylum: Chordata
- Class: Amphibia
- Order: Urodela
- Family: Plethodontidae
- Genus: Pseudoeurycea
- Species: †P. exspectata

Binomial name
- †Pseudoeurycea exspectata Stuart, 1954

Extinct species of amphibian

Pseudoeurycea exspectata, also known as the Jalpa false brook salamander, is an extinct species of salamander in the family Plethodontidae. It was endemic to Guatemala.

== Description ==
Jalpa false brook salamanders looked extremely similar to the closely related Pseudoeurycea goebeli, differing by lacking light marbling on the underside of their tail, having a lighter upper tail surface, and having darker legs. They were robust, with short, blunt snouts. The ventral side of their body was a dark gray-blue, while their dorsal side was a dark reddish-brown.

== Distribution and habitat ==
The Jalpa false brook salamander was endemic to Guatemala, and was the southeastern-most member of its genus. The species was only known from its type locality, a broadleaf forest west of Cerro Miramundo at an elevation of 2525 meters (8284 feet). It was believed that they also inhabited nearby isolated volcanic peaks.

In their habitat, Jalpa false brook salamanders could be found within or beneath damp, rotten logs, living inside burrows made by wood-boring beetles. They were also found on bromeliads.

== History ==
The holotype was collected on March 21, 1952, by herpetologist Laurence Cooper Stuart, and formally described in 1954. It used to be a relatively common species in its range, but habitat loss due to logging and livestock farming caused the population to dramatically decrease. The last known sighting occurred in 1976.

Ten trips to the type locality to search for the salamander between 1985 and 2000 did not record the species, and it was added to the IUCN Red List as Critically Endangered in 2004. Eight more searches for the salamander between 2005 and 2018 failed to find any, and it was declared extinct after by the IUCN in August 2019.
