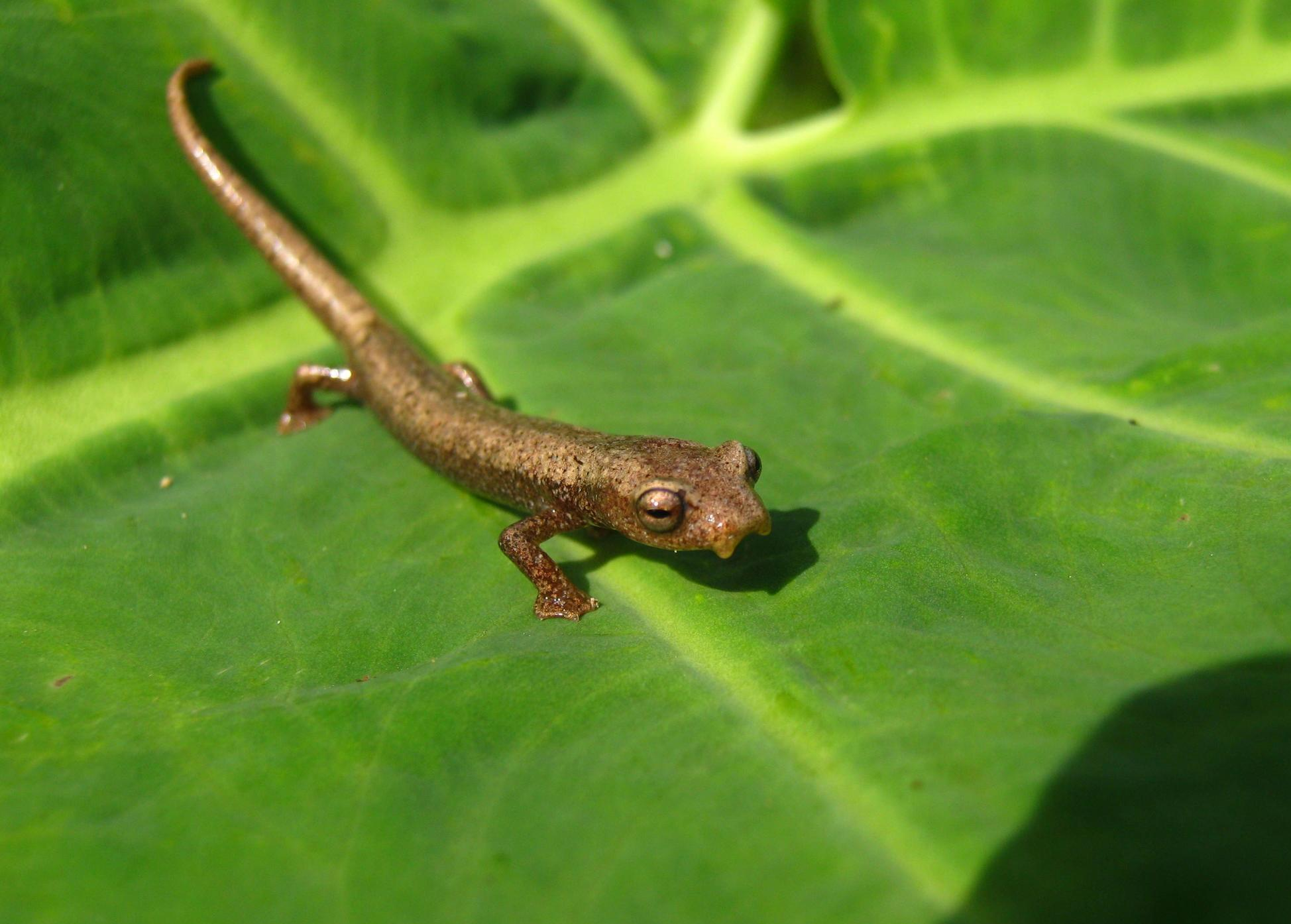

Conservation status
- Least Concern (IUCN 3.1)

Scientific classification
- Kingdom: Animalia
- Phylum: Chordata
- Class: Amphibia
- Order: Urodela
- Family: Plethodontidae
- Genus: Bolitoglossa
- Species: B. rufescens

Binomial name
- Bolitoglossa rufescens (Cope, 1869)

Synonyms
- Oedipus rufescens Cope, 1869

= Northern banana salamander =

Species of amphibian

The northern banana salamander (Bolitoglossa rufescens), also known as common dwarf salamander or rufescent salamander, is a species of salamander in the family Plethodontidae (lungless salamanders). It is found in the Atlantic slopes of Meso-America from San Luis Potosi, Veracruz, and northern Chiapas in Mexico continuing on to the southern part of Guatemala, Belize, and northern Honduras. However, its range south of Mexico is uncertain because the records may refer to other species.

== Description and ecology ==
The northern banana salamanders are small terrestrial, arboreal salamanders. Their size ranges from 35–36 mm (1.4–1.4 in) snout–vent length and 65–70 mm (2.6–2.8 in) total length. It dwells in tropical and subtropical moist lowland rain forests and mountain ecosystems, as well as in citrus orchards, banana plantations, and pine plantations. Predominantly found in bromeliads in tropical and subtropical wet forests.

B.rufescens is dorsally pale brown to tan brown in color and on paler species it may consist of dorsal longitudinal streaks or specks. The ventral area in most species is grey or paler than the dorsal color, in some the coloring might be uniform. A dark brown streaks usually runs from behind the eyes and extend towards is posterior, it may go as far as half the length of the body or farther. Northern banana salamanders are rather small in size when compared to other salamanders in the genus Bolitoglossa such as the O'Donnell's salamander (Bolitoglossa odonnelli) which are longer in length. The northern banana salamander has a robust body with ll costal grooves running longitudinally between its legs and 3 additional costal grooves in between their limbs. This grooves assist salamanders in water transportation, enhances respiration and aids in thermo-regulation. They possess webbed fingers and toes, with 4 digits on its front limb and 5 digits on its hind limbs. Its snout is truncate and slightly projected on its anterior dorsal view. This species are lungless salamanders, they lack lungs and breath entirely through their skin and lining of their mouth.

== Diet ==
Salamanders mostly feed on small invertebrates found on forest floors. Diet is influenced by size and micro-habitat of the salamander. Bolitoglossa rufescens are small and strictly arboreal, research shows that their diet is comprised significantly of ants followed by beetles and weevils (Coleoptera), collembolans, and arachnids.

== Behavior ==
Snakes are major predators of salamanders they sense their prey by flickering their tongue in the air or by direct contact with prey or substrates. Anti-predator behavior studies show that Bolitoglossa rufescens responds more often to predator attacks that involved stimulation to the head other than its tail or trunk area. It responds by elevating or elevating and undulating its tail.

== Reproduction ==
The northern banana salamanders reproduce biennially. Internal fertilization takes place after successful courtship, where the male salamander during the breeding season develops an enlarge courtship gland used to stimulate the female. The female picks up egg packets from substratum through cloaca. After fertilization eggs are laid on moist places on land. These salamanders have an average clutch size of 13.5 and an average egg diameter of 1.9 mm. Eggs develop entirely on land, and direct development occurs. Sexual dimorphism is minimal between males and females of this species.
