= Stuart's salamander =

Conservation status
- Vulnerable (IUCN 3.1)

Scientific classification
- Kingdom: Animalia
- Phylum: Chordata
- Class: Amphibia
- Order: Urodela
- Family: Plethodontidae
- Genus: Bolitoglossa
- Species: B. stuarti

Binomial name
- Bolitoglossa stuarti Wake & Brame, 1969

Species of amphibian

Stuart's salamander (Bolitoglossa stuarti) is a species of salamander in the family Plethodontidae, found in Guatemala and Mexico. Its natural habitats are subtropical or tropical dry forests and subtropical or tropical moist montane forests. This salamander is threatened by habitat loss.
