= Oedipina stenopodia =

Conservation status
- Endangered (IUCN 3.1)

Scientific classification
- Kingdom: Animalia
- Phylum: Chordata
- Class: Amphibia
- Order: Urodela
- Family: Plethodontidae
- Genus: Oedipina
- Species: O. stenopodia

Binomial name
- Oedipina stenopodia Brodie & Campbell, 1993

Species of amphibian

Oedipina stenopodia is a species of salamander in the family Plethodontidae. It is endemic to Guatemala.

Its natural habitats are subtropical or tropical moist montane forests, plantations, and rural gardens.
