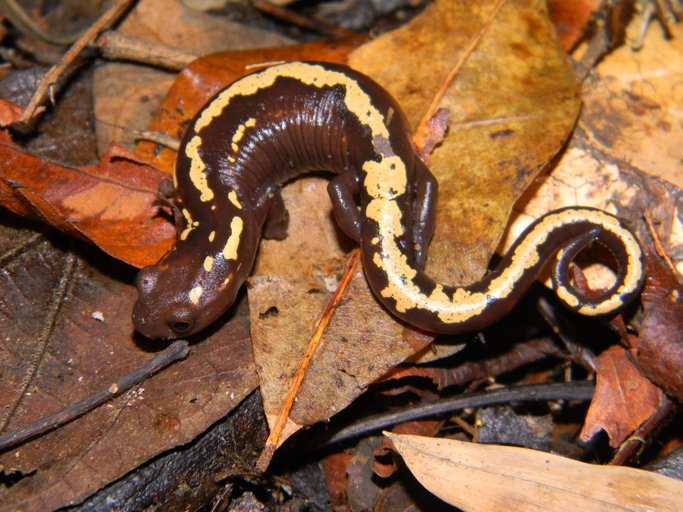

Conservation status
- Vulnerable (IUCN 3.1)

Scientific classification
- Kingdom: Animalia
- Phylum: Chordata
- Class: Amphibia
- Order: Urodela
- Family: Plethodontidae
- Genus: Bolitoglossa
- Species: B. mulleri

Binomial name
- Bolitoglossa mulleri (Brocchi, 1883)

Synonyms
- Spelerpes copei Brocchi, 1883

= Bolitoglossa mulleri =

Species of amphibian

Bolitoglossa mulleri (Spanish: Salamandra De Müller) is a species of salamander in the family Plethodontidae. It is found in Guatemala and Mexico. Its natural habitats are subtropical or tropical moist lowland forests, subtropical or tropical moist montane forests, plantations, and rural gardens. It is threatened by habitat loss.
