= Pseudoeurycea rex =

Conservation status
- Vulnerable (IUCN 3.1)

Scientific classification
- Kingdom: Animalia
- Phylum: Chordata
- Class: Amphibia
- Order: Urodela
- Family: Plethodontidae
- Genus: Pseudoeurycea
- Species: P. rex

Binomial name
- Pseudoeurycea rex (Dunn, 1921)

Synonyms
- Oedipus rex Dunn, 1921

Species of amphibian

Pseudoeurycea rex, which has been given the common name royal false brook salamander, is a species of salamander in the family Plethodontidae. It is found in western Guatemala; on Volcán Tacaná, its range extends to the Mexican side of the Guatemalan–Mexican border.

== Description ==
Males can reach 89 mm (3.5 in) and females 90 mm (3.5 in) in total length; the tail makes up just above one half of the total length. The head is bluntly oval. The tail is circular in cross section and constricted at the base. The limbs are well-developed. Both the fingers and the toes have basal webbing. The body is pinkish gray above, shading into gray in sides of body and tail. The tail has some white marbling and is light gray beneath. The throat has white marbling, and the upper surface of the snout has some light marbling too.

== Habitat and conservation ==
Pseudoeurycea rex occurs in coniferous forests of the temperate forest zone, par-like forest, and above tree line in open bunchgrass communities; its altitudinal range is 2,450–4,000 m (8,040–13,120 ft) above sea level, although it mostly occurs above 2,800 m (9,200 ft). It can survive in degraded forest. Development is direct, without free-living larval stage. The types were collected from under logs.

Pseudoeurycea rex used to be the most abundant Guatemalan salamander that could reach very high densities, but it has declined dramatically and is now extremely rare. The reasons for this dramatic decline are unknown. It is threatened by habitat loss caused by overgrazing by livestock, clear-cutting of forest, and human settlement. Its range overlaps with several protected areas.
