= Franklin's climbing salamander =

Conservation status
- Vulnerable (IUCN 3.1)

Scientific classification
- Kingdom: Animalia
- Phylum: Chordata
- Class: Amphibia
- Order: Urodela
- Family: Plethodontidae
- Genus: Bolitoglossa
- Species: B. franklini

Binomial name
- Bolitoglossa franklini (Schmidt, 1936)

Synonyms
- Bolitoglossa nigroflavescens Taylor, 1941; Magnadigita brevipes Bumzahem & Smith, 1955

Species of amphibian

Franklin's climbing salamander (Bolitoglossa franklini) is a species of salamander in the family Plethodontidae. It is found in Guatemala and Mexico. Its natural habitat is subtropical or tropical moist lowland forests. It is threatened by habitat loss.
