= Oak forest salamander =

Conservation status
- Endangered (IUCN 3.1)

Scientific classification
- Kingdom: Animalia
- Phylum: Chordata
- Class: Amphibia
- Order: Urodela
- Family: Plethodontidae
- Genus: Bolitoglossa
- Species: B. cuchumatana

Binomial name
- Bolitoglossa cuchumatana (Stuart, 1943)

Species of amphibian

The oak forest salamander (Bolitoglossa cuchumatana) is a species of salamander in the family Plethodontidae. It is endemic to Guatemala. Its natural habitat is subtropical or tropical moist montane forests. It is threatened by habitat loss.
