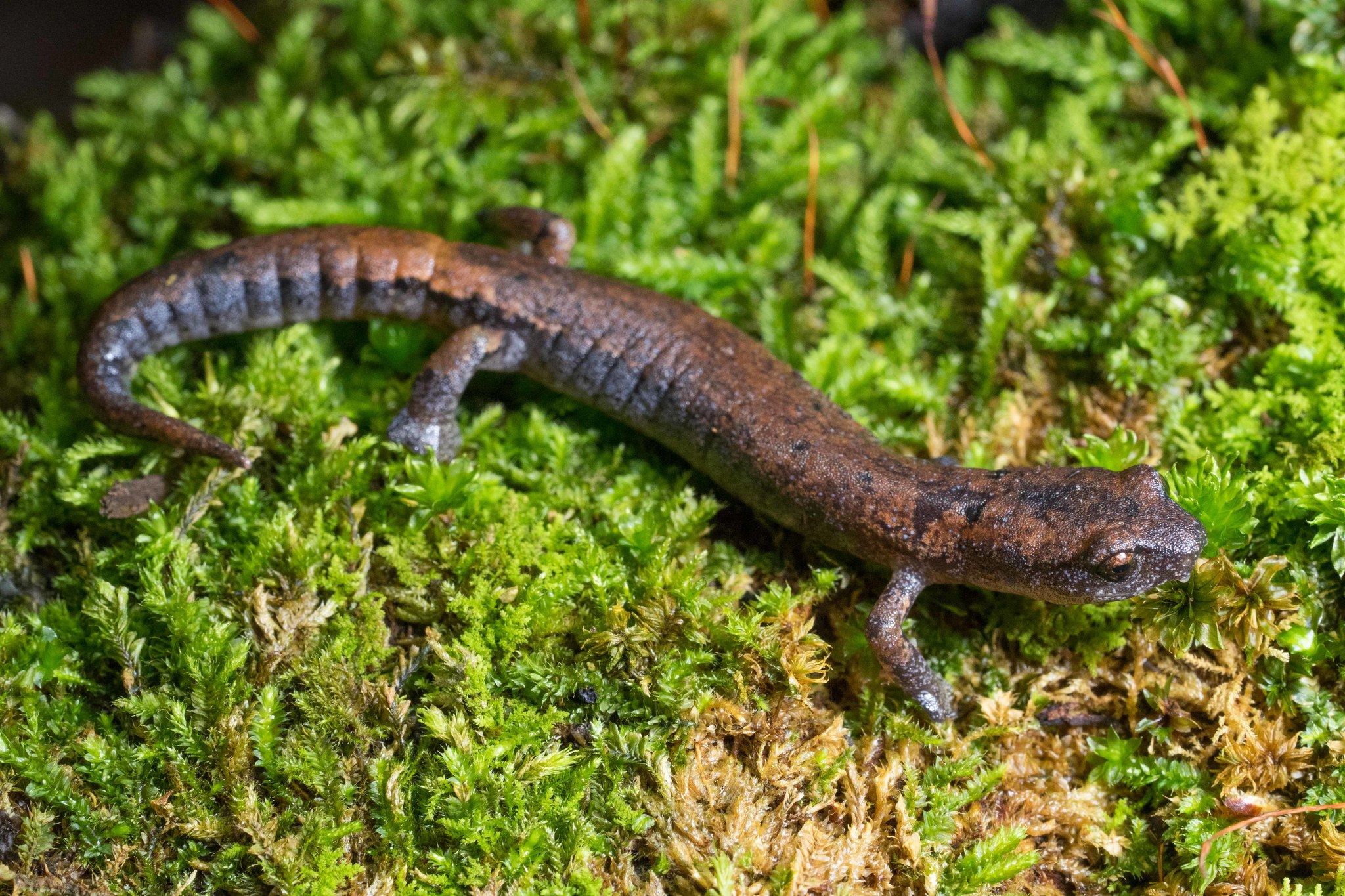

Conservation status
- Vulnerable (IUCN 3.1)

Scientific classification
- Kingdom: Animalia
- Phylum: Chordata
- Class: Amphibia
- Order: Urodela
- Family: Plethodontidae
- Genus: Bolitoglossa
- Species: B. hartwegi

Binomial name
- Bolitoglossa hartwegi Wake and Brame, 1969

= Hartweg's climbing salamander =

Species of amphibian

Hartweg's climbing salamander (Bolitoglossa hartwegi), also known as Hartweg's mushroomtongue salamander, and Hartweg's salamander, is a species of salamander in the family Plethodontidae. It is found in the north-central Chiapas, Mexico, and the adjacent Guatemalan Sierra de los Cuchumatanes.

== Etymology ==
This species is named after Norman Hartweg, American herpetologist and "an able scientist who spent many years studying Chiapan amphibians and reptiles and who stimulated and guided many investigations of the biology of tropical organisms."

== Description ==
Males measure 34–47 mm (1.3–1.9 in) and females 34–54 mm (1.3–2.1 in) in snout–vent length (SVL). The tail is robust and about two thirds of SVL. The body is robust and the snout is relatively short and truncate. The limbs are slender and moderately long. The hands and feet are relatively large.

== Habitat and conservation ==
Its natural habitats are coniferous and oak forests, often in association with limestone outcrops, at elevations of 1,200–2,800 m (3,900–9,200 ft) above sea level. It lives in crevices, sometimes found under flakes of rock or under the bark of logs, but even arboreal bromeliads. It is a common species that tolerates habitat modification reasonably well, although habitat loss can still be a threat.
