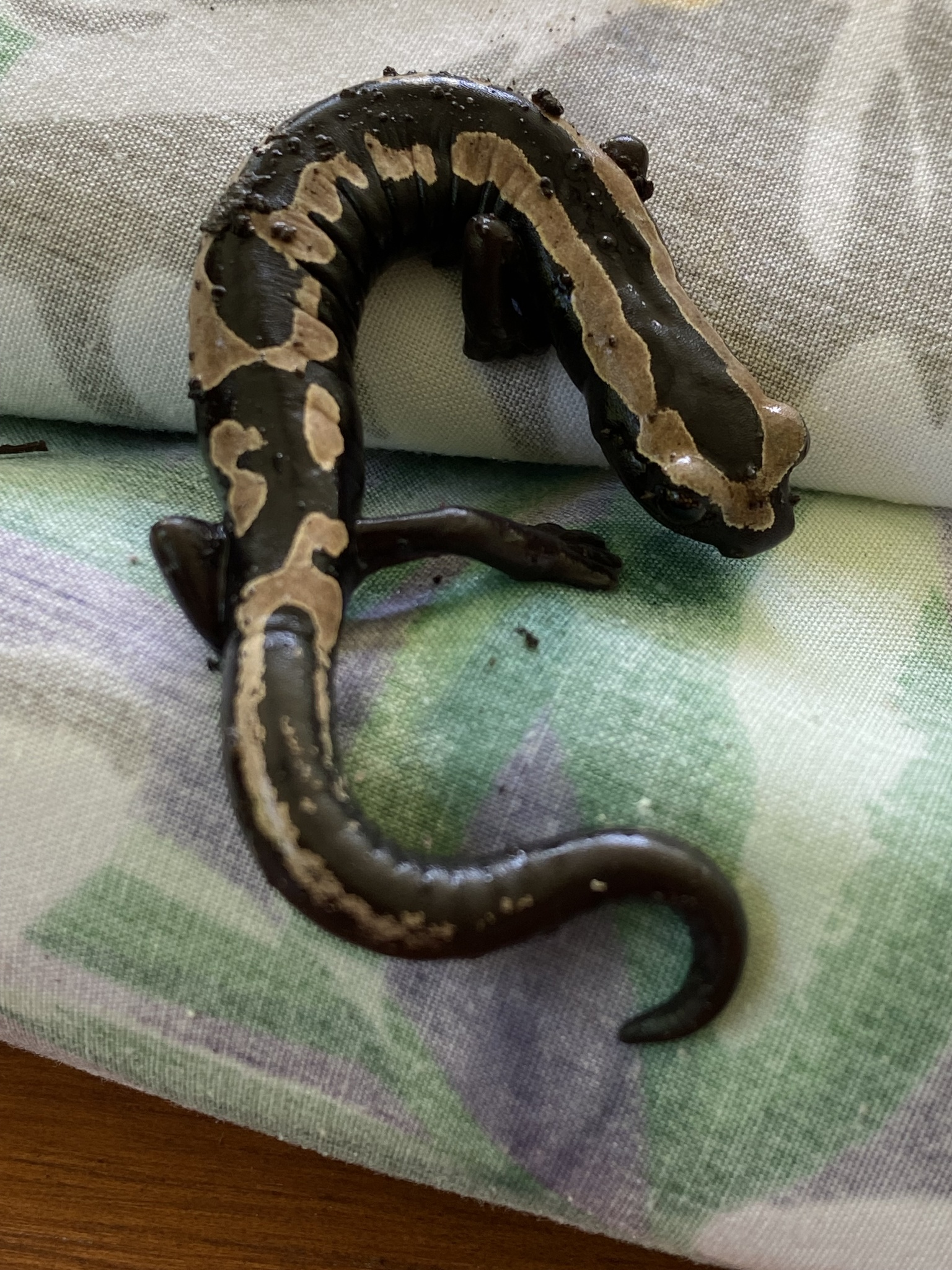

Conservation status
- Vulnerable (IUCN 3.1)

Scientific classification
- Kingdom: Animalia
- Phylum: Chordata
- Class: Amphibia
- Order: Urodela
- Family: Plethodontidae
- Genus: Bolitoglossa
- Species: B. salvinii

Binomial name
- Bolitoglossa salvinii (Gray, 1868)

Synonyms
- List: Oedipus attitlanensis (Brocchi, 1883); Oedipus carbonarius subsp. salvinii Gray, 1868; Oedipus salvinii Gray, 1868; Oedipus variegatus subsp. salvinii Gray, 1868; Spelerpes attitlanensis Brocchi, 1883; Spelerpes salvinii (Gray, 1868)

= Salvin's salamander =

Species of amphibian

Salvin's salamander (Bolitoglossa salvinii), also known as Salvin's mushroomtongue salamander, is a species of salamander in the family Plethodontidae. It is found in El Salvador and Guatemala. Its natural habitats are subtropical or tropical moist lowland forests, subtropical or tropical moist montane forests, pastureland, plantations, and heavily degraded former forest. It is threatened by habitat loss.

== Habitat ==
Bolitoglossa salvinii primarily resides in the upper coastal plain of southern Guatemala and specific locations in El Salvador. Its habitat spans elevations from 600 to 1,250 meters above sea level, but urbanization and habitat decline pose significant threats, especially in El Salvador, leading to a suspected population decrease.

== Conservation status and concerns ==
Designated as vulnerable to extinction by the International Union for Conservation of Nature, Bolitoglossa salvinii faces conservation challenges due to a severely fragmented range covering 7,329 square kilometers. Ongoing habitat decline and fragmentation in Guatemala and El Salvador may be contributing to a suspected population decrease. Originally inhabiting tropical lowland and premontane forests, the species now predominantly occupies shaded coffee plantations surrounded by remnants of forests. With historical records in El Salvador dating back more than 50 years, the species is considered rare, and its continued existence is threatened by urbanization.

== Threats ==
Bolitoglossa salvinii faces multiple threats that jeopardize its existence. These challenges are primarily attributed to habitat destruction, climate change, human beliefs, and the potential introduction of a deadly fungus, Batrachochytrium salamandrivorans.
