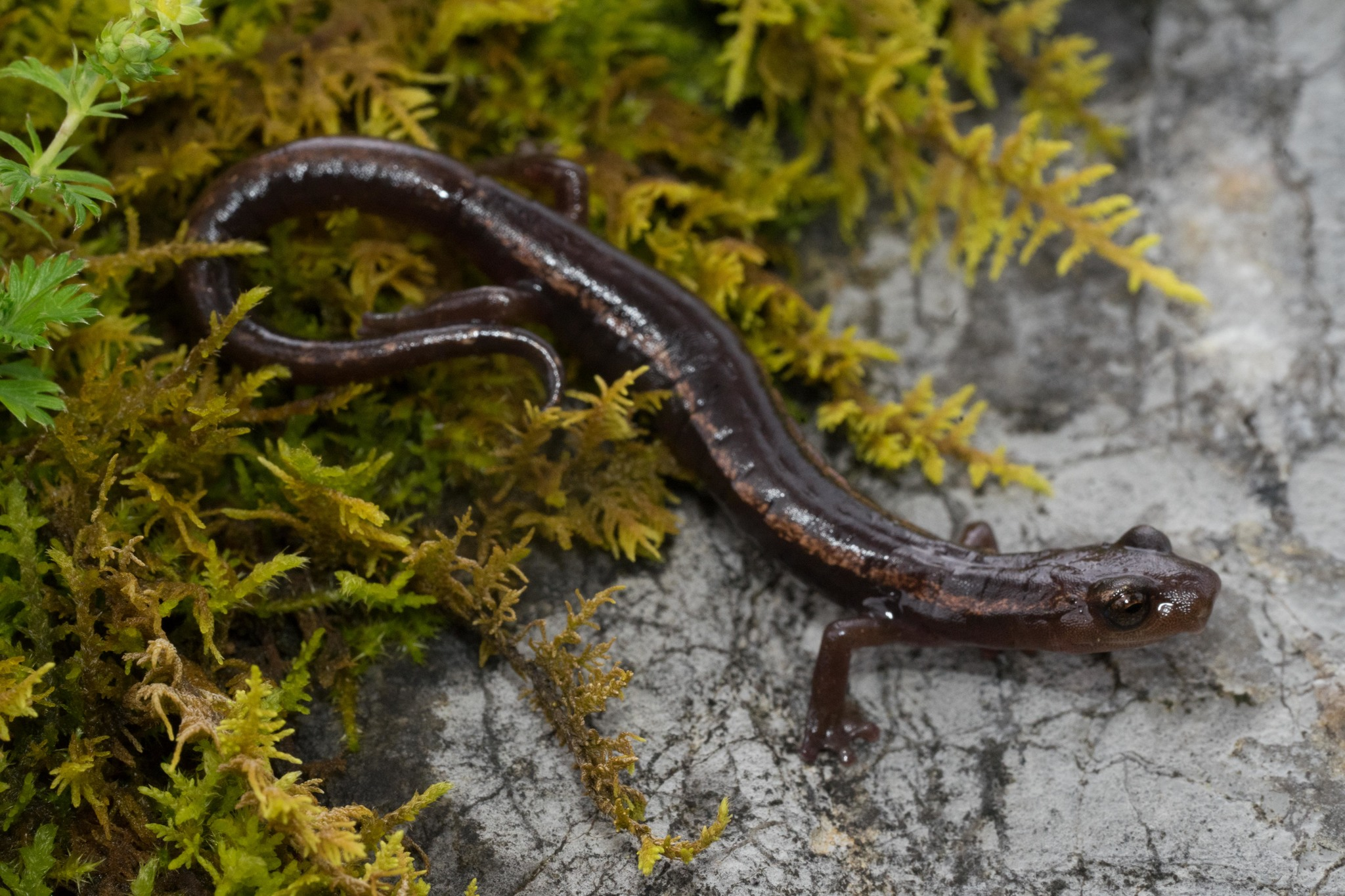

Conservation status
- Near Threatened (IUCN 3.1)

Scientific classification
- Kingdom: Animalia
- Phylum: Chordata
- Class: Amphibia
- Order: Urodela
- Family: Plethodontidae
- Genus: Bolitoglossa
- Species: B. rostrata

Binomial name
- Bolitoglossa rostrata (Brocchi, 1833)

= Bolitoglossa rostrata =

Species of amphibian

Bolitoglossa rostrata is a species of salamander in the family Plethodontidae. It is found in Guatemala and Mexico. Its natural habitats are subtropical or tropical moist montane forests and heavily degraded former forest. It is threatened by habitat loss.

== Sources ==
- Acevedo, M. & Wake, D. 2004. Bolitoglossa rostrata. 2012 IUCN Red List of Threatened Species. Downloaded on 16 October 2012.
