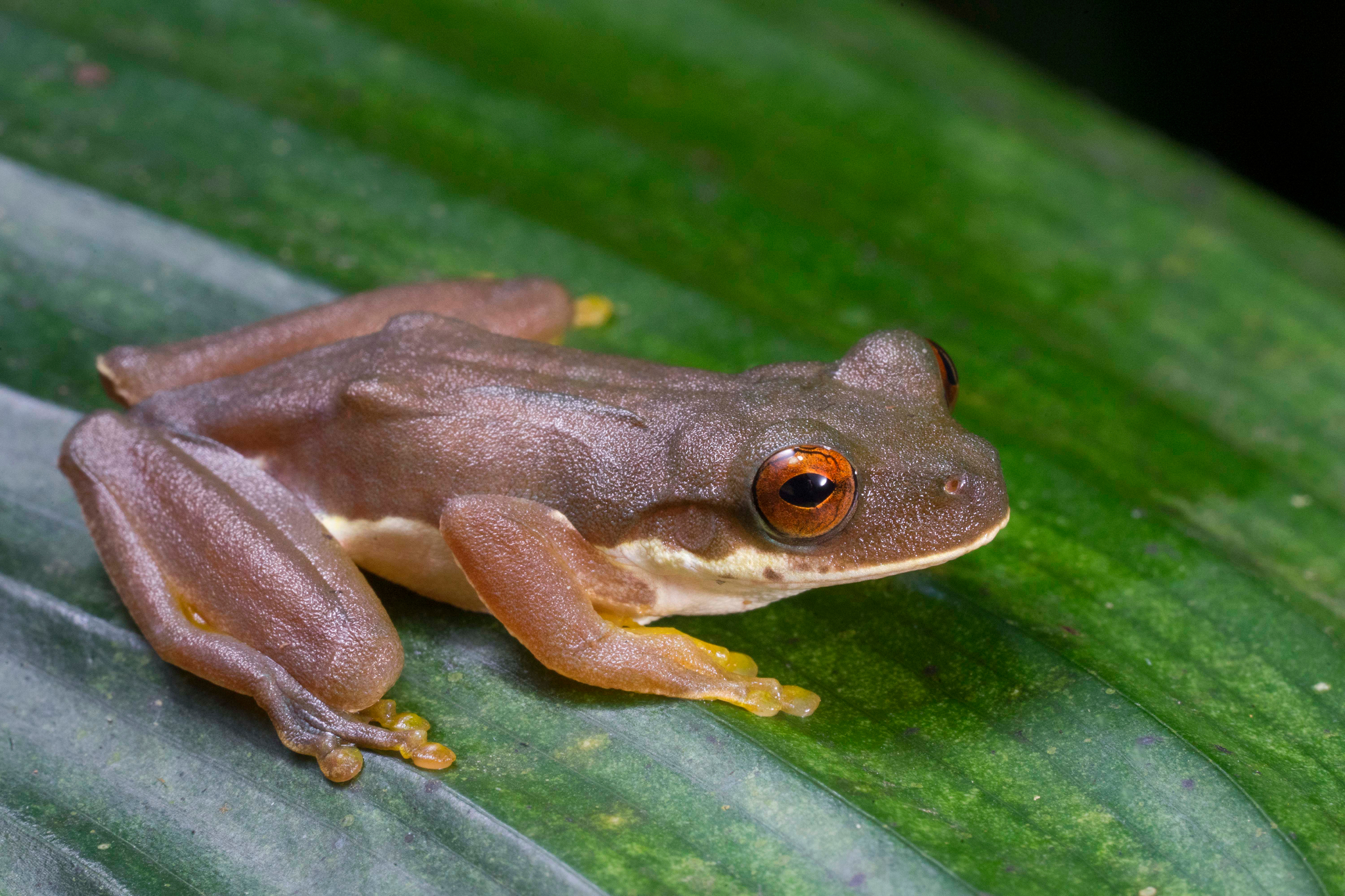

Conservation status
- Near Threatened (IUCN 3.1)

Scientific classification
- Kingdom: Animalia
- Phylum: Chordata
- Class: Amphibia
- Order: Anura
- Family: Hylidae
- Genus: Duellmanohyla
- Species: D. schmidtorum

Binomial name
- Duellmanohyla schmidtorum (Stuart, 1954)

Synonyms
- Ptychohyla schmidtorum Stuart, 1954

= Schmidt's mountain brook frog =

Species of amphibian

Schmidt's mountain brook frog (Duellmanohyla schmidtorum) is a species of frog in the family Hylidae. It is endemic to the Pacific slopes of the Sierra Madre de Chiapas in southwestern Guatemala and southern Mexico in eastern Oaxaca and southwestern Chiapas. It is named after Karl Patterson Schmidt, American herpetologist, and his brother Frank, who collected with him.

The species' natural habitats are montane cloud forests, elevations 1,300–2,200 m (4,300–7,200 ft) above sea level. It is threatened by habitat loss caused by deforestation and infrastructure development, and possibly, chytridiomycosis.
