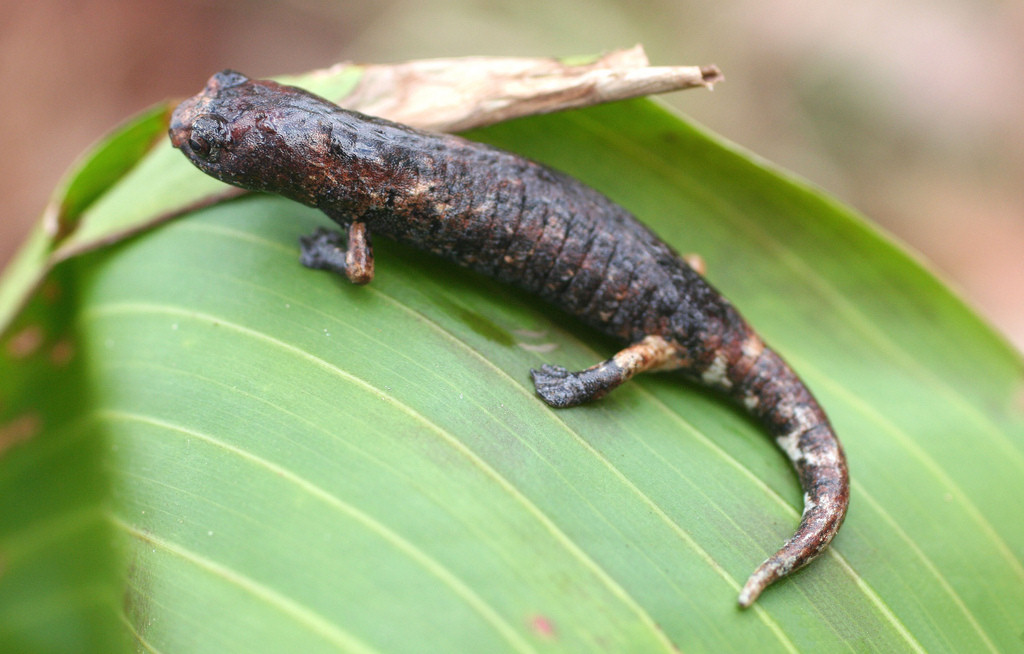

Conservation status
- Near Threatened (IUCN 3.1)

Scientific classification
- Kingdom: Animalia
- Phylum: Chordata
- Class: Amphibia
- Order: Urodela
- Family: Plethodontidae
- Genus: Bolitoglossa
- Species: B. dofleini

Binomial name
- Bolitoglossa dofleini (Werner, 1903)

= Doflein's salamander =

Species of amphibian

Doflein's salamander (Bolitoglossa dofleini) is a species of salamander in the family Plethodontidae. It is found in Belize, Guatemala, Nicaragua and Honduras. Its natural habitats are subtropical or tropical moist lowland forests, subtropical or tropical moist montane forests, plantations, and heavily degraded former forest. An example ecoregion of occurrence is the Belizean pine forests. The species is threatened by habitat loss.
