= Dendrotriton cuchumatanus =

Conservation status
- Critically Endangered (IUCN 3.1)

Scientific classification
- Kingdom: Animalia
- Phylum: Chordata
- Class: Amphibia
- Order: Urodela
- Family: Plethodontidae
- Genus: Dendrotriton
- Species: D. cuchumatanus

Binomial name
- Dendrotriton cuchumatanus (Lynch and Wake, 1975)

Synonyms
- Chiropterotriton cuchumatanus Lynch and Wake, 1975

Species of amphibian

Dendrotriton cuchumatanus is a species of salamander in the family Plethodontidae. It is endemic to Guatemala and is known from its type locality near San Juan Ixcoy in the Sierra de los Cuchumatanes, and possibly from another, as yet unconfirmed record. Common name forest bromeliad salamander has been coined for it, although it does not seem to inhabit bromeliads.

== Description ==
Males grow to at least 31 mm (1.2 in) and females to 32 mm (1.3 in) in snout–vent length. The tail is relatively short, and only barely exceeds the body length in adult males; relative tail length is shorter in juveniles and females. The limbs are moderately long in males but shorter in females. The hands and feet are moderately webbed. Th coloration and patterning are variable, but discrete color morphs are not evident. Many individuals have a red-brown to tan-colored mid-dorsal stripe. Some specimens have a distinctly mottled gray and brown dorsal pattern, while others are essentially uniformly gray-black to brown-black dorsally. Almost all specimens have a lighter interorbital bar.

== Habitat and conservation ==
Dendrotriton cuchumatanus is known from very humid oak forest at about 2,860 m (9,380 ft) above sea level. Specimens have been found under moss and bark on large fallen trees and in moss (but not in bromeliads as for many of its relatives). The species is threatened by habitat loss caused by forest clearance. As of 2008, the type locality was inside a proposed semi-protected area.
