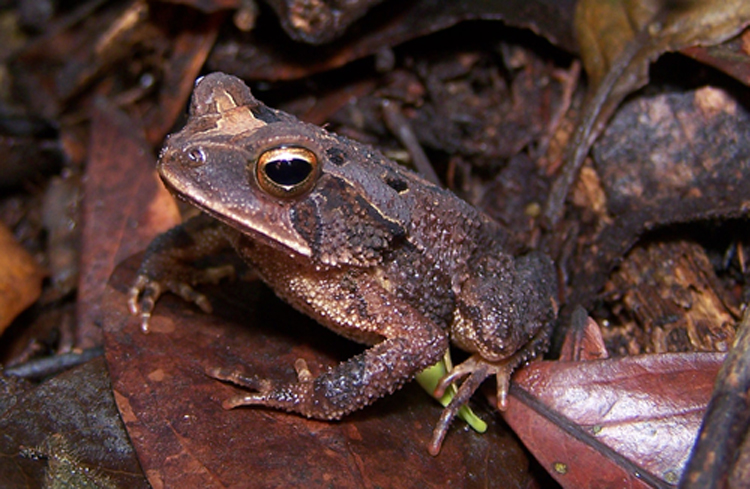

Conservation status
- Least Concern (IUCN 3.1)

Scientific classification
- Kingdom: Animalia
- Phylum: Chordata
- Class: Amphibia
- Order: Anura
- Family: Bufonidae
- Genus: Incilius
- Species: I. canaliferus

Binomial name
- Incilius canaliferus (Cope, 1877)

Synonyms
- Bufo canaliferus Cope, 1877; Cranopsis canaliferus (Cope, 1877); Ollotis canalifera (Cope, 1877)

= Incilius canaliferus =

Species of amphibian

Incilius canaliferus, also known as the dwarf toad, is a species of toad in the family Bufonidae. It is found along the Pacific slopes of western El Salvador, Guatemala, and southern Mexico (Oaxaca and Chiapas states). Its natural habitats are semi-deciduous forests near rivers and moderate-sized streams. Breeding takes place in ponds and streams. It also occurs in disturbed habitats, for example coffee plantations. Habitat loss and possibly water pollution are threats to this toad.
