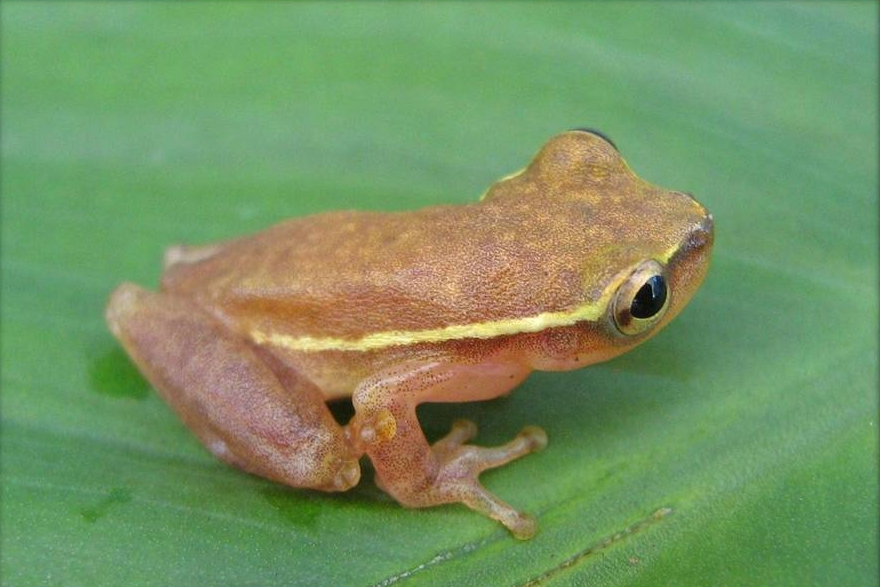

Conservation status
- Least Concern (IUCN 3.1)

Scientific classification
- Kingdom: Animalia
- Phylum: Chordata
- Class: Amphibia
- Order: Anura
- Family: Hylidae
- Genus: Tlalocohyla
- Species: T. picta

Binomial name
- Tlalocohyla picta (Günther, 1901)

= Painted tree frog =

Species of amphibian

The painted tree frog (Tlalocohyla picta) is a species of frog in the family Hylidae found in Belize, Guatemala, Honduras, and Mexico. Its natural habitats are subtropical or tropical dry forests, subtropical or tropical moist lowland forests, freshwater marshes, intermittent freshwater marshes, pastureland, plantations, rural gardens, heavily degraded former forests, ponds, and canals and ditches. This frog has been observed 1300 meters above sea level.
