= Coban climbing salamander =

Conservation status
- Vulnerable (IUCN 3.1)

Scientific classification
- Kingdom: Animalia
- Phylum: Chordata
- Class: Amphibia
- Order: Urodela
- Family: Plethodontidae
- Genus: Bolitoglossa
- Species: B. helmrichi

Binomial name
- Bolitoglossa helmrichi Schmidt, 1836

Species of amphibian

The Coban climbing salamander (Bolitoglossa helmrichi) is a species of salamander in the family Plethodontidae. It is endemic to Guatemala. Its natural habitats are subtropical or tropical moist montane forests and plantations . It is threatened by habitat loss.
