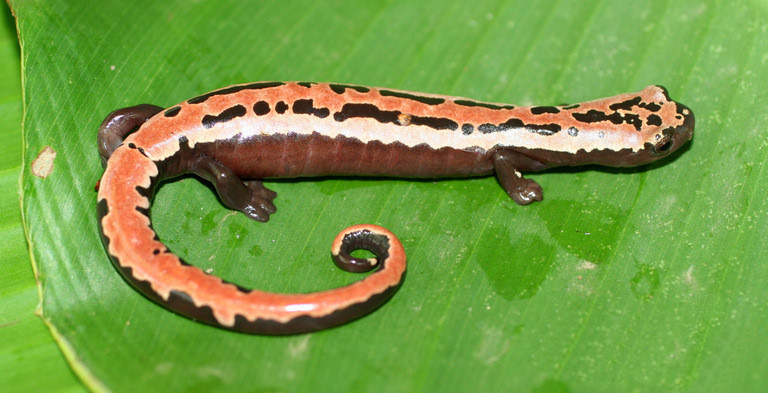

Conservation status
- Least Concern (IUCN 3.1)

Scientific classification
- Kingdom: Animalia
- Phylum: Chordata
- Class: Amphibia
- Order: Urodela
- Family: Plethodontidae
- Genus: Bolitoglossa
- Species: B. mexicana

Binomial name
- Bolitoglossa mexicana Duméril, Bibron and Duméril, 1854

Synonyms
- Bolitoglossa moreleti Smith, 1945

= Mexican climbing salamander =

Species of amphibian

The Mexican climbing salamander (Bolitoglossa mexicana) is a species of salamander in the family Plethodontidae. It is found in Belize, Guatemala, Honduras, Mexico, and possibly Nicaragua. Its natural habitats are subtropical or tropical dry forests, subtropical or tropical moist lowland forests, subtropical or tropical moist montane forests, plantations, and rural gardens. It is threatened by habitat loss. Like other members of the family Plethodontidae, the Mexican climbing salamander is lungless and breathes entirely through its skin, which requires moist habitats for gas exchange and limits water loss. It reproduces through direct development, with embryos hatching as miniature adults rather than passing through a free-living larval stage. Its habitat selection and behavior are strongly influenced by the tradeoff between oxygen absorption and water loss, with smaller individuals benefiting from greater oxygen uptake at the cost of increased water loss.
