= Oedipina ignea =

Conservation status
- Endangered (IUCN 3.1)

Scientific classification
- Kingdom: Animalia
- Phylum: Chordata
- Class: Amphibia
- Order: Urodela
- Family: Plethodontidae
- Genus: Oedipina
- Species: O. ignea

Binomial name
- Oedipina ignea Stuart, 1952

Species of amphibian

Oedipina ignea is a species of salamander in the family Plethodontidae. It is found in Guatemala, Honduras, and possibly El Salvador. Its natural habitat is subtropical or tropical moist montane forests. It is threatened by habitat loss.
