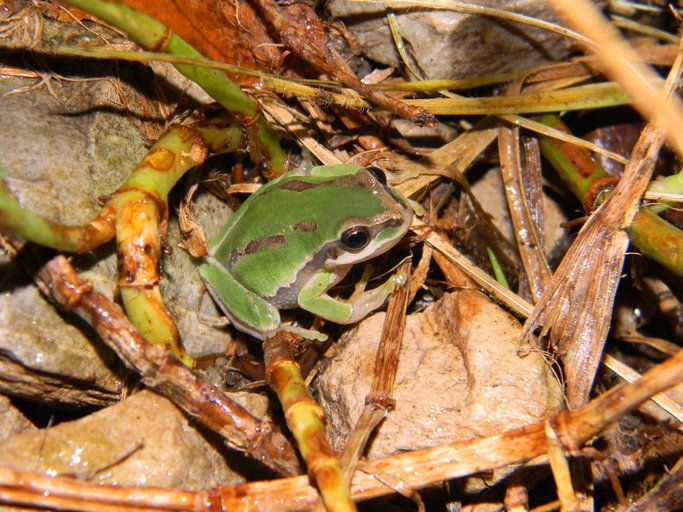

Conservation status
- Vulnerable (IUCN 3.1)

Scientific classification
- Kingdom: Animalia
- Phylum: Chordata
- Class: Amphibia
- Order: Anura
- Family: Hylidae
- Genus: Dryophytes
- Species: D. walkeri

Binomial name
- Dryophytes walkeri (Stuart, 1954)

Synonyms
- Hyla walkeri Stuart, 1954

= Walker's tree frog =

Species of amphibian

Walker's tree frog (Dryophytes walkeri) is a species of frog in the family Hylidae found in Guatemala and Mexico. Its natural habitats are highlands of pine-oak forests and pine-fir forests. It is known to occur in Chiapas Mexico and in parts of Guatemala including the Sierra de los Cuchumatanes mountain range in the west, the plateaus of central Guatemala, and in southeastern Guatemala. However, it is believed that its range is greater than what is currently known. It breeds in temporary ponds, and is threatened by habitat loss.

It is also found in subtropical or tropical moist montane forests, subtropical or tropical seasonally wet or flooded lowland grassland, and intermittent freshwater marshes.
