= Nototriton stuarti =

Conservation status
- Critically Endangered (IUCN 3.1)

Scientific classification
- Kingdom: Animalia
- Phylum: Chordata
- Class: Amphibia
- Order: Urodela
- Family: Plethodontidae
- Genus: Nototriton
- Species: N. stuarti

Binomial name
- Nototriton stuarti Wake & Campbell, 2000

Species of amphibian

Nototriton stuarti is a species of salamander in the family Plethodontidae. Being only known from its type locality in the Izabal Department, it is endemic to Guatemala.

The single known individual was collected inside a log in a very wet forest.
