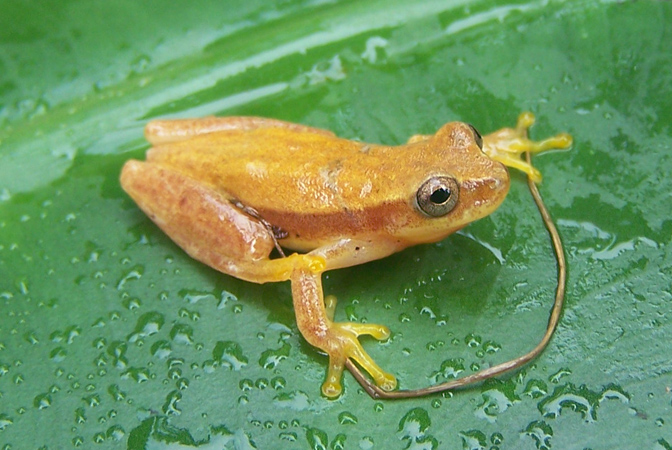

Conservation status
- Least Concern (IUCN 3.1)

Scientific classification
- Domain: Eukaryota
- Kingdom: Animalia
- Phylum: Chordata
- Class: Amphibia
- Order: Anura
- Family: Hylidae
- Genus: Dendropsophus
- Species: D. robertmertensi

Binomial name
- Dendropsophus robertmertensi (Taylor, 1937)

Synonyms
- Hyla robertmertensi Taylor, 1937

= Dendropsophus robertmertensi =

Species of frog

Dendropsophus robertmertensi (vernacular name: Mertens' yellow treefrog) is a species of frog in the family Hylidae. It is found in the Pacific lowlands of El Salvador, Guatemala, and southeastern Mexico (eastern Oaxaca, Chiapas). A separate population exists in the Cintalapa Valley in Chiapas.

== Etymology ==
The specific name robertmertensi honors Robert Mertens, a German zoologist and herpetologist.

== Description ==
Adult males can grow to 26 mm (1.0 in) and adult females to 28 mm (1.1 in) in snout–vent length. The body is slender. The snout is truncate and short. The tympanum is faintly visible. The fingers are short and broad, slightly webbed, and have small discs. The toes are slender and long, about three-fourths webbed, and have discs that are smaller than the finger discs. At night, overall coloration is pale yellow with a white dorsolater line and a pale brown lateral stripe. By day, dorsal coloration is yellowish tan or pale reddish tan. The dorsolateral line is creamy white, and the sides are brown. The venter is white. Breeding males have yellow vocal sac.

== Habitat and conservation ==
Dendropsophus robertmertensi inhabit sub-humid and humid lowlands and foothills at elevations up to 700 m (2,300 ft) above sea level. It persists in cutover forests and low scrubby forest, and is not found in primary forest. Breeding takes place in small temporary and permanent ponds. This species is common and or abundant in large parts of its range. Water pollution is only a localized threat. It is present in the El Imposible National Park in El Salvador.
