= Incilius tacanensis =

Conservation status
- Endangered (IUCN 3.1)

Scientific classification
- Kingdom: Animalia
- Phylum: Chordata
- Class: Amphibia
- Order: Anura
- Family: Bufonidae
- Genus: Incilius
- Species: I. tacanensis

Binomial name
- Incilius tacanensis (Smith, 1952)

Synonyms
- Bufo tacanensis Smith, 1952; Cranopsis tacanensis (Smith, 1952)

Species of amphibian

Incilius tacanensis, also known as the Volcan Tacana toad, is a species of toad in the family Bufonidae. It is found in western Guatemala and eastern Chiapas (Mexico). Its name refers to Volcán Tacaná, its type locality. Its natural habitat is premontane tropical forest. It is assumed to be a stream breeder. It is a rare species threatened by habitat loss, and potentially, chytridiomycosis.

== Taxonomy ==
Incilius tacanensis was formally described as Bufo tacanensis by P. W. Smith in 1952 based on a specimen collected from Volcán Tacaná in Chiapas, Mexico. It was subsequently moved to the genus Cranopsis (later renamed Ollotis) in 2006, before being transferred to the current genus Incilius in 2009. It has the common name Volcan Tacana toad.

== Description ==
Preserved individuals have dull brown dorsal coloration with dark brown lateral stripes following the lateral tubercles. There are some cream spots present on legs in some specimens. The ventrum is dark cream with a diffuse dark brown marbled pattern that extends onto the legs. Males generally tend to be more uniform dull brown than the moderately patterned females.

== Distribution and ecology ==
Incilius tacanensis has a small range, being restricted to an area between Cerro Mozotal in Chiapas, Mexico and Zunil Volcano in Quetzaltenango, Guatemala. Even between these points, it has not been recorded from the San Marcos Department of Guatemala. This species may have a larger range than currently known, as it is cryptic and hard to find. The species inhabits leaf litter in moderately high-elevation rainforest and cloud forest, having been recorded at 200–2,200 m (660–7,220 ft).

Eggs were present in the oviducts of females collected in July and August, suggesting that breeding occurs in the wet season. Eggs are small and unpigmented, and are laid in clutches of 50–400 eggs.

== Conservation ==
Incilius tacanensis was classified as being endangered by the IUCN when it was last evaluated for the IUCN Red List in 2019, but a subsequent analysis of its conservation status has suggested that it be uplisted to critically endangered. The species has not been recorded in over 40 years, with the last sighting occurring in Chiapas in 1984. The timing of this last record corresponds closely to the outbreak of chytridiomycosis epidemics in the region. That disease may have been a driving factor in this species' decline and it may already have gone extinct by the mid-1980s.
