= Oedipina elongata =

Conservation status
- Least Concern (IUCN 3.1)

Scientific classification
- Kingdom: Animalia
- Phylum: Chordata
- Class: Amphibia
- Order: Urodela
- Family: Plethodontidae
- Genus: Oedipina
- Species: O. elongata

Binomial name
- Oedipina elongata (Schmidt, 1936)

Species of amphibian

Oedipina elongata is a species of salamander in the family Plethodontidae. It is found in Belize, Guatemala, and Mexico. Its natural habitat is subtropical or tropical moist lowland forests. It is threatened by habitat loss.
