= Bolitoglossa flaviventris =

Conservation status
- Endangered (IUCN 3.1)

Scientific classification
- Kingdom: Animalia
- Phylum: Chordata
- Class: Amphibia
- Order: Urodela
- Family: Plethodontidae
- Genus: Bolitoglossa
- Species: B. flaviventris

Binomial name
- Bolitoglossa flaviventris (Schmidt, 1936)

Species of amphibian

Bolitoglossa flaviventris (Spanish: Salamandra De Panza Amarilla) is a species of salamander in the family Plethodontidae. It is found in Guatemala and Mexico. Its natural habitats are subtropical or tropical moist lowland forests, arable land, plantations, and heavily degraded former forest. It is threatened by habitat loss.
