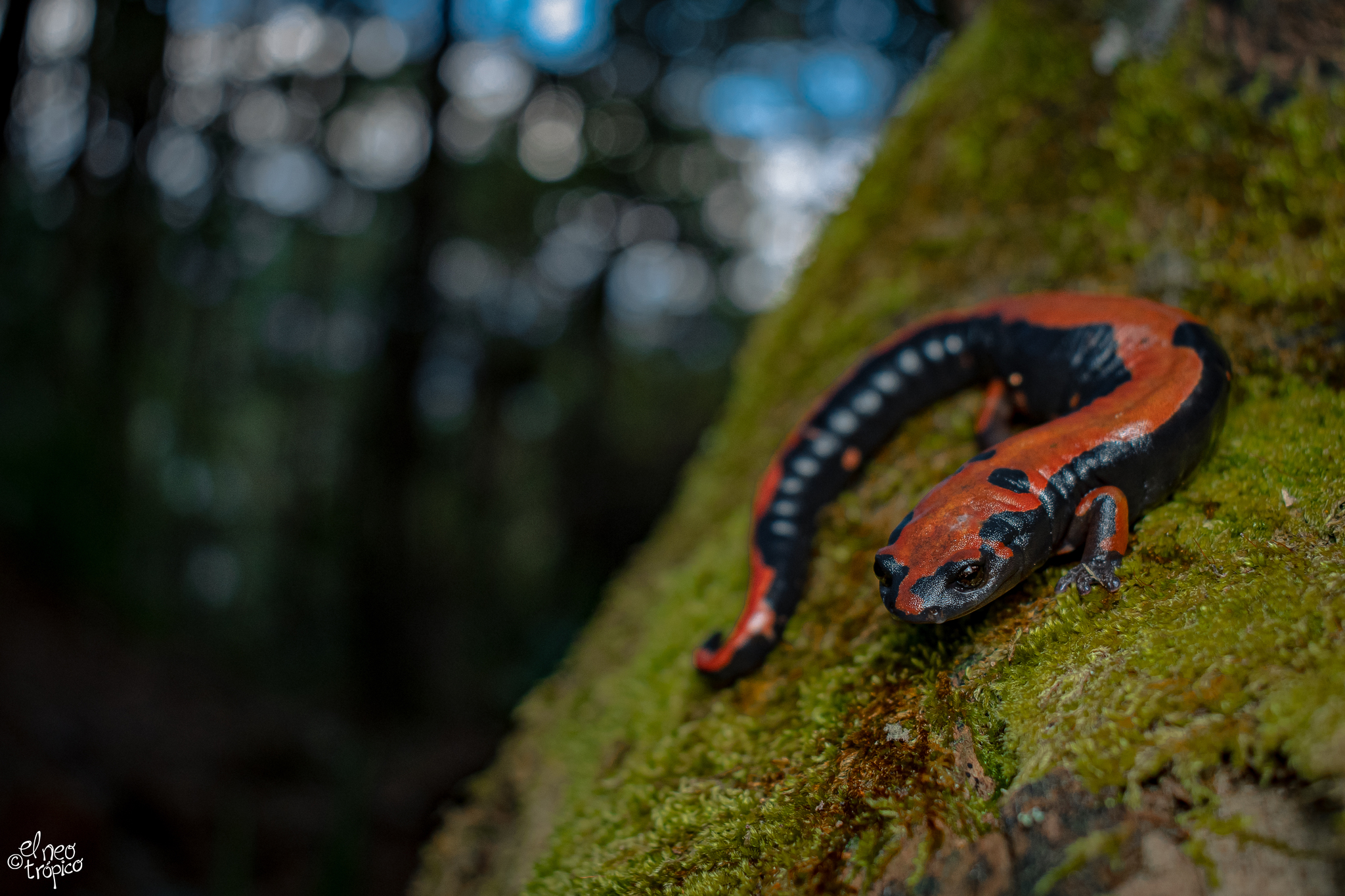

Conservation status
- Near Threatened (IUCN 3.1)

Scientific classification
- Kingdom: Animalia
- Phylum: Chordata
- Class: Amphibia
- Order: Urodela
- Family: Plethodontidae
- Genus: Bolitoglossa
- Species: B. lincolni

Binomial name
- Bolitoglossa lincolni (Stuart, 1943)

Synonyms
- Bolitoglossa resplendens McCoy & Walker, 1966

= Lincoln's climbing salamander =

Species of amphibian

Bolitoglossa lincolni, also known as Lincoln's mushroomtongue salamander or Lincoln's salamander, is a species of salamander in the family Plethodontidae. It is found in Guatemala and Mexico, where it is known from high-elevation forests at elevations of 1,700–3,000 m (5,600–9,800 ft) in several mountain ranges and plateaus. It is classified as being near-threatened by the IUCN due to its highly fragmented distribution and suffers from ongoing habitat degradation

== Taxonomy ==
Bolitoglossa lincolni was formally described in 1943 as Oedipus lincolni based on an adult male specimen collected from Salqnil Grande in Quiché Department, Guatemala. It was transferred to the genus Bolitoglossa in 1963. In 1966, Bolitoglossa specimens collected from Chiapas in Mexico were described as the novel species Bolitoglossa resplendens; this species was later synonymized with B. lincolni in 1984, a taxonomic arrangement that has been maintained by subsequent authorities. The species has the English common names Lincoln's mushroomtongue salamander and Lincoln's salamander.

The species is placed within the subgenus Magnadigita. Bolitoglossa lincolni has been reported to hybridize with B. franklini.

== Distribution and habitat ==
Bolitoglossa lincolni is found in Guatemala and Mexico, from the Guatemalan Plateau and Pacific versants of the Sierra de Cuilco and Sierra de los Cuchumatanes mountain ranges in western Guatemala, north to the plateau of central Chiapas. It inhabits high-elevation forests at elevations of 1,700–3,000 m (5,600–9,800 ft), where it dwells in vegetation. It can tolerate degraded habitat for spans of a few years by relying on undisturbed patches, but eventually disappears from disturbed habitats.

== Conservation ==
Bolitoglossa lincolni is classified as being near-threatened by the IUCN. It has a highly fragmented distribution and suffers from ongoing habitat degradation caused by deforestation, agricultural expansion, grazing, and encroaching human inhabitations. However, it remains common in certain localities and has not suffered large declines like many other Guatemalan salamanders. Salamander chytrid fungus, a pathogen that has devastated European salamander populations post its 2010 introduction to that continent, has not yet spread to the Americas, but still presents a future threat to the species if it ever spreads to Guatemala or Mexico. It occurs in several protected areas, including Huitepec Ecological Reserve and Volcán Tajumulco National Park.
