= Bocourt's tree frog =

Conservation status
- Critically Endangered (IUCN 3.1)

Scientific classification
- Kingdom: Animalia
- Phylum: Chordata
- Class: Amphibia
- Order: Anura
- Family: Hylidae
- Genus: Dryophytes
- Species: D. bocourti

Binomial name
- Dryophytes bocourti (Mocquard, 1899)

Synonyms
- Hyliola bocourti Mocquard, 1899; Hyla bocourti (Mocquard, 1899)

Species of amphibian

Bocourt's tree frog (Dryophytes bocourti), or Bocourt's treefrog, is a species of frog in the family Hylidae. The species is endemic to Guatemala and found on the mountains of southern Alta Verapaz Department and Baja Verapaz Department. It is named after Marie Firmin Bocourt, a French zoologist and artist.

== Habitat ==
Bocourt's tree frog has been found in open, grassy meadows that are flooded during the early part of the rainy season, as well as under sheaths of banana plants and in a bromeliad. It appears to tolerate some habitat disturbance.

== Reproduction ==
Bocourt's treefrog breeds in temporary pools.

== Conservation status ==
The species Dryophytes bocourti seems to have undergone a serious decline. This is attributed to pesticide pollution from the ornamental plant industry and, possibly, to chytridiomycosis.
