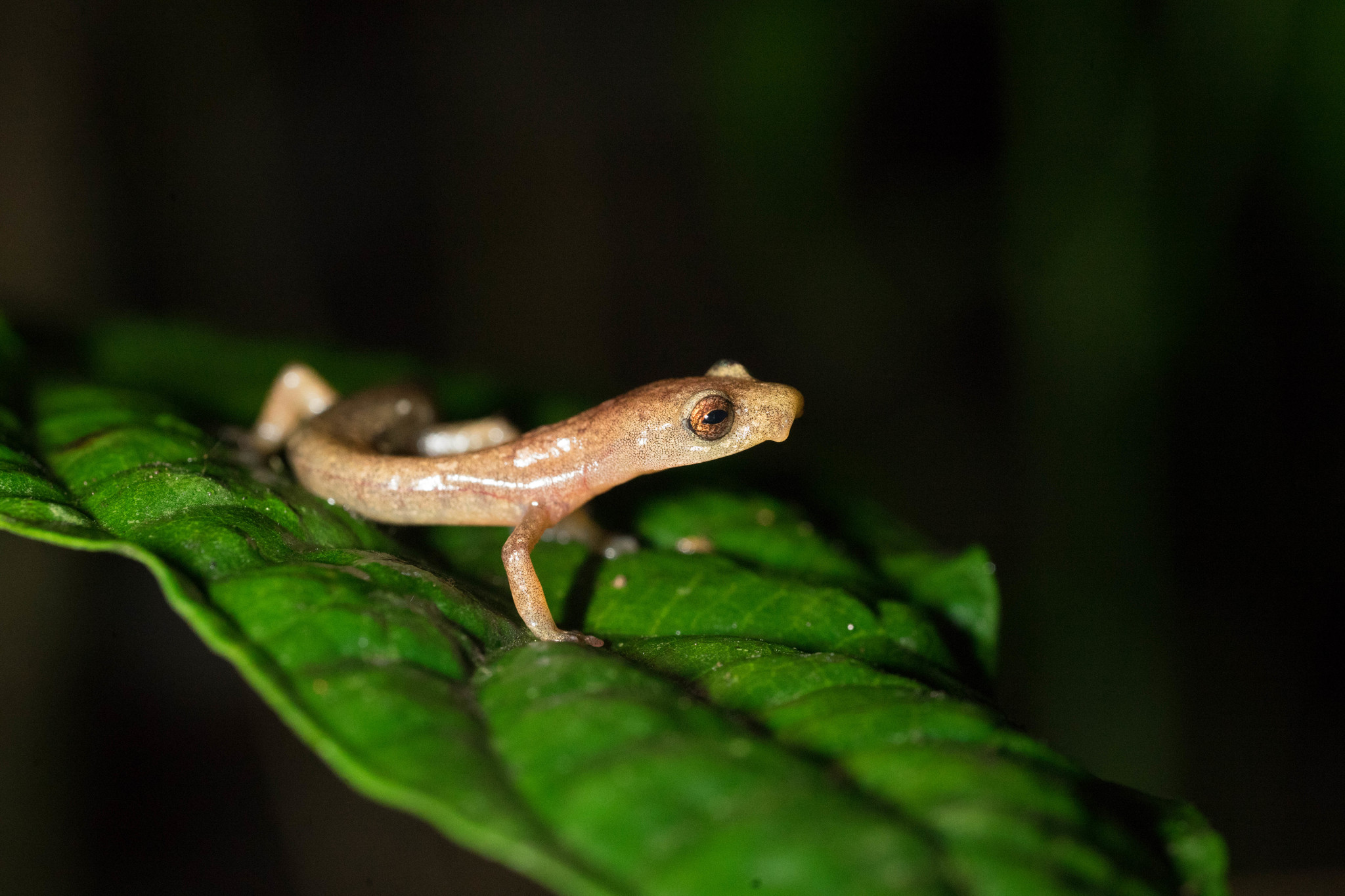

Conservation status
- Endangered (IUCN 3.1)

Scientific classification
- Kingdom: Animalia
- Phylum: Chordata
- Class: Amphibia
- Order: Urodela
- Family: Plethodontidae
- Genus: Bolitoglossa
- Species: B. engelhardti

Binomial name
- Bolitoglossa engelhardti (Schmidt, 1936)

Synonyms
- Oedipus engelhardti Schmidt, 1936; Magnadigita engelhardti (Schmidt, 1936)

= Bolitoglossa engelhardti =

Species of amphibian

Bolitoglossa engelhardti is a species of salamander in the family Plethodontidae. It is found in the extreme south-eastern Chiapas, Mexico, and eastward along the Pacific versant to Volcán Atitlán in south-western Guatemala. It is named for Teodoro Engelhardt, Guatemalan plantation owner who entertained Karl Patterson Schmidt and his expedition. Its common names include Engelhardt's salamander, Engelhardt's mushroomtongue salamander, and Engelhardt's climbing salamander.

== Description ==
Males can grow to 43 mm (1.7 in) and females to 46 mm (1.8 in) in snout–vent length and to 92 and 95 mm (3.6 and 3.7 in) in total length, respectively. The head is large and the eyes are big and protruding. The body has 13 costal grooves. The limbs are well developed; the digits are webbed. The tail is constricted at the base. Coloration is dark grey above, becoming lighter on the flanks. The ventral side is yellow. Some individuals have a banded color pattern, with sharply defined light dorsal area or pair of dorsolateral bands.

A leucistic Bolitoglossa engelhardti has been observed on Volcán Chicabal, representing probably the first leucistic Bolitoglossa on record.

== Habitat and conservation ==
Bolitoglossa engelhardti inhabits pristine cloud forests at elevations of 1,100–2,840 m (3,610–9,320 ft) above sea level. It is an arboreal species often found in bromeliads, rarely on the ground. Breeding is direct (without free-living larvae) and not dependent on water.

This species was formerly common, but appears to have declined and is now uncommon or rare. It is threatened by habitat loss caused by agricultural activities, logging, and human settlements. It is present in the "Quetzal Reserve" in Chiapas and in the proposed protected area of Volcán Atitlán.
