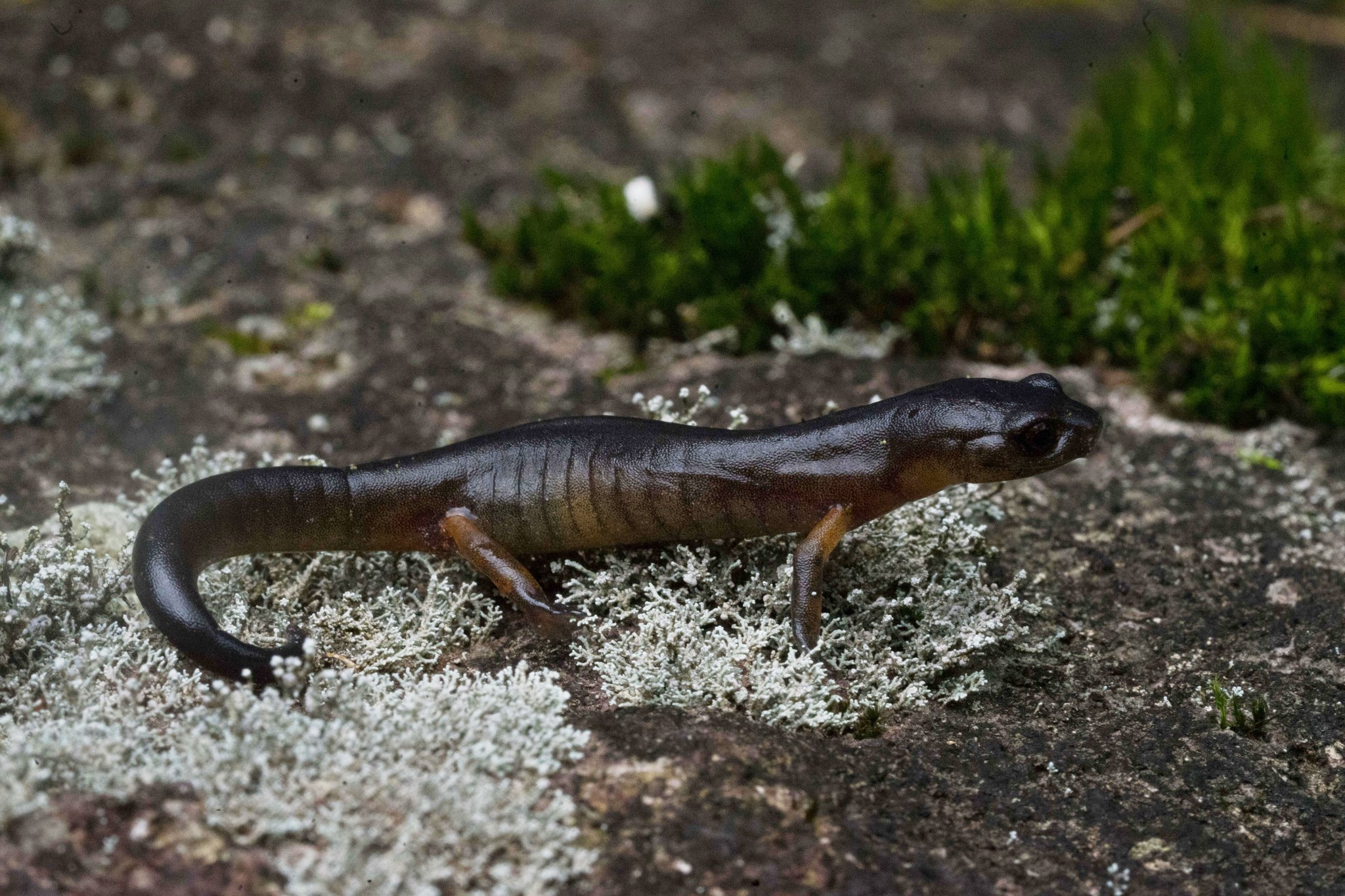

Conservation status
- Endangered (IUCN 3.1)

Scientific classification
- Kingdom: Animalia
- Phylum: Chordata
- Class: Amphibia
- Order: Urodela
- Family: Plethodontidae
- Genus: Bolitoglossa
- Species: B. flavimembris

Binomial name
- Bolitoglossa flavimembris (Schmidt, 1936)

Synonyms
- Magnadigita flavimembris (Schmidt, 1936); Oedipus flavimembris Schmidt, 1936

= Yellow-legged mushroomtongue salamander =

Species of amphibian

The yellow-legged mushroomtongue salamander (Bolitoglossa flavimembris) is a member of salamander family Plethodontidae. It is found in Guatemala and Mexico. Its natural habitat consists of subtropical or tropical moist lowland forests. It is threatened by habitat loss.
