= Dunn's climbing salamander =

Conservation status
- Endangered (IUCN 3.1)

Scientific classification
- Kingdom: Animalia
- Phylum: Chordata
- Class: Amphibia
- Order: Urodela
- Family: Plethodontidae
- Genus: Bolitoglossa
- Species: B. dunni

Binomial name
- Bolitoglossa dunni (K. Schmidt, 1933)

Species of amphibian

Dunn's climbing salamander (Bolitoglossa dunni) is a species of salamander in the family Plethodontidae. It is found in Guatemala and Honduras. Its natural habitat is subtropical or tropical moist montane forests. It is threatened by habitat loss.
