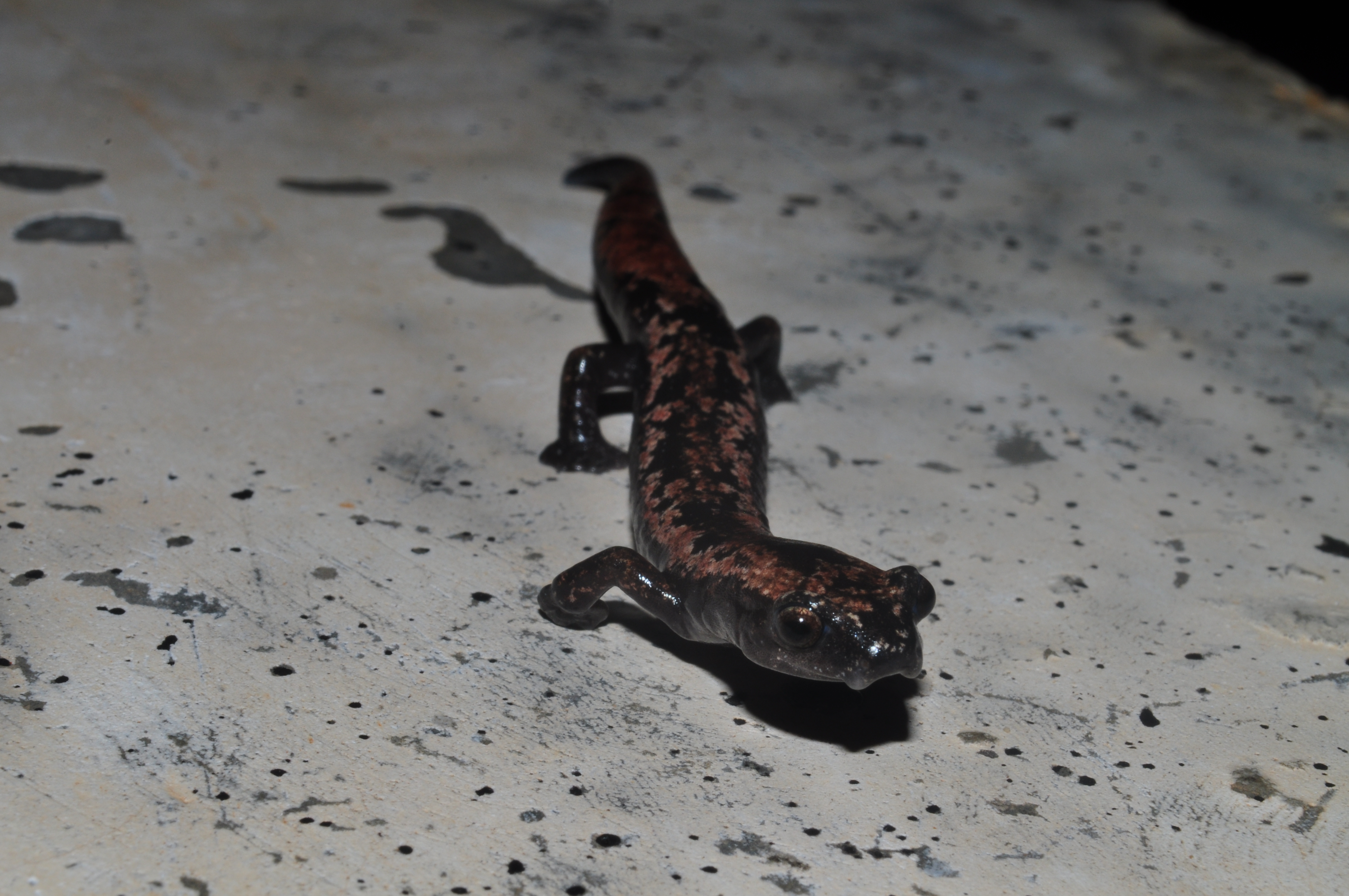

Conservation status
- Least Concern (IUCN 3.1)

Scientific classification
- Kingdom: Animalia
- Phylum: Chordata
- Class: Amphibia
- Order: Urodela
- Family: Plethodontidae
- Genus: Bolitoglossa
- Species: B. yucatana

Binomial name
- Bolitoglossa yucatana (Peters, 1882)

Synonyms
- Spelerpus (Oedipus) yucatanus Peters, 1882; Spelerpes yucatanicus Boulenger, 1882

= Yucatán mushroomtongue salamander =

Species of amphibian

The Yucatán mushroomtongue salamander (Bolitoglossa yucatana), also known as the Yucatán salamander, is a species of salamander in the family Plethodontidae. It is found in the Yucatan Peninsula of Mexico and extreme northern Belize, possibly reaching into Guatemala.

Its natural habitats are lowland tropical forest and thorn forest below 150 m (490 ft) above sea level. It also occurs in disturbed habitat around villages. It is mainly terrestrial, living on the forest floor under surface debris, and in sink holes. However, it can also live in arboreal bromeliads. It is threatened by habitat loss. It occurs in the Calakmul Biosphere Reserve in Mexico and in the Shipstern Conservation & Management Area and Fireburn Nature Reserve in Belize.
