= Pseudoeurycea goebeli =

Conservation status
- Critically Endangered (IUCN 3.1)

Scientific classification
- Kingdom: Animalia
- Phylum: Chordata
- Class: Amphibia
- Order: Urodela
- Family: Plethodontidae
- Genus: Pseudoeurycea
- Species: P. goebeli

Binomial name
- Pseudoeurycea goebeli (Schmidt, 1936)

Species of amphibian

Pseudoeurycea goebeli is a species of salamander in the family Plethodontidae. It is found in Guatemala and Mexico. Its natural habitat is subtropical or tropical moist montane forests. These salamanders live at an elevation of 2400–2900 meters in the cloud forest. Researchers have found that their mating and spermiogenesis do not depend on temporal changes like other salamanders in that area. Another unique fact about these specific salamanders is that even though they have mating opportunities throughout the year and they are active all year, they are seasonal egg-layers. It is threatened by habitat loss.
