= O'Donnell's salamander =

Conservation status
- Near Threatened (IUCN 3.1)

Scientific classification
- Kingdom: Animalia
- Phylum: Chordata
- Class: Amphibia
- Order: Urodela
- Family: Plethodontidae
- Genus: Bolitoglossa
- Species: B. odonnelli

Binomial name
- Bolitoglossa odonnelli (Stuart, 1943)

Species of amphibian

O'Donnell's salamander (Bolitoglossa odonnelli) is a species of salamander in the family Plethodontidae. It is found in Guatemala and Honduras. Its natural habitats are subtropical or tropical moist lowland forests, subtropical or tropical moist montane forests, plantations, rural gardens, and heavily degraded former forest. It is threatened by habitat loss.
