= Nyctanolis =

Conservation status
- Vulnerable (IUCN 3.1)

Scientific classification
- Kingdom: Animalia
- Phylum: Chordata
- Class: Amphibia
- Order: Urodela
- Family: Plethodontidae
- Subfamily: Hemidactyliinae
- Genus: Nyctanolis; Elias & Wake, 1983
- Species: N. pernix

Binomial name
- Nyctanolis pernix Elias & Wake, 1983

Genus of salamanders

Nyctanolis is a monotypic genus of salamanders in the family Plethodontidae. It is represented by the species Nyctanolis pernix, also commonly referred to as nimble long-limbed salamander, which is characterized by its absence of lungs; it instead achieves respiration through its skin and the tissues lining the mouth. It is found in Guatemala and Mexico. Its natural habitat is subtropical or tropical moist montane forests. It is threatened by habitat loss.
