= Bradytriton =

Conservation status
- Endangered (IUCN 3.1)

Scientific classification
- Kingdom: Animalia
- Phylum: Chordata
- Class: Amphibia
- Order: Urodela
- Family: Plethodontidae
- Subfamily: Hemidactyliinae
- Genus: Bradytriton; Wake and Elias, 1983
- Species: B. silus

Binomial name
- Bradytriton silus Wake and Elias, 1983

Genus of salamanders

Bradytriton is a monotypic genus of salamanders in the family Plethodontidae. it is represented by the species Bradytriton silus, commonly known as the Finca Chiblac salamander, and has been considered the sister taxon of the genus Oedipina. It is found in north-western Guatemala and in Chiapas, south-eastern Mexico.

== Description ==
Adult males measure 39–53 mm (1.5–2.1 in) and adult females 49–53 mm (1.9–2.1 in) in snout–vent length. The body is stocky. The head is relatively broad and essentially continuous with the body. The tail is short and laterally compressed, appearing stout when viewed from the side. The limbs are short and slender with diminutive digits that are, apart from their tips, fused together. Dorsal coloration is reddish brown. The head is mostly black and there are black flecks on the anterior part of the body. The cheeks, sides of the tail, and lower flanks are black with dense white flecks.

== Habitat and conservation ==
In north-western Guatemala, Bradytriton silus is known from both disturbed and undisturbed wet forest at an elevation of about 1,310 m (4,300 ft) above sea level. Specimens were found under pieces of wood and logs. Development is presumably direct (i.e., no free-living larval stage) and not dependent on water.

The area of the type locality is subject to severe habitat loss caused by the settlement of refugees and expanding agriculture; the species has not been recorded there after 1976, despite later searches. However, another population was reported from Chiapas, Mexico in 2015.
