= List of amphibians of El Salvador =

This is a list of amphibians found in El Salvador. 29 amphibian species have been registered in El Salvador, which are grouped in 2 orders: salamanders (Caudata) and frogs and toads (Anura). No caecilian (Gymnophiona) species have been registered. This list is derived from the database listing of AmphibiaWeb.

== Salamanders (Caudata) ==
=== Plethodontidae ===
Order: Caudata. Family: Plethodontidae

- Bolitoglossa heiroreias (EN)
- Bolitoglossa salvinii (EN)
- Bolitoglossa synoria (CR)
- Oedipina taylori (LC)

== Toads and frogs (Anura) ==
=== Bufonidae ===
Order: Anura. Family: Bufonidae

- Incilius canaliferus (LC)
- Incilius coccifer (LC)
- Incilius luetkenii (LC)
- Rhinella marina (LC)

=== Centrolenidae ===
Order: Anura. Family: Centrolenidae

- Hyalinobatrachium fleischmanni (LC)

=== Craugastoridae ===
Order: Anura. Family: Craugastoridae

- Craugastor rhodopis (VU)

=== Dermophiidae ===
Order: Anura. Family: Dermophiidae

- Dermophis mexicanus (VU)

=== Hylidae ===
Order: Anura. Family: Hylidae

- Agalychnis moreletii (CR)
- Dendropsophus robertmertensi (LC)
- Exerodonta catracha (EN)
- Plectrohyla glandulosa (EN)
- Plectrohyla guatemalensis (CR)
- Plectrohyla psiloderma (EN)
- Plectrohyla sagorum (EN)
- Ptychohyla euthysanota (NT)
- Ptychohyla salvadorensis (EN)
- Scinax staufferi (LC)
- Smilisca baudinii (LC)

=== Leptodactylidae ===
Order: Anura. Family: Leptodactylidae

- Engystomops pustulosus (LC)
- Leptodactylus fragilis (LC)
- Leptodactylus melanonotus (LC)

=== Microhylidae ===
Order: Anura. Family: Microhylidae

- Gastrophryne usta (LC)
- Hypopachus barberi (VU)

=== Ranidae ===
Order: Anura. Family: Ranidae

- Rana maculata (LC)

=== Rhinophrynidae ===
Order: Anura. Family: Rhinophrynidae

- Rhinophrynus dorsalis (LC)
