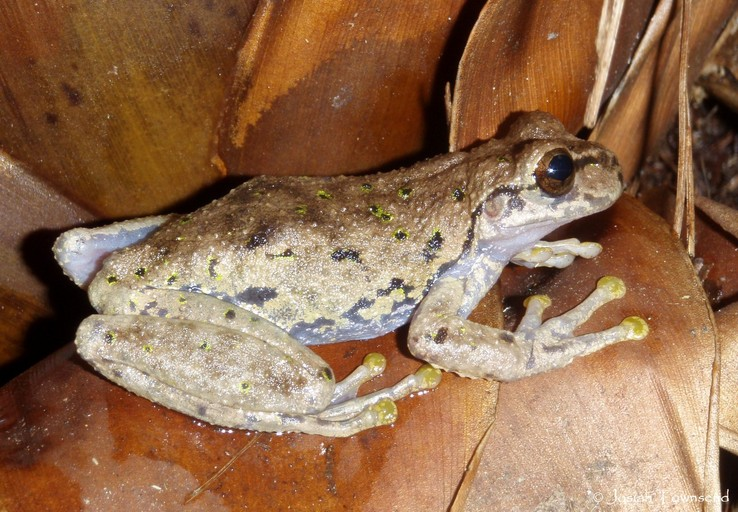

Conservation status
- Critically Endangered (IUCN 3.1)

Scientific classification
- Kingdom: Animalia
- Phylum: Chordata
- Class: Amphibia
- Order: Anura
- Family: Hylidae
- Genus: Plectrohyla
- Species: P. dasypus

Binomial name
- Plectrohyla dasypus McCranie & Wilson, 1981

Synonyms
- Hyla dasypus (McCranie & Wilson, 1981)

= Plectrohyla dasypus =

Species of amphibian

Plectrohyla dasypus, the Honduras spikethumb frog, is a species of frog in the family Hylidae. It is endemic to northwestern Honduras.

== Taxonomy ==
Plectrohyla dasypus was first formally described in 1981 by the American herpetologists James R. McCranie and Larry David Wilson with its type locality given as along the Quebrada Cusuco at El Cusuco, 15°30'N, 88°, 13'W 5.6 km (3.5 mi) at an elevation of 1,580 m (5,180 ft), west south west of Buenos Aires, which is 19 km (12 mi) north of Cofradía in the Sierra de Omoa, Cortés, Honduras. This species was placed within the P. guatemalensis species group within the genus Plectrohyla, following the inclusion of the Hyla bistincta species group in that genus. Subsequent work has moved the Hyla bistincta group into a separate genus, Sarcohyla. The genus Plectrohyla is included in the subfamily Hylinae of the "tree frog" family Hylidae within the frog and toad order Anura.

== Etymology ==
Plectrohyla dasypus belongs to the genus Plectrohyla which combines the Greek plēktron, meaning "spur" with the genus name Hyla, the type genus of the family Hylidae. The specific name, dasypus, is the genus name of the Nine-banded armadillo (Dasypus novemcinctus) and is a reference to the type locality, El Cusuco, cusuco being a local name for the nine-banded armadillo.

== Description ==
Plectrohyla dasypus can be told apart from other Plectrohyla tree frogs by its small size, with a snout to vent length of 31.5 to 44 mm (1.24 to 1.73 in). It also typically has a smooth back, although some small tubercles may be present, it has vocal slits and there is no vertical keel on the snout. The males' prepollical spine, the spine on the hand is short, flat and blunt. The back is bronze and the underside is grey, with no darke lines or spots.

== Distribution and habitat ==
Plectrohyla dasypus is endemic to the Cusuco National Park in the Cortés Department of Honduras at elevations between 1,410 and 1,990 m (4,630 and 6,530 ft) above sea level. Its natural habitats are lower montane wet forests. They are found on low vegetation along streams and in arboreal bromeliads, and breed in streams.

== Conservation ==
Plectrohyla dasypus was once moderately common, the species has undergone a dramatic decline that is attributed to chytridiomycosis and it is now classified as Critically Endangered by the International Union for Conservation of Nature.
