= Sarcohyla cyanomma =

Conservation status
- Critically Endangered (IUCN 3.1)

Scientific classification
- Kingdom: Animalia
- Phylum: Chordata
- Class: Amphibia
- Order: Anura
- Family: Hylidae
- Genus: Sarcohyla
- Species: S. cyanomma

Binomial name
- Sarcohyla cyanomma (Caldwell, 1974)

Synonyms
- Hyla cyanomma Caldwell, 1974; Plectrohyla cyanomma (Caldwell, 1974)

Species of frog

Sarcohyla cyanomma, also known as the blue-eyed aquatic treefrog, is a species of frog in the family Hylidae. It is endemic to Mexico and only known from the northern slope of Cerro Pelón, in Sierra de Juárez in northern Oaxaca. It is feared that the species might be extinct.

== Etymology ==
The specific name cyanomma is derived from the Greek words kyanos ("blue") and omma ("eye") and refers to the blue eyes of this species.

== Description ==
Sarcohyla cyanomma is a large, robust frog. Adult males measure 52–56 mm (2.0–2.2 in) and females 52–65 mm (2.0–2.6 in) in snout–vent length. The tympanum is partly or completely concealed. The fingers have vestigial webbing whereas the toes are moderately webbed. The dorsum is uniform olive-green with few tiny, bright yellow spots; the olive-green fades to pale blue around vent and along outer edge of forearm and tarsus. The venter and chin are greenish-yellow, as are the outer toes and fingers. The ventral surfaces of limbs to the inner toes and fingers bright are yellow-orange. The iris is pale bluish-gray. Males have enlarged non-projecting prepollex (the "spikethumb") but not nuptial excrescences.

== Habitat and conservation ==
The natural habitats of this species are pristine cloud forest with low or moderate streams, its probably breeding habitat. It is known from elevations between 2,640 and 2,670 m (8,660 and 8,760 ft) above sea level. At night, these frogs were found submerged on the bottom of large pools or at the edges of pools, with only their heads above water, and escaping to deeper water if disturbed. By day, they occurred near the same pools but mostly sitting on rocks several centimeters above the water. The only other anuran in the habitat was what at the time was identified as Plectrohyla siopela, but later described as a new species, Plectrohyla celata.

Sarcohyla cyanomma was once relatively common and conspicuous in its habitat. However, it was last collected in 1980, and is possibly now extinct. The stream at the type locality is still in good condition, so the decline might be caused by chytridiomycosis. Habitat loss is occurring elsewhere in the area and could have contributed to the overall decline of this species.
