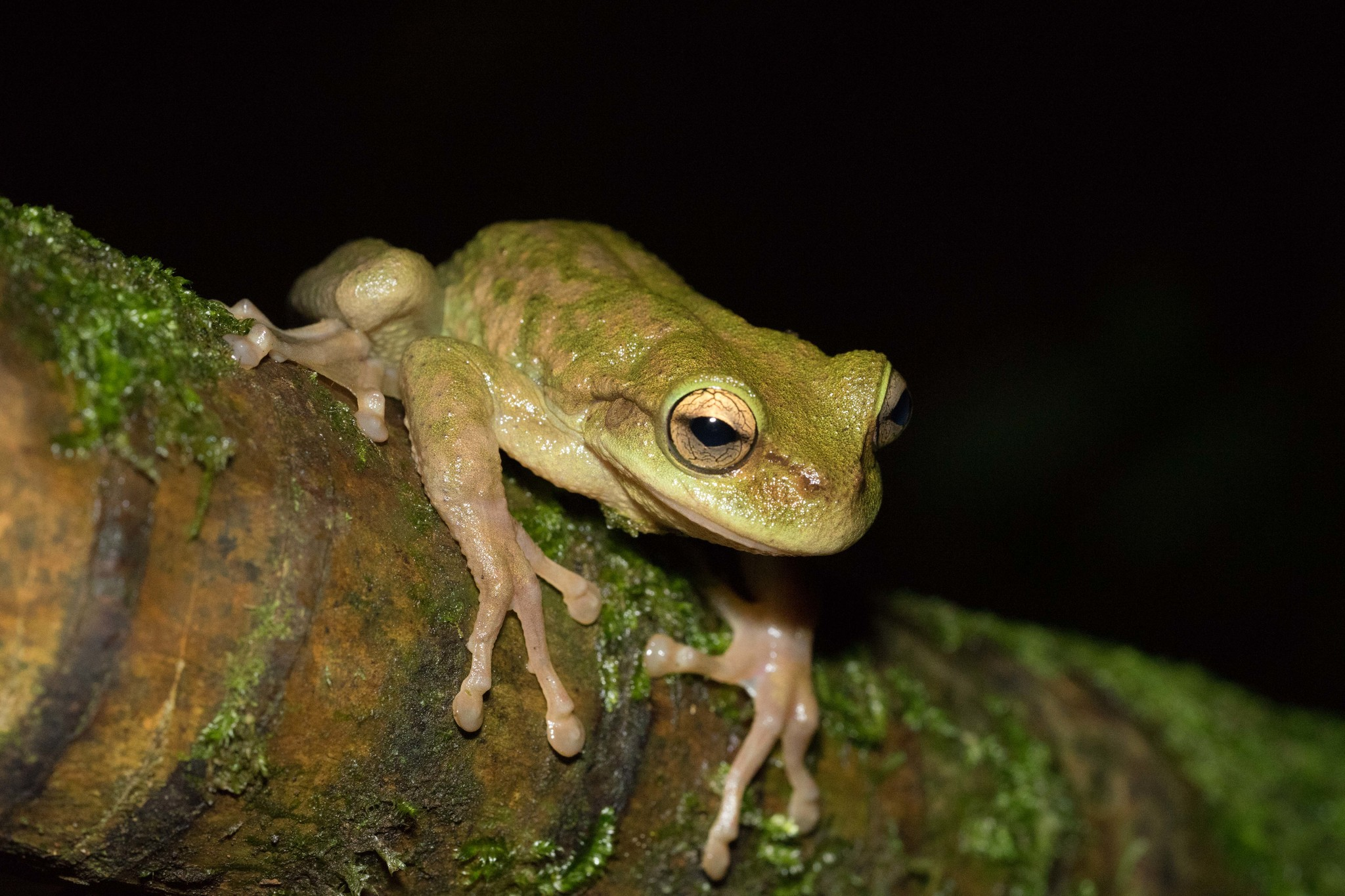

Conservation status
- Endangered (IUCN 3.1)

Scientific classification
- Kingdom: Animalia
- Phylum: Chordata
- Class: Amphibia
- Order: Anura
- Family: Hylidae
- Genus: Plectrohyla
- Species: P. hartwegi

Binomial name
- Plectrohyla hartwegi Duellman, 1968

= Plectrohyla hartwegi =

Species of frog

Plectrohyla hartwegi (common name: Hartweg's spikethumb frog) is a species of frog in the family Hylidae. It is found in the Sierra Madre de Chiapas and eastern Oaxaca in Mexico, Sierra de los Cuchumatanes in western Guatemala as well as Sierra de las Minas in eastern Guatemala, and Sierra de Omoa in southwestern Honduras. It might be a composite of two or more species.

== Etymology and history ==
This species is named after Norman Hartweg, American herpetologist. The holotype, collected by Eizi Matuda in 1941, was sent to Hartweg, who recognized it as unique but did not want to describe a new species based on just one specimen. The species was eventually described in 1968 by William E. Duellman, after further specimens had become available.

== Description ==
The type series consisted of three specimens, an adult male (holotype) measuring 64 mm (2.5 in) in snout–vent length (SVL), and two subadult males measuring 42 and 48 mm (1.7 and 1.9 in) SVL. Based on further specimens, adult males reach 76 mm (3.0 in) SVL and females 77 mm (3.0 in) SVL. The body is robust. The head is slightly wider than long and as wide as the body; the snout is short. The eyes are large. The heavy supra-tympanic fold covers the upper edge of the tympanum. The dorsal coloration varies is dull olive-brown, olive-green, or pale green. About one fifth of individuals have irregular pale bronze-tan spots on the dorsum and the limbs. The prepollex (the "spikethumb") in males is massive and bifid.

== Habitat and conservation ==
Its natural habitats are high-elevation (925–2,700 m (3,035–8,858 ft) above sea level) cloud forests near rocky mountain streams, its breeding habitat. It has disappeared from some locations and appears to be on decline. The reasons are probably chytridiomycosis as well as habitat loss. The Mexican law protects it under the "Special Protection" category.
