= Eupatoriastrum =

Scientific classification
- Kingdom: Plantae
- Clade: Tracheophytes
- Clade: Angiosperms
- Clade: Eudicots
- Clade: Asterids
- Order: Asterales
- Family: Asteraceae
- Subfamily: Asteroideae
- Tribe: Eupatorieae
- Subtribe: Critoniinae
- Genus: Eupatoriastrum; Greenm.

Synonyms
- Matudina R.M.King & H.Rob.

Genus of flowering plants

Eupatoriastrum is a genus of flowering plants in the family Asteraceae. It is native to Mexico and Central America (and found in Costa Rica, El Salvador, Guatemala, Honduras, and Nicaragua).

The genus is named for Mithridates Eupator, king of Pontus.

The genus has been verified by the United States Department of Agriculture and the Agricultural Research Service, but it does not list any species.

== Species ==
As accepted by Plants of the World Online;

- Eupatoriastrum angulifolium (B.L.Rob.) R.M.King & H.Rob.
- Eupatoriastrum chlorostylum B.L.Turner
- Eupatoriastrum corvi (McVaugh) B.L.Turner
- Eupatoriastrum johnbeamanii B.L.Turner
- Eupatoriastrum nelsonii Greenm.
- Eupatoriastrum pochutlanum B.L.Turner
- Eupatoriastrum triangulare B.L.Rob.

== Other sources ==
- Turner, B. L. 1994. Systematic study of the genus Eupatoriastrum (Asteraceae, Eupatorieae). Pl. Syst. Evol. 190:113-127.
