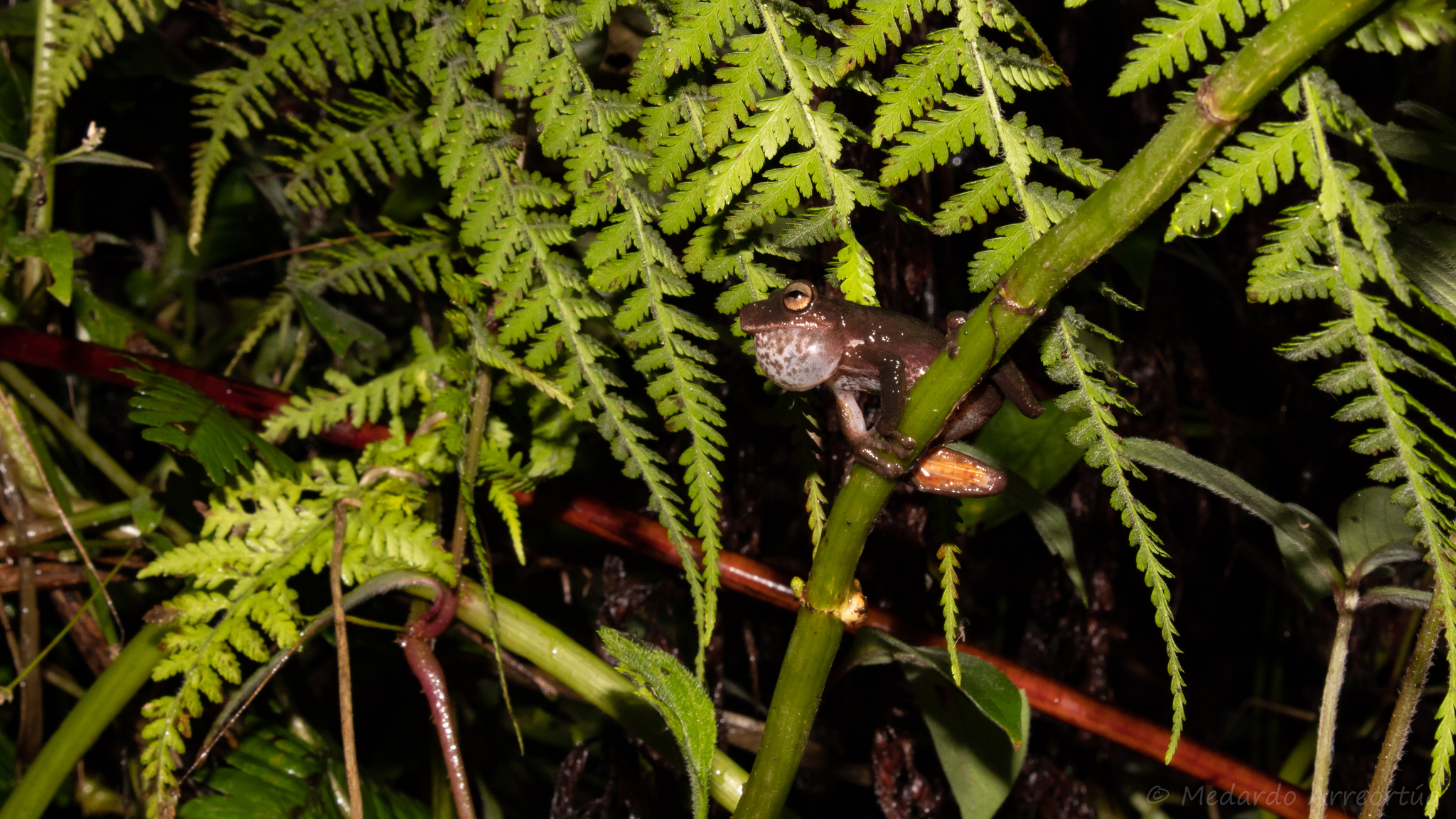

Conservation status
- Vulnerable (IUCN 3.1)

Scientific classification
- Kingdom: Animalia
- Phylum: Chordata
- Class: Amphibia
- Order: Anura
- Family: Hylidae
- Genus: Ptychohyla
- Species: P. zophodes

Binomial name
- Ptychohyla zophodes Campbell and Duellman, 2000

Synonyms
- Hyla zophodes (Campbell and Duellman, 2000)

= Ptychohyla zophodes =

Species of amphibian

Ptychohyla zophodes is a species of frogs in the family Hylidae. It is endemic to Mexico and known from the Atlantic slopes of the Sierra Madre de Oaxaca in northern Oaxaca and adjacent central-western Veracruz. Before being described as a new species in 2000, it was mixed with Ptychohyla leonhardschultzei. The specific name zophodes is a Greek word meaning "dusky" or "gloomy" and refers to the distinctive dark coloration of the species as well as its cloud forest habitat. Common name gloomy mountain stream frog has been coined for it.

== Description ==
Adult males in the type series measure 35–37 mm (1.4–1.5 in) and adult females 42–44 mm (1.7–1.7 in) in snout–vent length. The snout is rounded in dorsal view and truncate in profile. The supratympanic fold is well developed and covers the upper edge of the tympanum. The forelimbs are moderately robust; the fingers are moderately long, have large discs, and are about one-third webbed. The hind limbs are moderately long and slender. The toe discs are only slightly smaller than those on the fingers; the toes are about three-fourths webbed. The dorsal ground color is deep brown, grading into purplish brown on the sides. There is irregular black mottling and two irregular black transverse bars on the shanks; these markings are not conspicuous in all specimens. Females are slightly paler than males.

The male advertisement call is a deep "wraack".

The largest tadpoles (Gosner stage 40) measure 14.5 mm (0.57 in) in body length and 44.2 mm (1.74 in) in total length.

== Habitat and conservation ==
Ptychohyla zophodes occurs in cloud forests and lower montane rainforests at elevations of 400–1,500 m (1,300–4,900 ft) above sea level. It typically occurs in vegetation close to streams. The tadpoles develop in streams. Adults are mostly seen at night. The species is threatened by habitat loss from small-scale farming and wood extraction and by chytridiomycosis.
