= Sarcohyla toyota =

Conservation status
- Critically Endangered (IUCN 3.1)

Scientific classification
- Kingdom: Animalia
- Phylum: Chordata
- Class: Amphibia
- Order: Anura
- Family: Hylidae
- Genus: Sarcohyla
- Species: S. toyota

Binomial name
- Sarcohyla toyota Grünwald, Franz-Chávez, Morales-Flores, Ahumada-Carrillo, and Jones, 2019

Species of amphibian

Sarcohyla toyota, or Toyota's tree frog is a frog in the family Hylidae, endemic to Mexico. Scientists have seen it in cloud forests in the Sierra Madre del Sur mountains between 1975 and 2185 meters above sea level.

Scientists place this frog in the same species group as Sarcohyla thorectes.

== Original description ==
- Christoph I Grünwald; Hector Franz-Chávez; Karen I Morales-Flores; Ivan T Ahumada-Carrillo; Jason M Jones (December 20, 2019). "A rare new treefrog of the genus Sarcohyla (Anura: Hylidae) from Guerrero, Mexico". Zootaxa (Abstract). 4712 (3): 345–364. doi:10.11646/zootaxa.4712.3.2. PMID 32230674. S2CID 213371720.
