= Sarcohyla cembra =

Conservation status
- Endangered (IUCN 3.1)

Scientific classification
- Kingdom: Animalia
- Phylum: Chordata
- Class: Amphibia
- Order: Anura
- Family: Hylidae
- Genus: Sarcohyla
- Species: S. cembra

Binomial name
- Sarcohyla cembra (Caldwell, 1974)

Synonyms
- Hyla cembra Caldwell, 1974; Plectrohyla cembra (Caldwell, 1974)

Species of frog

Sarcohyla cembra, also known as the Southern Sierra Madre treefrog, is a species of frog in the family Hylidae. It is endemic to Mexico. Until recently, it was only known from two male specimens: one from its type locality on the Pacific slopes of the Sierra Madre del Sur mountains, Pochutla District, Oaxaca, and another one from Sierra de Yucuyacua south-east of Llano de Guadalupe, in north-west Oaxaca. The two locations are about 172 km (107 mi) apart. After having not been seen after 1993, it was feared that the species might be extinct. However, the species was rediscovered in field surveys in 2011–2012, extending its range with a new locality about 10 km north of the type locality.

== Etymology ==
The specific name cembra is Latin for "timber" and refers to the pine-oak forest this species inhabits.

== Taxonomy ==
It was initially thought that the female specimen that became the holotype of Sarcohyla miahuatlanensis could be a female Sarcohyla cembra, but it was eventually identified as a new, distinct species. Nevertheless, the two species are morphologically similar.

== Description ==
The holotype is a male that measures 37 or 36.1 mm (1.46 or 1.42 in) in snout–vent length, depending on the source. The second specimen, also a male, measures 40.4 mm (1.59 in) SVL. The body is moderately robust. The tympanum is small and indistinct. Skin is smooth on the dorsum and limbs, weakly granular on venter, chin, and ventral surfaces of thighs. The fingers are without webbing whereas the toes are moderately webbed. The dorsum was bright greenish yellow upon capture, changing to dull green. There is brown and green reticulations along sides. The throat and chest are white. The ventral sides of limbs and belly are pinkish tan. The iris is brownish yellow.

Male advertisement call is a short "wrack", often followed by a series of low "chuckles". Tadpoles found at the type locality, provisionally allocated to this species, measured up to 51 mm (2.0 in) in total length.

== Habitat and conservation ==
The natural habitats of this species are pine-oak forest. The holotype was found calling at night from under a piece of bark on a large log in a small stream at 2,160 m (7,090 ft) above sea level. The second specimen was found inside an arboreal bromeliad on a fallen oak tree at 2,850 m (9,350 ft) asl.

This species was only known from two specimens collected in 1969 and 1993, until it was again found in 2011–2012. Its habitat, the pine-oak forests, are under threat caused by logging and agriculture. Also chytridiomycosis might have impacted the species.
