= Sarcohyla miahuatlanensis =

Conservation status
- Data Deficient (IUCN 3.1)

Scientific classification
- Kingdom: Animalia
- Phylum: Chordata
- Class: Amphibia
- Order: Anura
- Family: Hylidae
- Genus: Sarcohyla
- Species: S. miahuatlanensis

Binomial name
- Sarcohyla miahuatlanensis (Meik, Smith, Canseco-Márquez, and Campbell, 2006)
- Sarcohyla miahuatlanensis is only known from near Candelaria Loxicha on the Sierra de Miahuatlán, Mexico

Synonyms
- Plectrohyla miahuatlanensis Meik, Smith, Canseco-Márquez, and Campbell, 2006

Species of amphibian

Sarcohyla miahuatlanensis, or the Sierra Miahuatlan spikethumb frog, is a species of frog in the family Hylidae. It is endemic to Mexico and only known from its type locality near Candelaria Loxicha on the Sierra de Miahuatlán (part of Sierra Madre del Sur) in Oaxaca.

== Taxonomy ==
It is similar to Sarcohyla cembra and Sarcohyla sabrina.

== Description ==
The holotype, and the only known specimen, is a female that measured 42.5 mm (1.67 in) in snout–vent length. The coloration is distinctive: the dorsum is dark green, hidden surfaces are dark brown, flanks are yellow flanks, and canthal mask and lateral reticulations are dark brown. There is a yellow stripe that separates the dorsal from the ventral coloration on the limbs and above the cloaca. The fingers and toes are long and have large ovoid discs; webbing between the fingers is vestigial and slightly more developed between the toes.

== Habitat and conservation ==
The species' habitat is mesic pine-oak forest; a single female frog was found in late afternoon, inactive between the leaves of an arboreal bromeliad at 2,550 m (8,370 ft) above sea level. Other amphibians found at the locality were salamanders Craugastor mexicanus and Bolitoglossa oaxacensis and frogs of the Exerodonta sumichrasti group.

The area of type locality was covered with relatively intact forest at the time the holotype was collected in 2001. However, many slopes of the Sierra de Miahuatlan have been at least partially cleared for agriculture.
