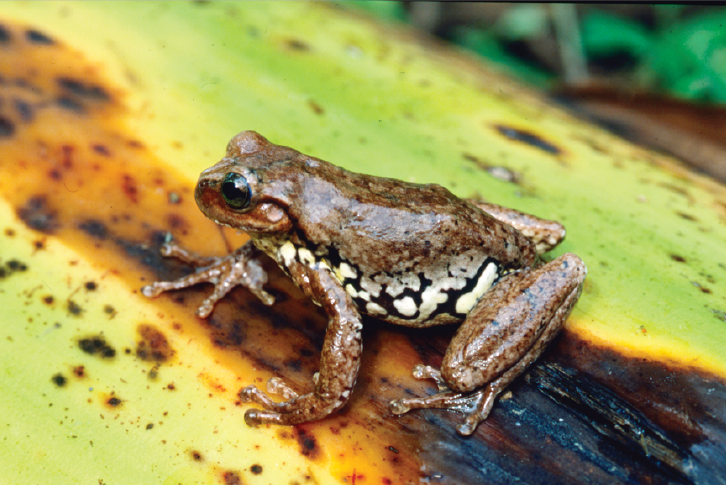
- Sarcohyla hapsa

Scientific classification
- Kingdom: Animalia
- Phylum: Chordata
- Class: Amphibia
- Order: Anura
- Family: Hylidae
- Subfamily: Hylinae
- Genus: Sarcohyla; Duellman, Marion, and Hedges, 2016

Type species
- Cauphias crassus Brocchi, 1877

Species
- 26 species (see text)

= Sarcohyla =

Genus of amphibians

Sarcohyla is a genus of frogs in the family Hylidae. It is endemic to Mexico and is found in the montane parts of the country between Durango in the north and Guerrero in the south. These frogs typically occur in pristine habitats along streams in pine–oak woodland at elevations between 1,500 and 3,100 m (4,900 and 10,200 ft) above sea level. The generic name is derived from the Greek sarkodes meaning "fleshy" in combination with Hylas and refers to the thick, glandular skin characteristic of most of the species in the genus.

== Description ==
Sarcohyla are moderate to large-sized frogs. They have thick, glandular skin. Osteological characteristics include enlarged prepollex without a projecting spine and the alary process of the premaxilla that is not bifurcate posteriorly.

== Taxonomy ==
Sarcohyla was erected in 2016 based on molecular data. It contains species that were allocated to "Hyla bistincta" and "Hyla arborescandens groups" by Duellman in 2001 and to "Plectrohyla bistincta group" in some later works. Its sister group is Plectrohyla. Not all species of the genus were included in the molecular analysis, and there is some concern that the omitted species could challenge monophyly of the genus.

== Species ==
The genus contains 26 species:

- Sarcohyla ameibothalame (Canseco-Márquez, Mendelson, and Gutiérrez-Mayén, 2002)
- Sarcohyla arborescandens (Taylor, 1939)
- Sarcohyla bistincta (Cope, 1877)
- Sarcohyla calvicollina (Toal, 1994)
- Sarcohyla celata (Toal and Mendelson, 1995)
- Sarcohyla cembra (Caldwell, 1974)
- Sarcohyla charadricola (Duellman, 1964)
- Sarcohyla chryses (Adler, 1965)
- Sarcohyla crassa (Brocchi, 1877)
- Sarcohyla cyanomma (Caldwell, 1974)
- Sarcohyla cyclada (Campbell and Duellman, 2000)
- Sarcohyla floresi Kaplan, Heimes, and Aguilar, 2020
- Sarcohyla hapsa Campbell, Brodie, Caviedes-Solis, Nieto-Montes de Oca, Luja, Flores-Villela, García-Vázquez, Sarker, and Wostl, 2018
- Sarcohyla hazelae (Taylor, 1940)
- Sarcohyla labeculata (Shannon, 1951)
- Sarcohyla labedactyla (Mendelson and Toal, 1996)
- Sarcohyla miahuatlanensis (Meik, Smith, Canseco-Márquez, and Campbell, 2006)
- Sarcohyla mykter (Adler and Dennis, 1972)
- Sarcohyla pachyderma (Taylor, 1942)
- Sarcohyla pentheter (Adler, 1965)
- Sarcohyla psarosema (Campbell and Duellman, 2000)
- Sarcohyla robertsorum (Taylor, 1940)
- Sarcohyla sabrina (Caldwell, 1974)
- Sarcohyla siopela (Duellman, 1968)
- Sarcohyla thorectes (Adler, 1965)
- Sarcohyla toyota Grünwald, Franz-Chávez, Morales-Flores, Ahumada-Carrillo, and Jones, 2019
