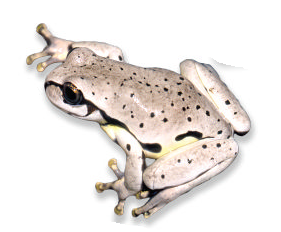

Conservation status
- Endangered (IUCN 3.1)

Scientific classification
- Kingdom: Animalia
- Phylum: Chordata
- Class: Amphibia
- Order: Anura
- Family: Hylidae
- Genus: Sarcohyla
- Species: S. labeculata

Binomial name
- Sarcohyla labeculata (Shannon, 1951)

Synonyms
- Hyla bistincta labeculata Shannon, 1951; Hyla calthula Ustach, Mendelson, McDiarmid, and Campbell, 2000; Plectrohyla calthula (Ustach, Mendelson, McDiarmid, and Campbell, 2000); Sarcohyla calthula (Ustach, Mendelson, McDiarmid, and Campbell, 2000); Hyla ephemera Meik, Canseco-Márquez, Smith, and Campbell, 2005; Plectrohyla ephemera (Meik, Canseco-Márquez, Smith, and Campbell, 2005); Sarcohyla ephemera (Meik, Canseco-Márquez, Smith, and Campbell, 2005)

= Sarcohyla labeculata =

Species of frog

Sarcohyla labeculata is a species of frog in the family Hylidae. It is endemic to the Sierra Mixe in Oaxaca, Mexico. This species was resurrected from synonymy of Sarcohyla bistincta in 2018, while at the same time bringing Sarcohyla calthula and Sarcohyla ephemera in its synonymy. Common name Mixe streamside treefrog has been proposed for this species, whereas the common names yellow-robed treefrog and Cerro Las Flores spikethumb frog referred to the former S. calthula and S. ephemera, respectively.

== Description ==
Males can grow to 59 mm (2.3 in) and females to 61 mm (2.4 in) in snout–vent length. The snout is short and bluntly rounded in dorsal profile but truncate in lateral profile. The tympanum is distinct but its upper edge is obscured by the supratympanic fold. The fingers are long and slender and bear moderately large discs; only vestigial webbing is present. The toes are moderately long and slender and bear discs that are almost as large as the finger ones. The toes are partially webbed. In males the upper parts have yellowish tan coloration. There are often small black markings on posterior of the dorsum. A black stripe runs from the snout through the loreal region and eye along the supratympanic fold to the forelimb insertion, thence onto the flank and to the groin; the dark flank marking is usually continuous but sometimes interrupted posteriorly or consisting of elongate, horizontal blotches. The ventral surfaces are mostly cream, often with coarse dark vermiculations on the throat and the chest. The iris is gold, pale copper, or bronze and has black reticulations.

== Habitat and conservation ==
Sarcohyla labeculata occurs along small streams and seeps in cloud forest and secondary growth at elevations of 1,100–1,896 m (3,609–6,220 ft) above sea level. This species is known from only very few locations and is threatened by forest clearance and logging for small-scale agriculture and residential development. Chytridiomycosis might also be a threat, as suggested by tadpoles with deformed or missing mouthparts in one population.
