= Sarcohyla pachyderma =

Conservation status
- Critically Endangered (IUCN 3.1)

Scientific classification
- Kingdom: Animalia
- Phylum: Chordata
- Class: Amphibia
- Order: Anura
- Family: Hylidae
- Genus: Sarcohyla
- Species: S. pachyderma

Binomial name
- Sarcohyla pachyderma (Taylor, 1942)

Synonyms
- Plectrohyla pachyderma (Taylor, 1942)

Species of frog

Sarcohyla pachyderma is a species of frog in the family Hylidae. It is endemic to Mexico. Its natural habitats are subtropical or tropical moist montane forests. Scientists know it from a single stream on the eastern side of the Sierra Madre mountains in Veracruz, 1600 meters above sea level.

Scientists believe this frog to be "critically endangered, possibly extinct," with no more than fifty adult frogs alive as of the 2019 IUCN assessment. No individuals have been formally observed since 1940.
