= Sarcohyla arborescandens =

Conservation status
- Near Threatened (IUCN 3.1)

Scientific classification
- Kingdom: Animalia
- Phylum: Chordata
- Class: Amphibia
- Order: Anura
- Family: Hylidae
- Genus: Sarcohyla
- Species: S. arborescandens

Binomial name
- Sarcohyla arborescandens (Taylor, 1939)

Synonyms
- Plectrohyla arborescandens (Taylor, 1939)

Species of frog

Sarcohyla arborescandens is a species of frog in the family Hylidae. It is endemic to Mexico. Its natural habitats are subtropical or tropical moist montane forests and rivers. This frog has been observed between 1800 and 3100 meters above sea level.

This frog breeds in streams, and scientists have observed it in some streams in disturbed habitats, such as streams through cleared areas and roadside pools.

Scientists believe human beings in central Veracruz probably consume these frogs as food.
