= Plectrohyla pycnochila =

Conservation status
- Critically Endangered (IUCN 3.1)

Scientific classification
- Kingdom: Animalia
- Phylum: Chordata
- Class: Amphibia
- Order: Anura
- Family: Hylidae
- Genus: Plectrohyla
- Species: P. pycnochila

Binomial name
- Plectrohyla pycnochila Rabb, 1959

Synonyms
- Hyla pycnochila (Rabb, 1959)

Species of amphibian

Plectrohyla pycnochila – also known as the thicklip spikethumb frog or thick-lipped spikethumb frog – is a frog in the Hylidae family. It is endemic to Mexico and occurs in the Chiapas Highlands of central Chiapas state. Its natural habitats are pine–oak forests. It is threatened by habitat loss caused by logging and transformation of the forest to agricultural land. Chytridiomycosis might also be a threat.
