= Sarcohyla chryses =

Conservation status
- Endangered (IUCN 3.1)

Scientific classification
- Kingdom: Animalia
- Phylum: Chordata
- Class: Amphibia
- Order: Anura
- Family: Hylidae
- Genus: Sarcohyla
- Species: S. chryses

Binomial name
- Sarcohyla chryses (Adler, 1965)

Synonyms
- Hyla chryses Adler, 1965; Plectrohyla chryses (Adler, 1965)

Species of frog

Sarcohyla chryses, also known as the golden treefrog, is a species of frog in the family Hylidae. It is endemic to the Sierra Madre del Sur in Guerrero, Mexico. Its sister species is Sarcohyla mykter.

Sarcohyla chryses occurs in humid cool areas in wet pine-oak forest, cloud forest, and fir forest at elevations of 2,300–2,600 m (7,500–8,500 ft) above sea level; it can also occur inside caves. It breeds in streams. It is threatened by habitat loss and potentially also by chytridiomycosis. It is present in Parque Nacional Guerrero [sic].
