= Sarcohyla cyclada =

Conservation status
- Vulnerable (IUCN 3.1)

Scientific classification
- Kingdom: Animalia
- Phylum: Chordata
- Class: Amphibia
- Order: Anura
- Family: Hylidae
- Genus: Sarcohyla
- Species: S. cyclada

Binomial name
- Sarcohyla cyclada (Campbell & Duellman, 2000)

Synonyms
- Plectrohyla cyclada (Campbell and Duellman, 2000)

Species of frog

Sarcohyla cyclada is a species of frog in the family Hylidae. It is endemic to the Sierra Madre de Oaxaca of Mexico.

== Appearance ==
This frog can change color. At night, the skin of the dorsum is a very light brown and yellow-brown toward the vent. During the day, the skin of the dorsum is brown with green marks and green-brown toward the vent. It has webbed skin on all four feet, though the webbing is more extensive on the hind feet.

== Taxonomy ==
Herpetologist Duellman says this frog is most closely related to frogs in the Hyla miotympanum group.

== Habitat and threats ==
Its natural habitats are temperate forests, subtropical or tropical moist montane forests, and intermittent rivers. Scientists have observed it in cloud forests between 1600 and 2180 meters above sea level, in pine and oak forests at 2370 and 2670 meters above sea level, and in cloud forest and oak and madroño forests between 2121 and 2568 meters above sea level.

This population is classified as vulnerable to extinction. Scientists attribute this to habitat loss associated with logging. The fungal disease chytridiomycosis is also present in this frog's range.
