= Sarcohyla celata =

Conservation status
- Near Threatened (IUCN 3.1)

Scientific classification
- Kingdom: Animalia
- Phylum: Chordata
- Class: Amphibia
- Order: Anura
- Family: Hylidae
- Genus: Sarcohyla
- Species: S. celata

Binomial name
- Sarcohyla celata (Toal and Mendelson, 1995)

Synonyms
- Hyla celata Toal and Mendelson, 1995; Plectrohyla celata (Toal and Mendelson, 1995)

Species of frog

Sarcohyla celata, also known as the Oaxaca treefrog, is a species of frog in the family Hylidae. It is endemic to Mexico and only known from the Sierra de Juárez in northern Oaxaca. After having not been seen after 1984, it was feared that the species might be extinct. However, the species was rediscovered in field surveys during 2011–2014 and some subpopulations are at healthy levels.

== Taxonomy ==
This species was described in 1995 based on specimens collected in 1969–1970 that were first identified as Hyla siopela (now Sarcohyla siopela), as well as few specimens collected from another nearby locality in 1978–1981.

== Description ==
Sarcohyla celata is a moderately-sized frog. Adult males measure 38–56 mm (1.5–2.2 in) and females 38–51 mm (1.5–2.0 in) in snout–vent length (although the largest specimen was a male, females are larger on average). The snout is blunt. The tympanum is evident. The fingers are long and have vestigial webbing whereas the toes are moderately webbed. The dorsum is bronze brown or leaf green and has scattered, distinct black flecks, mostly on the lateral surfaces of the body. The eyes are bronze with black reticulations. Adult males have prepollex that is ossified, enlarged, and blunt (the "spikethumb"), and bears small nuptial excrescences.

== Habitat and conservation ==
The species' natural habitats are cloud forests with pristine streams at elevations of 2,640–2,890 m (8,660–9,480 ft) above sea level. They breed in streams. Individuals have been found on a mossy rock wall at night, sitting in the spray of a small waterfall, and in direct sunlight on rocks in the middle of a stream.

Sarcohyla celata has always been a rare species. The decline of the species has been attributed to chytridiomycosis, habitat loss and change caused by logging and other human activities, and desiccation. The population has recovered and is now considered stable.
