= Plectrohyla ixil =

Conservation status
- Vulnerable (IUCN 3.1)

Scientific classification
- Kingdom: Animalia
- Phylum: Chordata
- Class: Amphibia
- Order: Anura
- Family: Hylidae
- Genus: Plectrohyla
- Species: P. ixil

Binomial name
- Plectrohyla ixil Stuart, 1942

Species of frog

Plectrohyla ixil is a species of frog in the family Hylidae. It is found in Guatemala and Mexico. Its natural habitats are subtropical or tropical moist montane forests and rivers. It is threatened by habitat loss.
