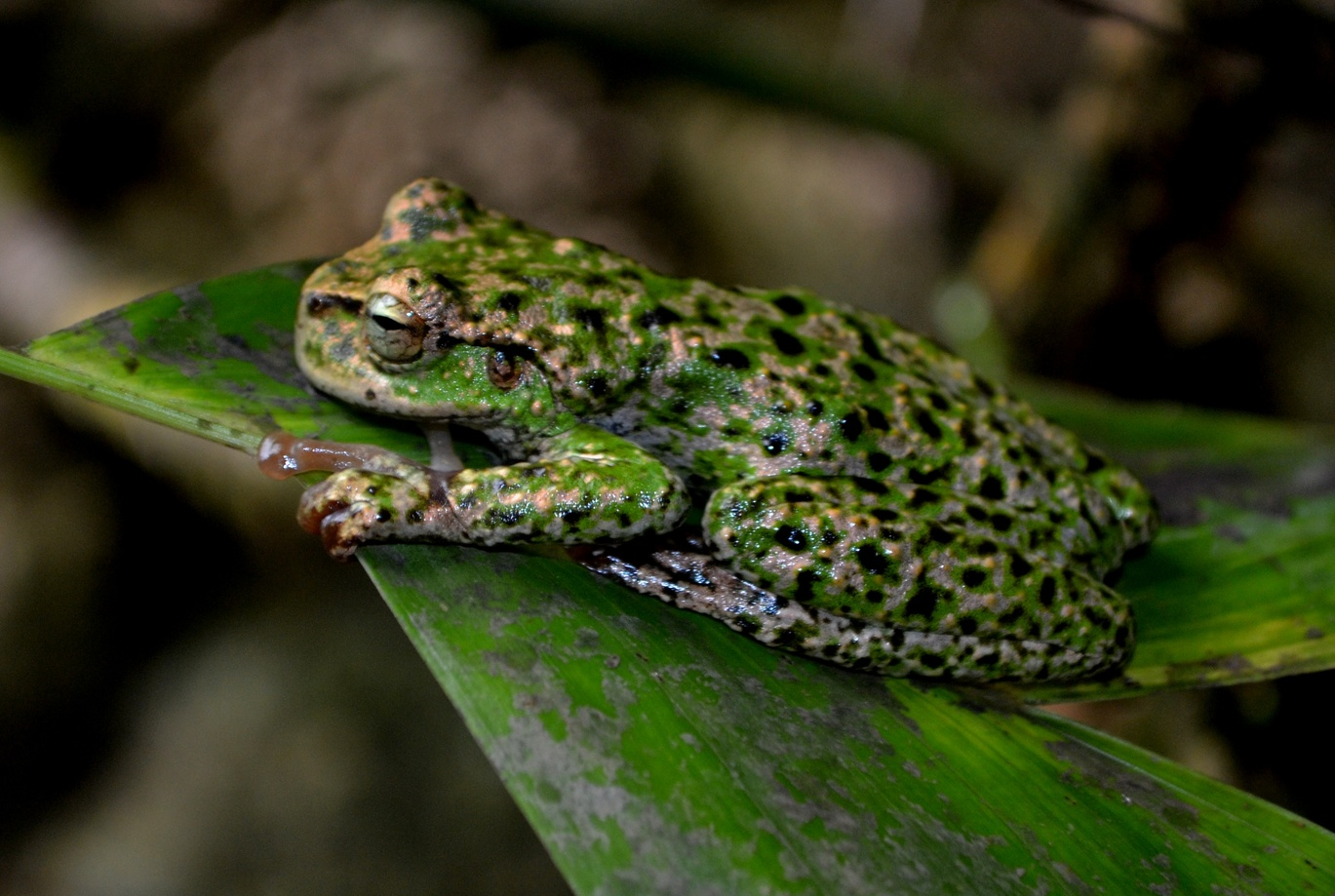
- P. acanthodes in Chiapas, Mexico

Conservation status
- Endangered (IUCN 3.1)

Scientific classification
- Kingdom: Animalia
- Phylum: Chordata
- Class: Amphibia
- Order: Anura
- Family: Hylidae
- Genus: Plectrohyla
- Species: P. acanthodes

Binomial name
- Plectrohyla acanthodes Duellman & Campbell, 1992

= Plectrohyla acanthodes =

Species of amphibian

Plectrohyla acanthodes (commonly known as the thorny spikethumb frog) is a species of frog in the family Hylidae. It is found in Guatemala and Mexico. Its natural habitats are subtropical or tropical moist montane forests and rivers. It is threatened by habitat loss.
