= Plectrohyla lacertosa =

Conservation status
- Endangered (IUCN 3.1)

Scientific classification
- Kingdom: Animalia
- Phylum: Chordata
- Class: Amphibia
- Order: Anura
- Family: Hylidae
- Genus: Plectrohyla
- Species: P. lacertosa

Binomial name
- Plectrohyla lacertosa Bumzahem & Smith, 1954

Species of frog

Plectrohyla lacertosa is a species of frog in the family Hylidae. It is endemic to Mexico. Its natural habitats are subtropical or tropical moist montane forests and rivers. It is threatened by habitat loss.
