= Anolis matudai =

Conservation status
- Least Concern (IUCN 3.1)

Scientific classification
- Kingdom: Animalia
- Phylum: Chordata
- Class: Reptilia
- Order: Squamata
- Suborder: Iguania
- Family: Dactyloidae
- Genus: Anolis
- Species: A. matudai

Binomial name
- Anolis matudai H.M. Smith, 1956

Synonyms
- Norops matudai (H.M. Smith, 1956)

Species of lizard

Anolis matudai, also known commonly as Matuda's anole and el abaniquillo de Matuda or el anolis de Matuda in New World Spanish, is a species of lizard in the family Dactyloidae. The species is native to parts of Middle America.

== Etymology ==
The specific name, matudai, is in honor of Japanese-Mexican botanist Eizi Matuda.

== Geographic distribution ==
Anolis matudai is found in Guatemala and in southeastern Mexico (Chiapas state).

== Habitat ==
The preferred natural habitat of Anolis matudai is forest, but it has also been found in coffee plantations.

== Reproduction ==
Anolis matudai is oviparous.
