= Sarcohyla psarosema =

Conservation status
- Critically Endangered (IUCN 3.1)

Scientific classification
- Kingdom: Animalia
- Phylum: Chordata
- Class: Amphibia
- Order: Anura
- Family: Hylidae
- Genus: Sarcohyla
- Species: S. psarosema

Binomial name
- Sarcohyla psarosema (Campbell & Duellman, 2000)

Synonyms
- Plectrohyla psarosema (Campbell and Duellman, 2000)

Species of amphibian

Sarcohyla psarosema is a species of frogs in the family Hylidae.

It is endemic to the Sierra Madre de Oaxaca of Mexico. Its natural habitats are subtropical or tropical moist montane forests and rivers. Scientists know it from the type locality: a cloud forest 2103 meters above sea level in the Sierra Mixes in Oaxaca.

The skin of the dorsum is brown in color with white spots. The adult male measures 31.4 cm in snout-vent length and the adult female 37.3 cm. The adult male has very muscular forelegs. It is threatened by habitat loss.
