= Abronia matudai =

Conservation status
- Endangered (IUCN 3.1)
- CITES Appendix II

Scientific classification
- Kingdom: Animalia
- Phylum: Chordata
- Class: Reptilia
- Order: Squamata
- Suborder: Anguimorpha
- Family: Anguidae
- Genus: Abronia
- Species: A. matudai

Binomial name
- Abronia matudai (Hartweg & Tihen, 1946)
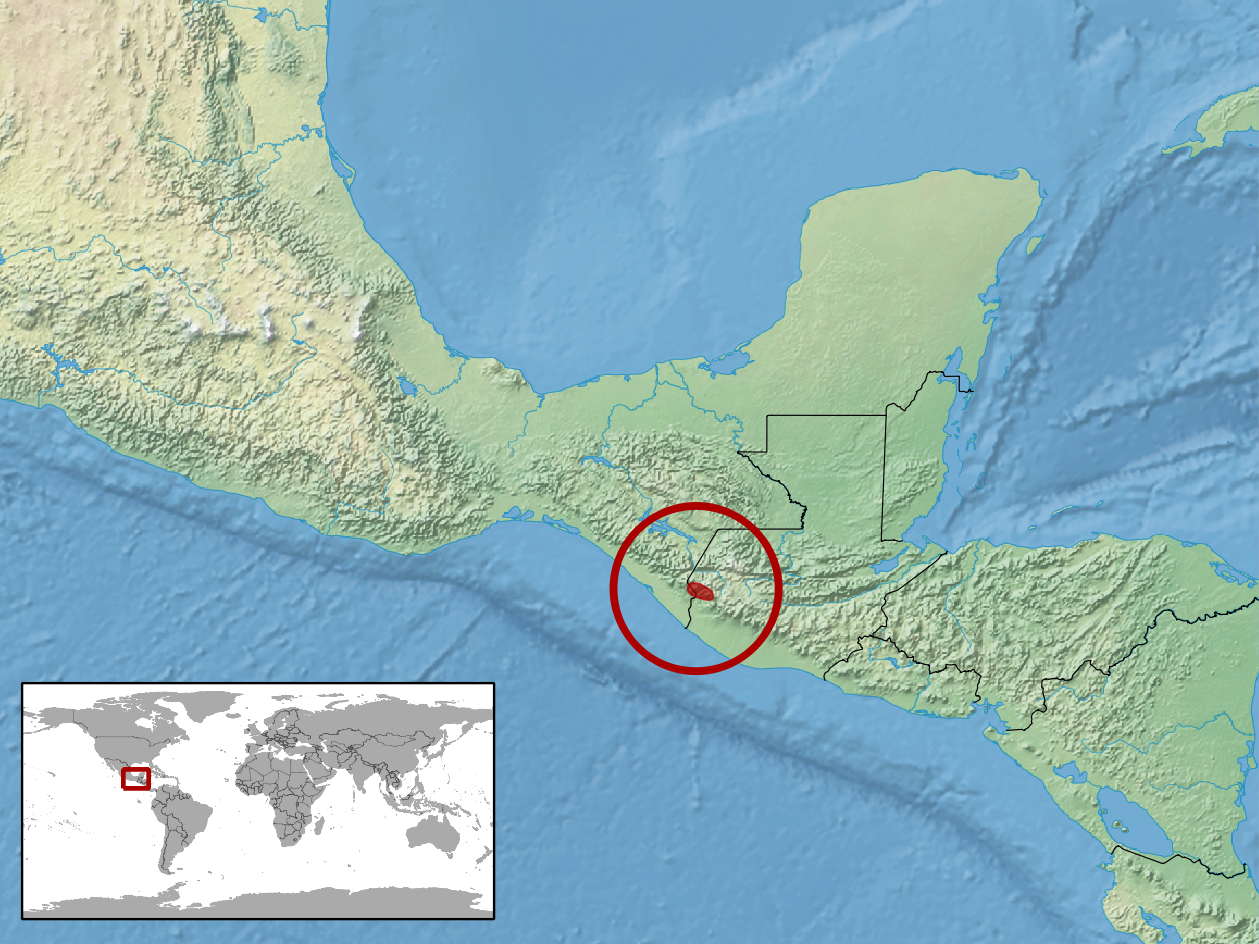

Synonyms
- Gerrhonotus matudai Hartweg & Tihen, 1946; Abronia matudai — Tihen, 1949

Species of lizard

Abronia matudai, also known commonly as Matuda's arboreal alligator lizard and escorpión arborícola de Matuda in New World Spanish, is a species of endangered arboreal alligator lizard in the family Anguidae. The species, which was originally described in 1946 by Norman Hartweg and Joseph Tihen, is native to Middle America.

== Etymology ==
The specific name, matudai, is in honor of Eizi Matuda, a Japanese-born Mexican botanist.

== Geographic distribution ==
Abronia matudai is found in southwestern Guatemala and southeastern Chiapas, Mexico.

== Habitat ==
Abronia matudai is found at elevations of 1,950 to 2,630 m (6,400 to 8,630 ft).

== Description ==
Dorsally, Abronia matudai is green in life (fading to blue gray in alcohol), with about 11 dark crossbars on the head and body, and a corresponding number on the tail. The holotype has a snout-to-vent length (SVL) of 77 mm (3.0 in), and the tail is approximately the same length.

== Reproduction ==
Abronia matudai is viviparous.
