= Plectrohyla pokomchi =

Conservation status
- Endangered (IUCN 3.1)

Scientific classification
- Kingdom: Animalia
- Phylum: Chordata
- Class: Amphibia
- Order: Anura
- Family: Hylidae
- Genus: Plectrohyla
- Species: P. pokomchi

Binomial name
- Plectrohyla pokomchi Duellman and Campbell, 1984

Species of amphibian

Plectrohyla pokomchi is a species of frogs in the family Hylidae. It is endemic to central and eastern Guatemala and known from Sierra de Xucaneb and Sierra de las Minas at elevations of 1,400–1,900 m (4,600–6,200 ft) above sea level. Its specific name refers to the Poqomchi' people, a group of Indian people from the Guatemalan highlands. Common name Rio Sananja spikethumb frog has been coined for it.

== Description ==
The males grow to 55 mm (2.2 in) and females—based on the only female in the type series—49 mm (1.9 in). The body is robust, with the head slightly wider than the body. The supra-tympanic fold is pronounced; the tympanum is barely evident. The fingers are without webbing whereas the toes are about three-quarters webbed. The skin of the dorsum is shagreened and bears small, round tubercles, more prominently so on the posterior part of the body and the thighs. The coloration is bright green, with darker green or gray tubercles. The flanks and posterior surfaces of thighs are mottled with gray or brown. The venter is dull white, suffused heavily with pale gray. The webbing on the feet red or reddish purple. The iris is bronze with black reticulations.

The tadpoles measure up to 69 mm (2.7 in) in total length and have an ovoid, slightly vertically flattened body. The tail is muscular with relatively narrow fins.

== Habitat and conservation ==
Plectrohyla pokomchi live in cloud forests, generally near cascading mountain streams. The tadpoles develop in the streams.

The species is uncommon. There is evidence that it has dramatically declined at some sites, and perhaps been extirpated. This may have been caused by chytridiomycosis. Also habitat loss is a major threat. The species is considered " endangered".
