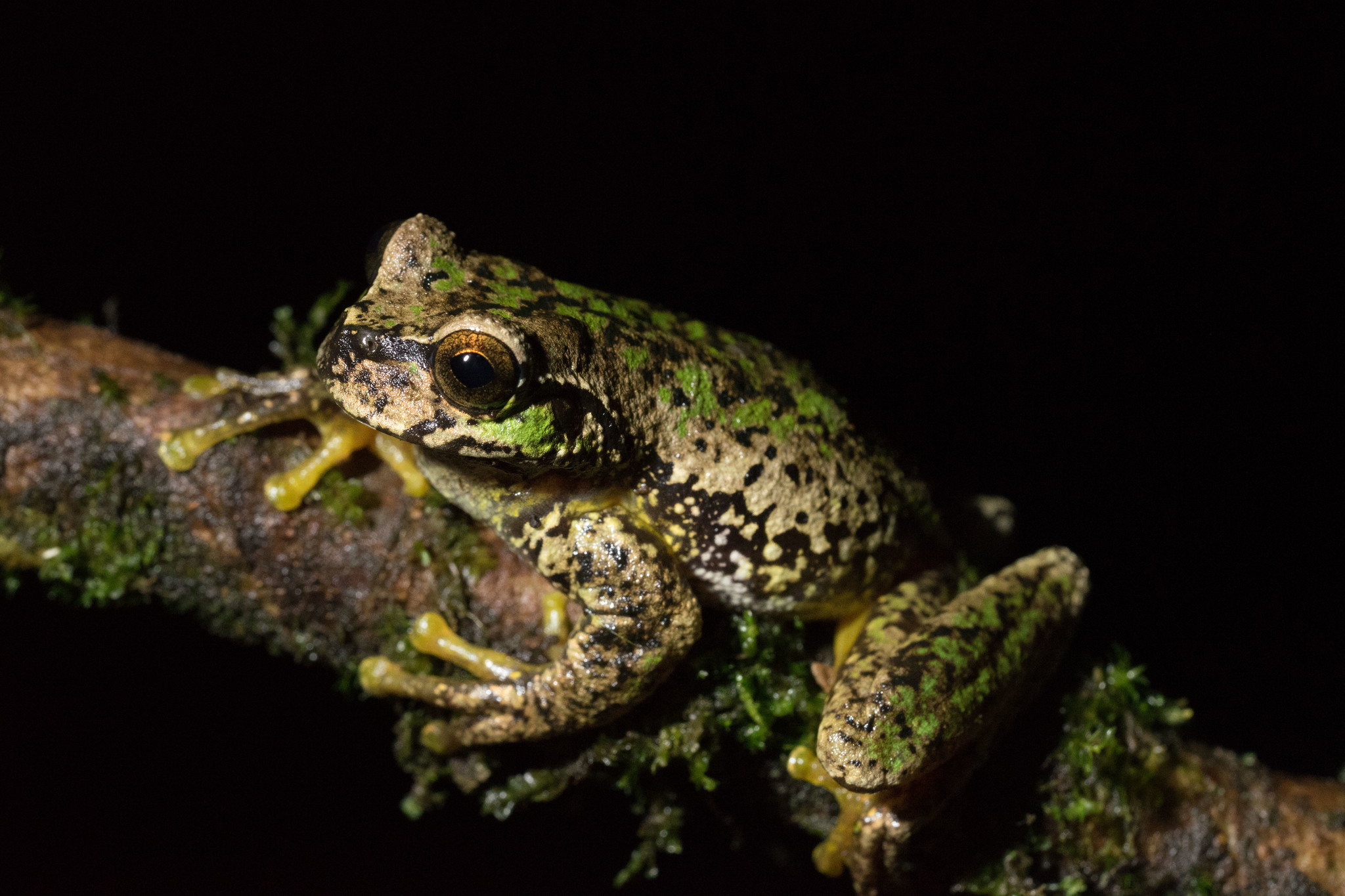

Conservation status
- Endangered (IUCN 3.1)

Scientific classification
- Kingdom: Animalia
- Phylum: Chordata
- Class: Amphibia
- Order: Anura
- Family: Hylidae
- Genus: Plectrohyla
- Species: P. quecchi

Binomial name
- Plectrohyla quecchi Stuart, 1942

= Plectrohyla quecchi =

Species of frog

Plectrohyla quecchi is a species of frog in the family Hylidae. It is endemic to Guatemala. Its natural habitats are subtropical or tropical moist lowland forests, subtropical or tropical moist montane forests, and rivers. It is threatened by habitat loss.
