= Sarcohyla calvicollina =

Conservation status
- Critically Endangered (IUCN 3.1)

Scientific classification
- Kingdom: Animalia
- Phylum: Chordata
- Class: Amphibia
- Order: Anura
- Family: Hylidae
- Genus: Sarcohyla
- Species: S. calvicollina

Binomial name
- Sarcohyla calvicollina (Toal, 1994)

Synonyms
- Plectrohyla calvicollina (Toal, 1994)

Species of frog

Sarcohyla calvicollina (common name: Cerro Pelón Treefrog) is a species of frog in the family Hylidae. It is endemic to Mexico. Scientists have only seen it in two pages: 2519 and 2712 meters above sea level on Cerro Pelón in Oaxaca.

Scientists have observed this frog in rocky-floored streams in cloud forests.

Scientists consider this frog endangered, possibly extinct already. None have been formally observed since 1980. They speculate that there were probably no more than fifty mature individuals alive as of the 2021 IUCN assessment. The cause of the decline is not confirmed, but scientists noted a correlation with the arrival of the fungus Batrachochytrium dendrobatidis, which can sicken and kill frogs and other amphibians. Other stream frogs in the area have also succumbed to chytridiomycosis. There has also been deforestation associated with agriculture and logging.
