= Sarcohyla labedactyla =

Conservation status
- Critically Endangered (IUCN 3.1)

Scientific classification
- Kingdom: Animalia
- Phylum: Chordata
- Class: Amphibia
- Order: Anura
- Family: Hylidae
- Genus: Sarcohyla
- Species: S. labedactyla

Binomial name
- Sarcohyla labedactyla (Mendelson & Toal, 1996)

Synonyms
- Plectrohyla labedactyla (Mendelson & Toal, 1996)

Species of frog

Sarcohyla labedactyla is a species of frog in the family Hylidae. It is endemic to Mexico. Its natural habitats are temperate forests and rivers. It has been observed.2000 meters above sea level. It is threatened by habitat loss.
