= Pine forest stream frog =

Conservation status
- Vulnerable (IUCN 3.1)

Scientific classification
- Kingdom: Animalia
- Phylum: Chordata
- Class: Amphibia
- Order: Anura
- Family: Hylidae
- Genus: Ptychohyla
- Species: P. macrotympanum

Binomial name
- Ptychohyla macrotympanum Campbell & Smith, 1992

Species of amphibian

The pine forest stream frog (Ptychohyla macrotympanum) is a species of frog in the family Hylidae found in Guatemala and Mexico. Its natural habitats are subtropical or tropical dry forests, rivers, and heavily degraded former forest. It is threatened by habitat loss.

Besides habitat loss, invasive species and diseases contribute to the decline of the pine forest stream frog. Ecological studies and actions have been performed in order to protect the species, such as placing barriers around their habitats and developing treatments for disease within the species.
