= Plectrohyla calvata =

Conservation status
- Critically Endangered (IUCN 3.1)

Scientific classification
- Kingdom: Animalia
- Phylum: Chordata
- Class: Amphibia
- Order: Anura
- Family: Hylidae
- Genus: Plectrohyla
- Species: P. calvata

Binomial name
- Plectrohyla calvata McCranie, 2017

Species of frog

Plectrohyla calvata is a frog in the family Hylidae, endemic to habitats in Honduras. Scientists have seen it between 1900 and 2500 meters above sea level in cloud forests.

== Original description ==
- McCranie JR (2017). "Specific status of the Montana de Celaque Honduran frogs previously referred to as Plectrohyla guatemalensis (Anura: Hylidae: Hylinae)". Mesoamerican Herpetology. 4: 390–401.
