= Sarcohyla pentheter =

Conservation status
- Vulnerable (IUCN 3.1)

Scientific classification
- Kingdom: Animalia
- Phylum: Chordata
- Class: Amphibia
- Order: Anura
- Family: Hylidae
- Genus: Sarcohyla
- Species: S. pentheter

Binomial name
- Sarcohyla pentheter (Adler, 1965)

Synonyms
- Plectrohyla pentheter (Adler, 1965)

Species of frog

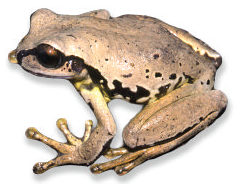

Sarcohyla pentheter, the mourning treefrog, is a species of frog in the family Hylidae. It is endemic to Mexico. Its natural habitats are subtropical or tropical moist montane forests and rivers. Scientists have observed it pine-oak forests on the west side of the Sierra Madre del Sur mountains in Oaxaca between 1,280 and 2,000 meters above sea level.

This frog lays eggs in streams.

It is threatened by habitat loss associated with small farms (including partially shaded coffee farms), small grazing spaces, and mining. It is also vulnerable to the fungal disease chytridiomycosis.
