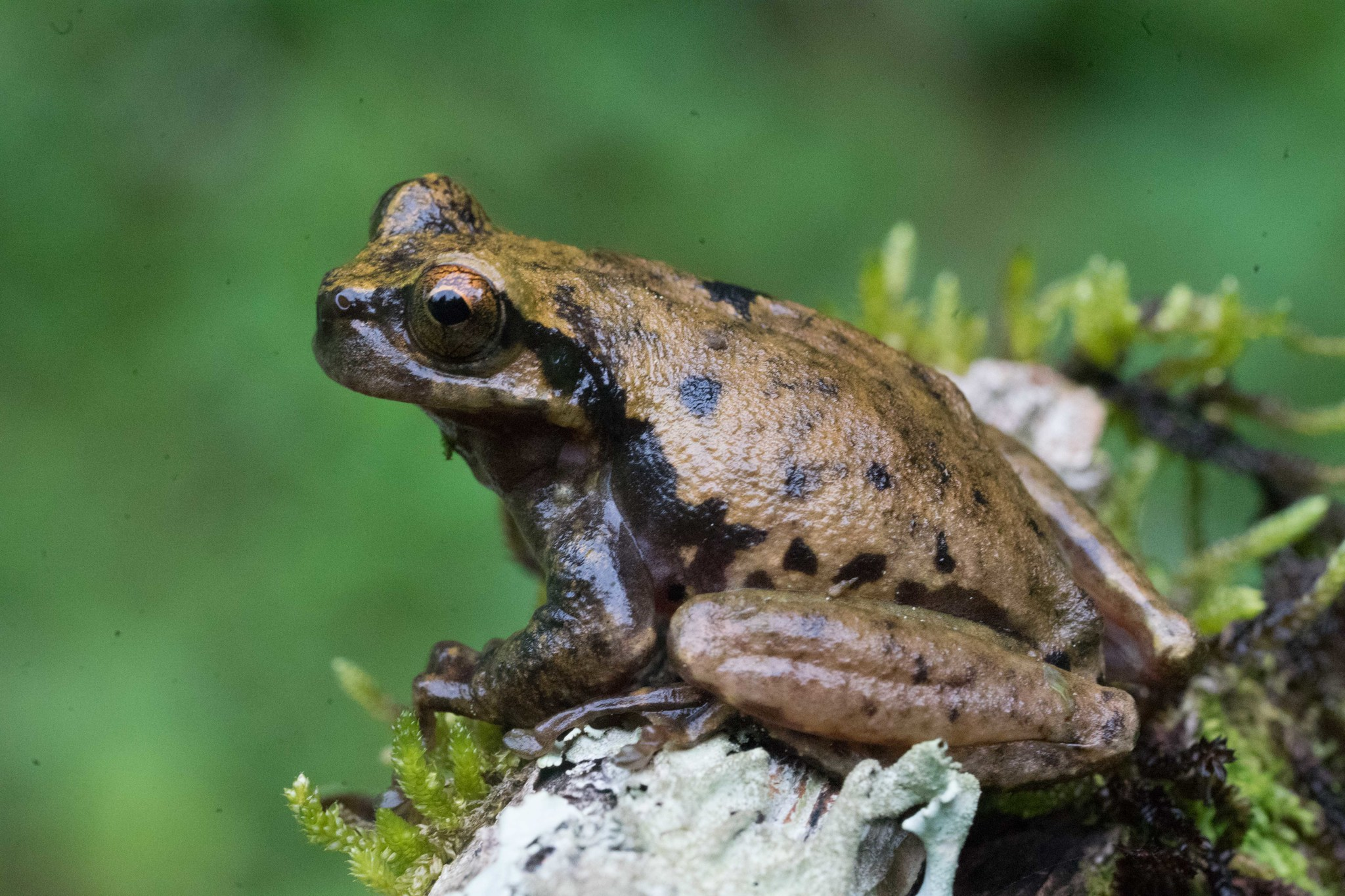

Conservation status
- Least Concern (IUCN 3.1)

Scientific classification
- Kingdom: Animalia
- Phylum: Chordata
- Class: Amphibia
- Order: Anura
- Family: Hylidae
- Genus: Plectrohyla
- Species: P. matudai

Binomial name
- Plectrohyla matudai Hartweg, 1941

Synonyms
- Plectrohyla brachycephala Taylor, 1949; Hyla matudai (Hartweg, 1941)

= Plectrohyla matudai =

Species of amphibian

Plectrohyla matudai (common name: Matuda's spikethumb frog) is a species of frog in the family Hylidae. It is found along the Pacific slopes from southeastern Oaxaca, Mexico, through Chiapas and south-central Guatemala (Las Nubes range); also in the Grijalva Depression in western Guatemala and on Cerro Azul in northwestern Honduras.

== Etymology ==
Norman Hartweg named this species after Eizi Matuda, Japanese–Mexican botanist and his host in Chiapas.

== Description ==
The type series consists of three males (including the holotype) and two females. Males measured 35–41 mm (1.4–1.6 in) and females 36 and 45 mm (1.4 and 1.8 in) in snout–vent length. The head and dorsal surface of body are dark grayish brown, while the sides are lighter but posteriorly mottled with black. Males have bifurcate, rudimentary prepollex (the "spikethumb").

== Habitat and conservation ==
Its natural habitats are pine-oak, cloud, and tropical rain forests at elevations of 900–2,000 m (3,000–6,600 ft) above sea level. It is typically found in low vegetation with abundant leaf litter along small mountain streams.

Plectrohyla matudai is locally common, and in Guatemala it is one of the most common stream-breeding frogs. It is threatened by habitat loss and disturbance. Chytridiomycosis is also a potential threat, although it seems relatively resistant to it, at least as an adult. Its distribution includes several protected areas.
