= Sarcohyla charadricola =

Conservation status
- Critically Endangered (IUCN 3.1)

Scientific classification
- Kingdom: Animalia
- Phylum: Chordata
- Class: Amphibia
- Order: Anura
- Family: Hylidae
- Genus: Sarcohyla
- Species: S. charadricola

Binomial name
- Sarcohyla charadricola (Duellman, 1964)

Synonyms
- Plectrohyla charadricola (Duellman, 1964)

Species of amphibian

Sarcohyla charadricola is a species of frogs in the family Hylidae.

It is endemic to Mexico, in the state of Hidalgo. Scientists have seen it in forests between 2000 and 2300 meters above sea level.

This frog is classified as critically endangered and possibly extinct by the IUCN because of the extensive deforestation that has taken place in Mexico. It is believed that there are probably fewer than 50 adults alive as of the 2019 assessment. They presume that the frog would be vulnerable to the fungal disease chytridiomycosis, though they have not observed even one infected frog—because they have observed no specimens of this species at all since 1961.

These frogs live on bromeliad plants in pine and pine-oak forests, but lay eggs in streams and develop as tadpoles.
