= Sarcohyla floresi =

Conservation status
- Vulnerable (IUCN 3.1)

Scientific classification
- Kingdom: Animalia
- Phylum: Chordata
- Class: Amphibia
- Order: Anura
- Family: Hylidae
- Genus: Sarcohyla
- Species: S. floresi

Binomial name
- Sarcohyla floresi Kaplan, Heimes, and Aguilar, 2020

Species of frog

Sarcohyla floresi is a frog in the family Hylidae, endemic to Mexico. Scientists have seen it between 1461 and 2000 meters above sea level.

This frog has stream-dwelling tadpoles. The adult frogs have a dark dorsolateral stripe bordered in white.
