= Plectrohyla avia =

Conservation status
- Endangered (IUCN 3.1)

Scientific classification
- Kingdom: Animalia
- Phylum: Chordata
- Class: Amphibia
- Order: Anura
- Family: Hylidae
- Genus: Plectrohyla
- Species: P. avia

Binomial name
- Plectrohyla avia Stuart, 1952

Synonyms
- Hyla avia (Stuart, 1952)

Species of amphibian

Plectrohyla avia, also known as the greater spikethumb frog, is a species of frog in the family Hylidae. It occurs in Guatemala and Mexico and is found on the Pacific slopes of the Sierra Madre between southeastern Chiapas (Mexico) and southwestern Guatemala.

== Description ==
Plectrohyla avia is the largest member of the genus Plectrohyla, with males reaching about 90 mm (3.5 in) and females about 70 mm (2.8 in) snout–vent length. It was described by Laurence Cooper Stuart in 1952 based on a single specimen. This specimen—the holotype—is an adult male that measured 86 mm (3.4 in) SVL. The tympanum is small but very distinct. There is a heavy supratympanic fold that merges with the fold-like canthus (or in less technical terms, "lateral skin folds"). The fingers have vestigial webbing whereas the toes are moderately webbed. The prepollex ("spikethumb") is simple and horny. Vocal slits are absent. The teeth of the upper maxilla are long and protruding.

== Reproduction ==
Based on an observation from Chiapas, breeding takes place underwater and involves axillar amplexus. Male advertisement call is a brief and rapid trill. Males were observed calling underwater and from within small holes and crevices in the splash-zone of waterfalls.

== Habitat and conservation ==
Natural habitats of Plectrohyla avia are cloud forests at elevations of 1,700–2,200 m (5,600–7,200 ft) above sea level. It typically occurs in vegetation along mountain streams. Reproduction has been observed just at the start of the rainy season in a small pool. The well-developed lateral skin folds might facilitate dermal respiration.

It is an uncommon to rare species that is threatened by habitat loss (deforestation and transformation of forest to agricultural areas) as well as chytridiomycosis. It might be, however, more common and widespread than currently thought, but with only a short period of activity at the beginning of the rainy season.
