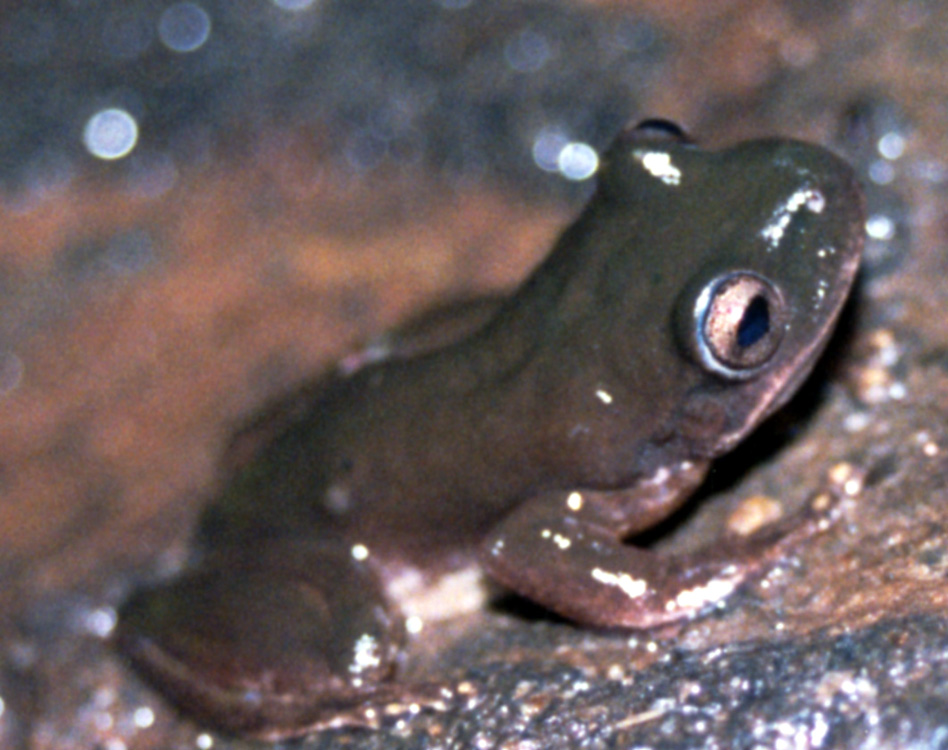
- Ptychohyla salvadorensis

Scientific classification
- Domain: Eukaryota
- Kingdom: Animalia
- Phylum: Chordata
- Class: Amphibia
- Order: Anura
- Family: Hylidae
- Subfamily: Hylinae
- Genus: Ptychohyla; Taylor, 1944

Species
- See text.

= Ptychohyla =

Genus of amphibians

Ptychohyla is a genus of frogs (common names: stream frogs, mountain stream frogs) in the family Hylidae. These frogs are found in the southern Mexican states of Chiapas, Guerrero, and Oaxaca, and Central America to western Panama.

Ptychohyla has a pale pink iris and nuptial outgrowth in breeding males that differentiates this new species from other Mexican frog groups. This new species usually live in untouched tropical forest. They are known to be vulnerable in modified habitat by humans.

== Species ==
The following species are recognised in the genus Ptychohyla:

Binomial name and author	Common name
P. dendrophasma (Campbell, Smith, and Acevedo, 2000)	Phantom treefrog
P. euthysanota (Kellogg, 1928)	Cloud forest stream frog
P. hypomykter (McCranie and Wilson, 1993)	Copan stream frog
P. legleri (Taylor, 1958)	Legler's stream frog
P. leonhardschultzei (Ahl, 1934)	Schultze's stream frog
P. macrotympanum (Tanner, 1957)	Pine forest stream frog
P. salvadorensis (Mertens, 1952)	Salvador stream frog
P. zophodes (Campbell and Duellman, 2000)	Gloomy Mountain stream frog
