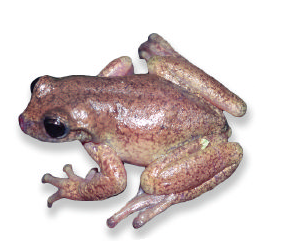

Conservation status
- Endangered (IUCN 3.1)

Scientific classification
- Kingdom: Animalia
- Phylum: Chordata
- Class: Amphibia
- Order: Anura
- Family: Hylidae
- Genus: Sarcohyla
- Species: S. mykter

Binomial name
- Sarcohyla mykter (Adler and Dennis, 1972)

Synonyms
- Hyla mykter Adler and Dennis, 1972; Plectrohyla mykter (Adler and Dennis, 1972)

= Sarcohyla mykter =

Species of frog

Sarcohyla mykter, also known as the keelsnout treefrog or keel-snouted treefrog, is a species of frog in the family Hylidae. It is endemic to the Sierra Madre del Sur in Guerrero, Mexico. Its sister species is Sarcohyla chryses.

Sarcohyla mykter occurs in high-elevation (1,985–2,520 m (6,512–8,268 ft) above sea level) cloud and wet pine-oak forest and oak woodland in association with streams, its breeding habitat. It is an uncommon species, even though it is regularly encountered during surveys. It is threatened by habitat loss and potentially also by chytridiomycosis. It is not known from protected areas.
