= Ptychohyla dendrophasma =

Conservation status
- Critically Endangered (IUCN 3.1)

Scientific classification
- Kingdom: Animalia
- Phylum: Chordata
- Class: Amphibia
- Order: Anura
- Family: Hylidae
- Genus: Ptychohyla
- Species: P. dendrophasma

Binomial name
- Ptychohyla dendrophasma (Campbell, Smith & Acevedo, 2000)

Species of frog

Ptychohyla dendrophasma is a species of frog in the family Hylidae found in Guatemala and possibly Mexico. Its natural habitat is subtropical or tropical moist montane forests. It is threatened by habitat loss.
