= Sarcohyla crassa =

Conservation status
- Critically Endangered (IUCN 3.1)

Scientific classification
- Kingdom: Animalia
- Phylum: Chordata
- Class: Amphibia
- Order: Anura
- Family: Hylidae
- Genus: Sarcohyla
- Species: S. crassa

Binomial name
- Sarcohyla crassa (Brocchi, 1877)

Synonyms
- Cauphias crassus Brocchi, 1877; Hyla crassa (Brocchi, 1877); Hypsiboas crassus (Brocchi, 1877); Plectrohyla crassa (Brocchi, 1877); Hyla robustofemora Taylor, 1940 "1939"; Hyla bogertae Straughan and Wright, 1969

Species of frog

Sarcohyla crassa is a species of frog in the family Hylidae. It is endemic to the Sierra Madre de Oaxaca of Oaxaca, Mexico. It is also known as the aquatic treefrog, or when referring to the former Hyla bogertae, Bogert's aquatic treefrog.

Sarcohyla crassa occurs in streams in montane cloud forest at elevations of 1,540–2,650 m (5,050–8,690 ft) above sea level. It is threatened by the loss of original montane forests and possibly chytridiomycosis.
