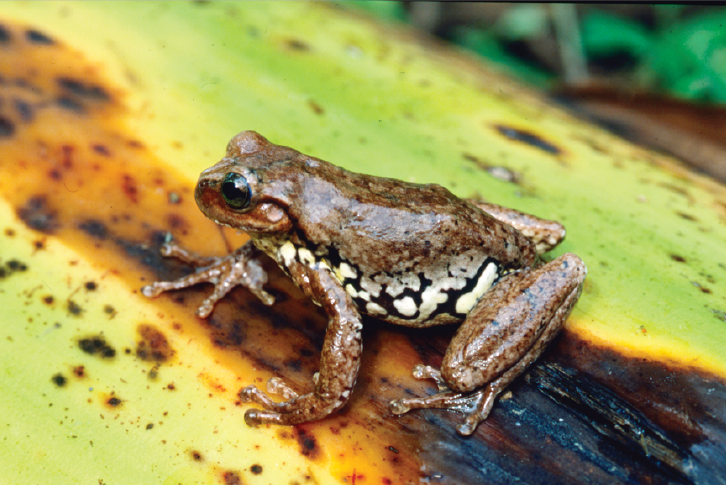

Conservation status
- Least Concern (IUCN 3.1)

Scientific classification
- Kingdom: Animalia
- Phylum: Chordata
- Class: Amphibia
- Order: Anura
- Family: Hylidae
- Genus: Sarcohyla
- Species: S. hapsa

Binomial name
- Sarcohyla hapsa Campbell, Brodie, Caviedes-Solis, Nieto-Montes de Oca, Luja, Flores-Villela, García-Vázquez, Sarker, and Wostl, 2018

= Sarcohyla hapsa =

Species of frog

Sarcohyla hapsa, the northern streamside tree frog, is a frog in the family Hylidae, endemic to Mexico.

== Range and habitat ==
Scientists have seen it between 1,280 and 2,550 meters above sea level in the southern Sierra Madre Occidental from Durango to Nayarit states, the Trans-Mexican Volcanic Belt of Michoacán, Morelos, Guerrero, and Mexico states, and the northern Sierra Madre del Sur of Jalisco and Michoacán states.

This species is found along mountain streams in humid montane pine-oak, pine, and pine-fir forests, where it dwells in streamside vegetation.

== First paper ==
- Jonathan A Campbell; Edmund D Jr Brodie; Itzue W Caviedes-Solis; AdriÁn Nieto-Montes De Oca; VÍctor H Luja; Oscar Flores-Villela; Uri Omar GarcÍa-vÁzquez; Goutam Chandra Sarker; Elijah Wostl; Eric N Smith (May 24, 2018). "Systematics of the frogs allocated to Sarcohyla bistincta sensu lato (Cope, 1877), with description of a new species from Western Mexico". Zootaxa (Abstract). 4422 (3): 366–384. doi:10.11646/zootaxa.4422.3.3. PMID 30313491.
