= Plectrohyla tecunumani =

Conservation status
- Critically Endangered (IUCN 3.1)

Scientific classification
- Kingdom: Animalia
- Phylum: Chordata
- Class: Amphibia
- Order: Anura
- Family: Hylidae
- Genus: Plectrohyla
- Species: P. tecunumani

Binomial name
- Plectrohyla tecunumani Duellman and Campbell, 1984

Species of amphibian

Plectrohyla tecunumani is a species of frogs in the family Hylidae. It is endemic to the Sierra de los Cuchumatanes in western Guatemala. Its specific name refers to Tecun Uman, the Guatemalan national hero. Common name cave spikethumb frog has been coined for it.

== Description ==
The holotype, and the only male in the type series, measured 62 mm (2.4 in) in snout–vent length. Females in the type series measured up to 57 mm (2.2 in). The body is robust, with the head narrower than the body. The supra-tympanic fold is pronounced; the tympanum is distinct in females but indistinct in the male. The skin of the head and body is densely covered with small, round tubercles; tubercles are smaller and less numerous on limbs. There are large tubercles posteroventral to the eye. The fingers are without webbing but have dermal fringes; the toes are two-thirds webbed.

The tadpoles measure up to 64 mm (2.5 in) in total length and have an ovoid, vertically flattened body. The tail is muscular with relatively narrow fins.

== Habitat and conservation ==
Plectrohyla tecunumani live in small caves with streams in the mountains of western Guatemala at elevations of 3,200–3,395 m (10,499–11,138 ft) above sea level. Presumably the adults also range in the surrounding montane pine forest. The tadpoles live in the stream within the cave.

The species is only known from two locations. The type locality has suffered from heavy habitat change; a visit there in 1989 resulted in no specimens, although a single tadpole was found nearby in 1995. Another population was discovered in 2002. The suitable habitat in the area is very limited and mostly degraded. Also chytridiomycosis remains a potential threat. The species is considered "critically endangered".
