= Sarcohyla ameibothalame =

Conservation status
- Endangered (IUCN 3.1)

Scientific classification
- Kingdom: Animalia
- Phylum: Chordata
- Class: Amphibia
- Order: Anura
- Family: Hylidae
- Genus: Sarcohyla
- Species: S. ameibothalame

Binomial name
- Sarcohyla ameibothalame (Canseco-Márquez, Mendelson, and Gutiérrez-Mayén, 2002)

Synonyms
- Hyla ameibothalame Canseco-Márquez, Mendelson, and Gutiérrez-Mayén, 2002; Plectrohyla ameibothalame (Canseco-Márquez, Mendelson, and Gutiérrez-Mayén, 2002)

Species of frog

Sarcohyla ameibothalame is a species of frog in the family Hylidae. It is endemic to northwestern Oaxaca, Mexico. Its natural habitats are montane oak forest. Scientists have observed it between 2455 and 2670 meters above sea level in the Sierra Mixes in Oaxaca. They can use bromeliads as refuges. Tadpoles have been found in a small stream. It is presumably threatened by habitat loss and might become threatened by chytridiomycosis.
