= Sarcohyla sabrina =

Conservation status
- Critically endangered, possibly extinct (IUCN 3.1)

Scientific classification
- Kingdom: Animalia
- Phylum: Chordata
- Class: Amphibia
- Order: Anura
- Family: Hylidae
- Genus: Sarcohyla
- Species: S. sabrina

Binomial name
- Sarcohyla sabrina (Caldwell, 1974)

Synonyms
- Hyla sabrina Caldwell, 1974; Plectrohyla sabrina (Caldwell, 1974)

Species of frog

Sarcohyla sabrina, also known as the Sierra Juarez treefrog, is a species of frog in the family Hylidae. It is endemic to the northern slopes of Sierra de Juárez in northern Oaxaca, Mexico. The specific name sabrina is Latin for river nymph and refers to the close association of this species with streams.

== Description ==
Sarcohyla sabrina is a small, slender-limbed frog. Males measure 27–30 mm (1.1–1.2 in) and females 34–41 mm (1.3–1.6 in) in snout–vent length. The tympanum is absent. The fingers lack webbing whereas the toes are about three-fourths webbed. The dorsum is light chocolate brown with mostly green and some dark brown mottling. There is a dark brown stripe running from nostril along the canthus to back of arm. At night, they might be a bright leaf green. Breeding males do not have nuptial spines.

== Habitat and conservation ==
The natural habitats of this species are cloud forest in the highlands of the Sierra de Juárez at elevations of 1,580–2,020 m (5,180–6,630 ft) above sea level. It occurs along streams in moist and rocky habitats with abundant aquatic vegetation.

The population of Sarcohyla sabrina is declining. It is threatened by habitat loss and chytridiomycosis.
