= Sarcohyla thorectes =

Conservation status
- Endangered (IUCN 3.1)

Scientific classification
- Kingdom: Animalia
- Phylum: Chordata
- Class: Amphibia
- Order: Anura
- Family: Hylidae
- Genus: Sarcohyla
- Species: S. thorectes

Binomial name
- Sarcohyla thorectes (Adler, 1965)

Synonyms
- Plectrohyla thorectes (Adler, 1965)

Species of amphibian

Sarcohyla thorectes, commonly known as Adler's mottled tree frog, a species of frog in the family Hylidae. It is endemic to Mexico. Its natural habitats are subtropical or tropical moist montane forests and rivers. It has been observed in streams between 1530 and 1900 meters above sea level in the Sierra Madre del Sur mountains. It is threatened by habitat loss.
