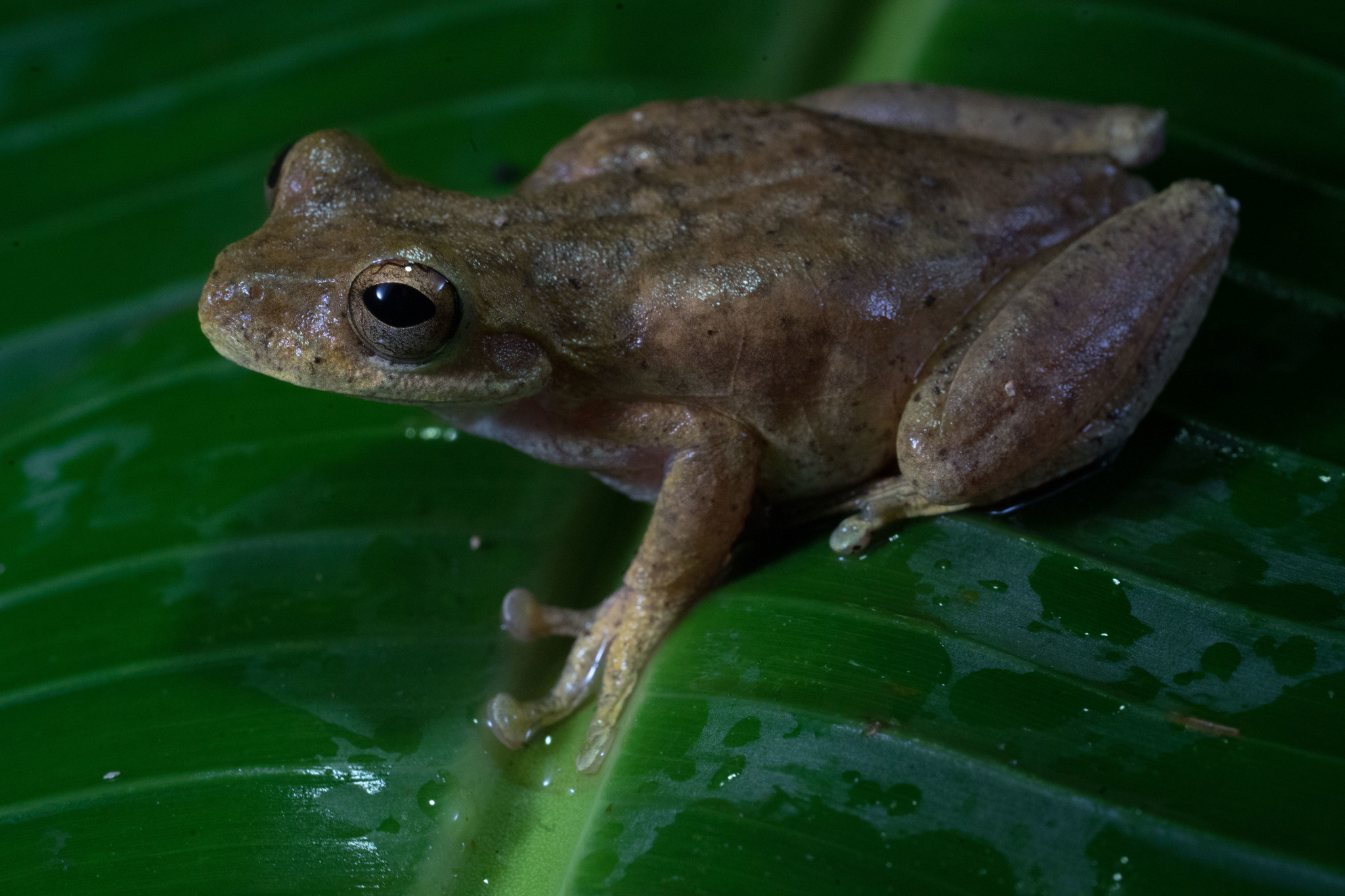

Conservation status
- Least Concern (IUCN 3.1)

Scientific classification
- Kingdom: Animalia
- Phylum: Chordata
- Class: Amphibia
- Order: Anura
- Family: Hylidae
- Genus: Ptychohyla
- Species: P. euthysanota

Binomial name
- Ptychohyla euthysanota (Kellogg, 1923)

= Cloud forest stream frog =

Cloud Forest Stream Frog

Species of amphibian

The cloud forest stream frog (Ptychohyla euthysanota) is a species of frog in the family Hylidae found in El Salvador, Guatemala, Mexico, and possibly Honduras. Its natural habitats are subtropical or tropical moist lowland forest, subtropical or tropical moist montane forest, and rivers. The cloud forest stream frog's lower elevation limit sits at 500 meters and its upper elevation limit is at 2,200 meters (approximately 1640 and 7218 feet respectively). The frog's current population trend is suspected to be decreasing due to the ongoing degradation in the quality and extent of its environment. It is common in Guatemala and Mexico, but the population status in Honduras and El Salvador are unknown. It is threatened by habitat loss. These frogs are semiaquatic, living both terrestrially and in inland freshwater.
