= Plectrohyla glandulosa =

Conservation status
- Critically Endangered (IUCN 3.1)

Scientific classification
- Kingdom: Animalia
- Phylum: Chordata
- Class: Amphibia
- Order: Anura
- Family: Hylidae
- Genus: Plectrohyla
- Species: P. glandulosa

Binomial name
- Plectrohyla glandulosa (Boulenger, 1883)

Species of frog

Plectrohyla glandulosa is a species of frog in the family Hylidae. It is found in Guatemala and possibly Mexico. Its natural habitats are subtropical or tropical moist montane forests, subtropical or tropical high-altitude grassland, and rivers. It is threatened by habitat loss.
