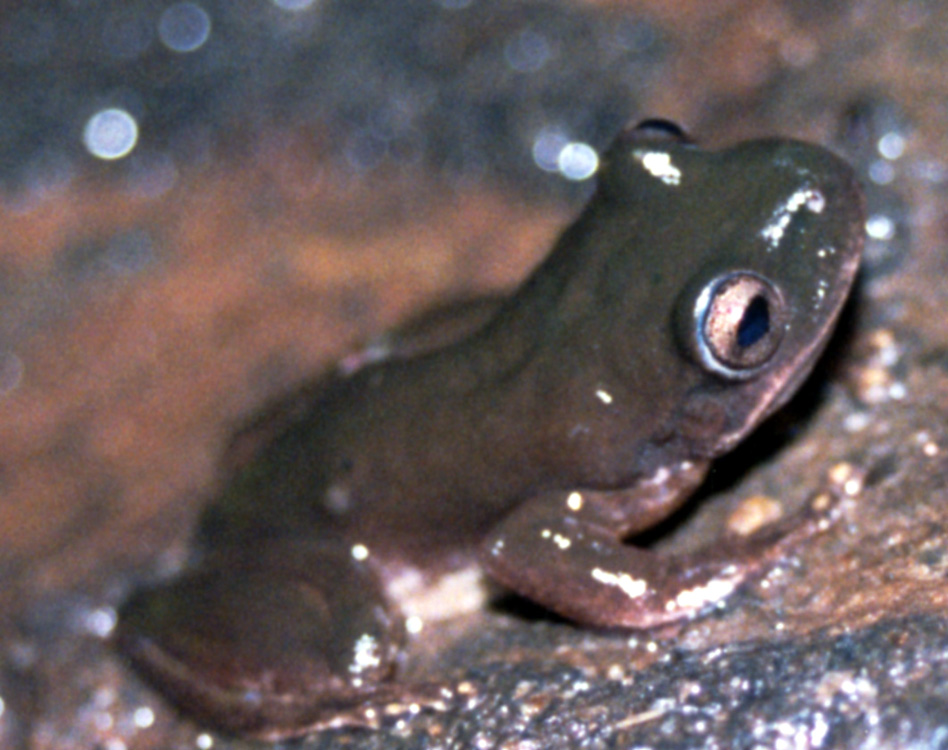

Conservation status
- Near Threatened (IUCN 3.1)

Scientific classification
- Kingdom: Animalia
- Phylum: Chordata
- Class: Amphibia
- Order: Anura
- Family: Hylidae
- Genus: Ptychohyla
- Species: P. salvadorensis

Binomial name
- Ptychohyla salvadorensis (Mertens,1952)

= Ptychohyla salvadorensis =

Species of amphibian

Ptychohyla salvadorensis (common name: Salvador stream frog) is a species of frog in the family Hylidae found in El Salvador, Guatemala, and Honduras. Its natural habitats are subtropical or tropical moist montane forests, rivers, pastureland, and heavily degraded former forests. It is threatened by habitat loss.
