= Plectrohyla hazelae =

Conservation status
- Vulnerable (IUCN 3.1)

Scientific classification
- Kingdom: Animalia
- Phylum: Chordata
- Class: Amphibia
- Order: Anura
- Family: Hylidae
- Genus: Plectrohyla
- Species: P. hazelae

Binomial name
- Plectrohyla hazelae (Taylor, 1940)

Synonyms
- Hyla hazelae (Taylor, 1940); Plectrohyla hazelae (Faivovich, Haddad, Garcia, Frost, Campbell, and Wheeler, 2005); Sarcohyla hazelae (Duellman, Marion, and Hedges, 2016)

Species of frog

Plectrohyla hazelae is a species of frog in the family Hylidae. It is endemic to Mexico. Its natural habitats are subtropical or tropical moist montane forests and rivers. Scientists have seen it in pine-oak forests, in cloud forests, and in other mountain forests. It has been observed between 1,461 and 2,128 meters above sea level.

This frog is vulnerable to extinction for a few reasons. The fungal disease chytridiomycosis can kill this frog. There is also some habitat loss from logging and drainage of the streams in which the tadpoles develop.
