= Plectrohyla psiloderma =

Conservation status
- Endangered (IUCN 3.1)

Scientific classification
- Kingdom: Animalia
- Phylum: Chordata
- Class: Amphibia
- Order: Anura
- Family: Hylidae
- Genus: Plectrohyla
- Species: P. psiloderma

Binomial name
- Plectrohyla psiloderma McCranie and Wilson, 1999

Synonyms
- Hyla psiloderma (McCranie and Wilson, 1999)

Species of amphibian

Plectrohyla psiloderma is a species of frogs in the family Hylidae. It is found in the mountains of western Honduras and adjacent El Salvador. It occurs in lower montane moist forests at elevations of 2,450–2,530 m (8,040–8,300 ft) above sea level, and lives on low vegetation and boulders along pristine streams, its breeding habitat. It is threatened by habitat loss caused primarily by agricultural encroachment and wood extraction. Pesticides are suspected to be a threat. Chytridiomycosis is also a potential threat. It is found in the Celaque National Park in Honduras, and might also occur is some other protected areas.
