= Eizi Matuda =

Mexican botanist (1894–1978)

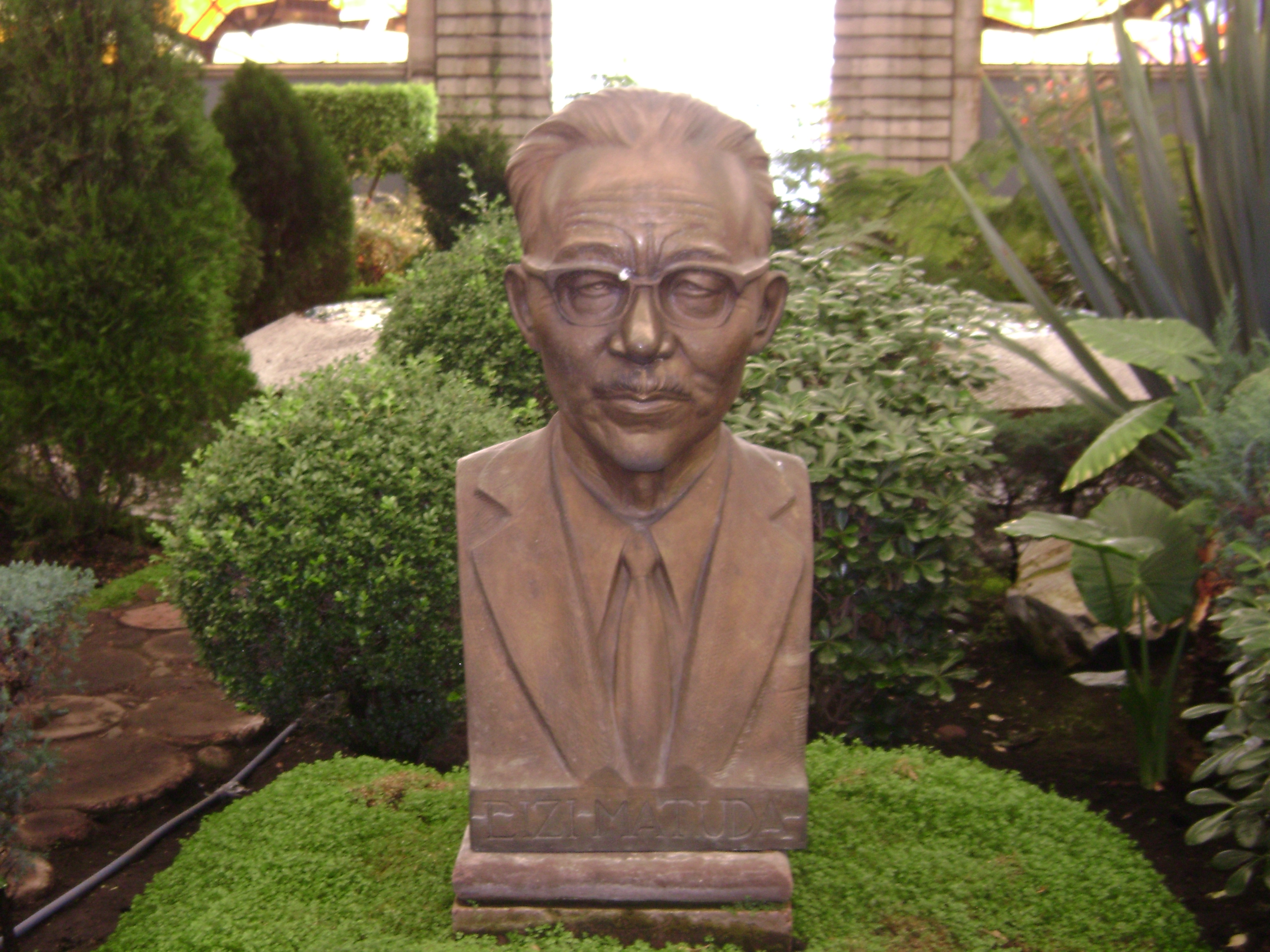
- Bust of Eizi Matuda in the botanical garden of the Cosmovitral.
- Born: 1894; Nagasaki Prefecture, Empire of Japan
- Died: 12 February 1978 (aged 83–84); Lima, Peru
- Citizenship: Japan; Mexico
- Education: Taihoku Imperial University: University of Tokyo
- Spouse: Miduho Kaneko de Matuda
- Scientific career
- Fields: Botany
- Workplaces: National Autonomous University of Mexico

Eiji Matsuda (松田英二, Matsuda Eiji) (1894–1978) was a Mexican botanist of Japanese origin. In scholarly works, his name is generally romanised as "Eizi Matuda" following the "Kunrei" system.

== Personal life ==
Matuda and his wife, Miduho Kaneko de Matuda, were naturalized Mexican citizens and had five children.

== Legacy ==
In 1956, a cactus species native to Mexico was named in his honor, the Mammillaria matudae. The genus Matudina in the sunflower family is also named in his honor.

Two species and one subspecies of reptiles are named in his honor: Abronia matudai (Matuda's arboreal alligator lizard), Anolis matudai (Matuda's anole), and Pseudelaphe flavirufa matudai (Matuda's ratsnake). Two frogs are named after him: Craugastor matudai (Matuda's robber frog) and Plectrohyla matudai (Matuda's spikethumb frog).

The standard author abbreviation Matuda is used to indicate this person as the author when citing a botanical name.
