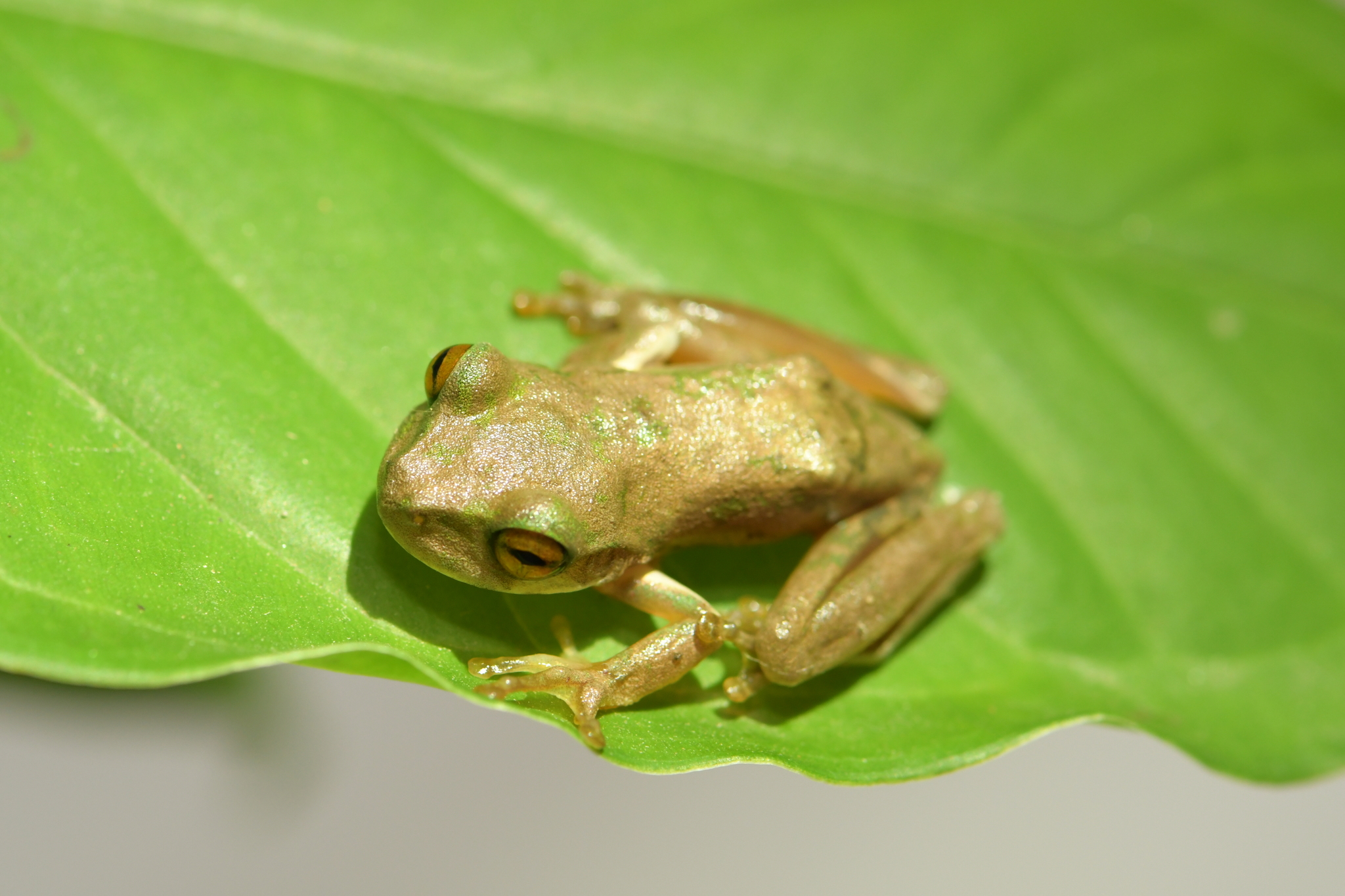

Conservation status
- Least Concern (IUCN 3.1)

Scientific classification
- Kingdom: Animalia
- Phylum: Chordata
- Class: Amphibia
- Order: Anura
- Family: Hylidae
- Genus: Ptychohyla
- Species: P. leonhardschultzei

Binomial name
- Ptychohyla leonhardschultzei (Ahl, 1934)

Synonyms
- Hyla leonhard-schultzei Ahl, 1934; Ptychohyla adipoventris Taylor, 1944; Hyla milleri Shannon, 1951; Ptychohyla leonhardschultzei Duellman, 1960; Ptychohyla leonardschultzei Liner and Casas-Andreu, 2008

= Schultze's stream frog =

Species of amphibian

Schultze's stream frog (Ptychohyla leonhardschultzei) is a species of frog in the family Hylidae endemic to Mexico. It is only known from the Pacific slopes of the Sierra Madre del Sur in Oaxaca and Guerrero states. Its natural habitats are pine-oak and cloud forests. It occurs in or on low vegetation along mountain streams. It is anuncommon species threatened by habitat loss from deforestation and the planting of coffee and other non-timber plantations. Also chytridiomycosis is suspected.
