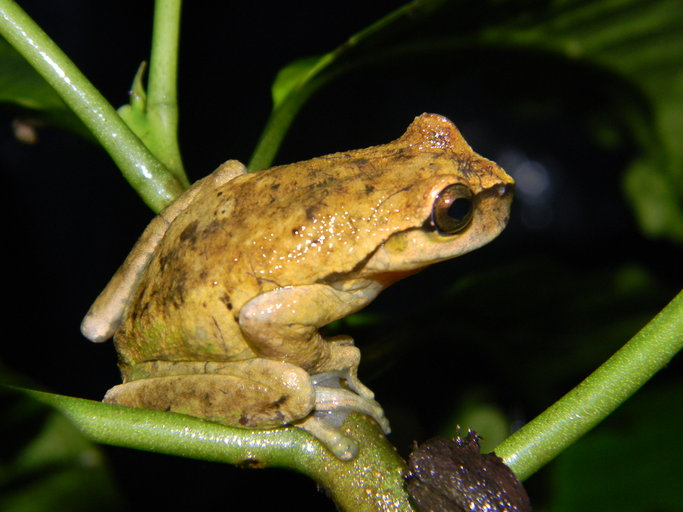

Conservation status
- Vulnerable (IUCN 3.1)

Scientific classification
- Kingdom: Animalia
- Phylum: Chordata
- Class: Amphibia
- Order: Anura
- Family: Hylidae
- Genus: Plectrohyla
- Species: P. sagorum

Binomial name
- Plectrohyla sagorum Hartweg, 1941

Synonyms
- Hyla sagorum (Hartweg, 1941)

= Plectrohyla sagorum =

Species of amphibian

Plectrohyla sagorum (common name: arcane spikethumb frog) is a species of frog in the family Hylidae. It is found in the Sierra Madre de Chiapas from Chiapas (Mexico) to southwestern Guatemala, with a single record from northwestern El Salvador. Its natural habitats are cloud forests at elevations of 1,000–2,050 m (3,280–6,730 ft) above sea level. Breeding takes place in streams. It is very rare in Mexico and El Salvador but abundant at two Guatemalan sites. It is threatened by habitat loss. Chytridiomycosis might also be a threat.
