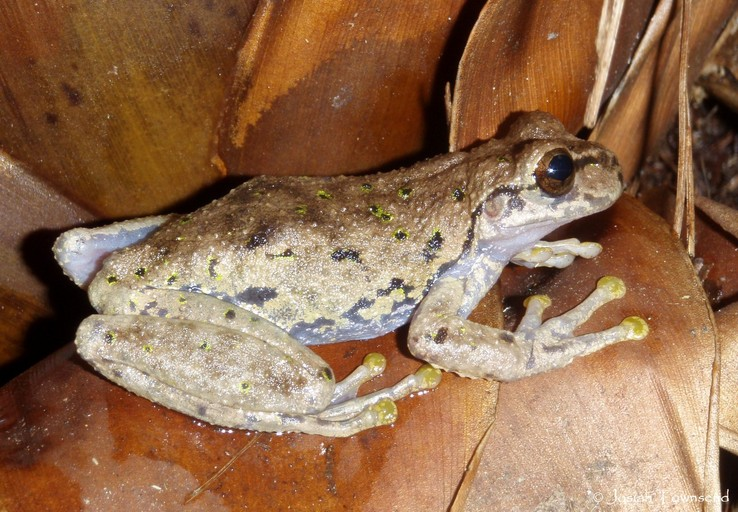
- Plectrohyla dasypus

Scientific classification
- Kingdom: Animalia
- Phylum: Chordata
- Class: Amphibia
- Order: Anura
- Family: Hylidae
- Subfamily: Hylinae
- Genus: Plectrohyla; Brocchi, 1877

Species
- See text.

= Spikethumb frog =

Spikethumb frogs

Genus of amphibians

Spikethumb frogs are a genus (Plectrohyla) of frogs in the family Hylidae found in Central America from southern Mexico through Guatemala and northern El Salvador to central and northern Honduras. A major revision of the Hylidae moved an additional 21 species to this genus from the genus Hyla. The additional species moved to Plectrohyla were identified as the Hyla bistincta group, also called the Plectrohyla bistincta group; a separate group from the initial Plectrohyla guatemalensis group. This phylogenetic classification was later revised by moving the Plectrohyla bistincta group from the genus Plectrohyla into a new genus called Sarcohyla. Meanwhile, the guatemalensis group remained in Plectrohyla. They are called spikethumb because of the spike on their thumbs, which is called a prepollex. The genus name comes from the Greek word plēktron ("spur") and hyla (the genus in which it was formerly placed).

== Species ==
The following species are recognized in the genus Plectrohyla:

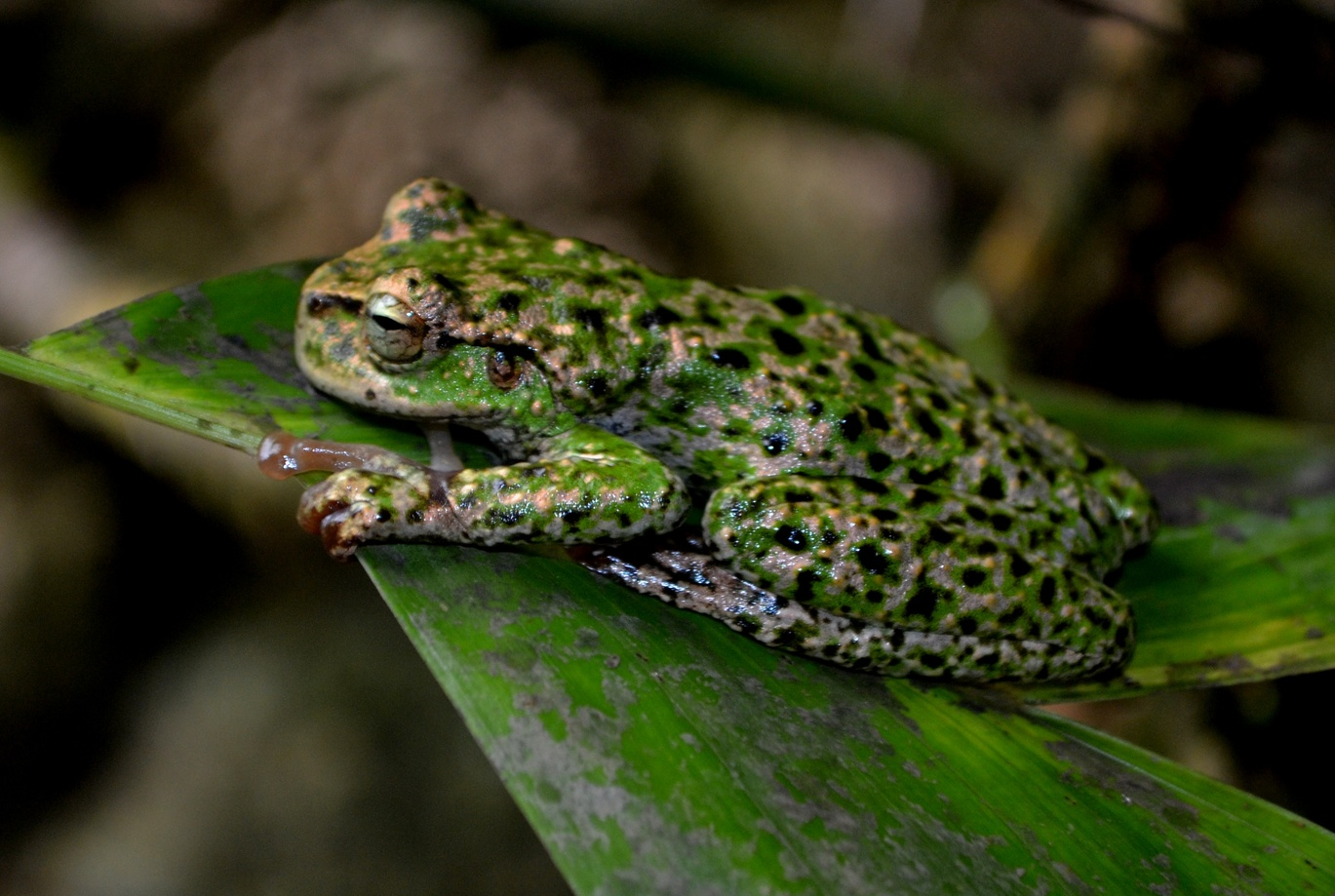
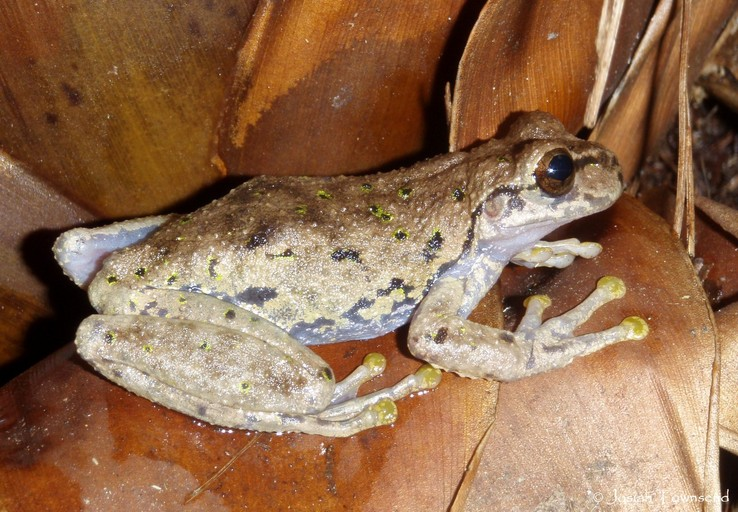
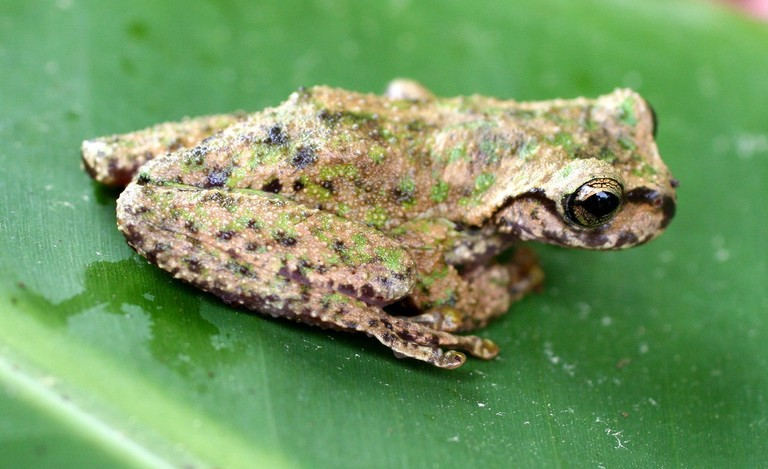
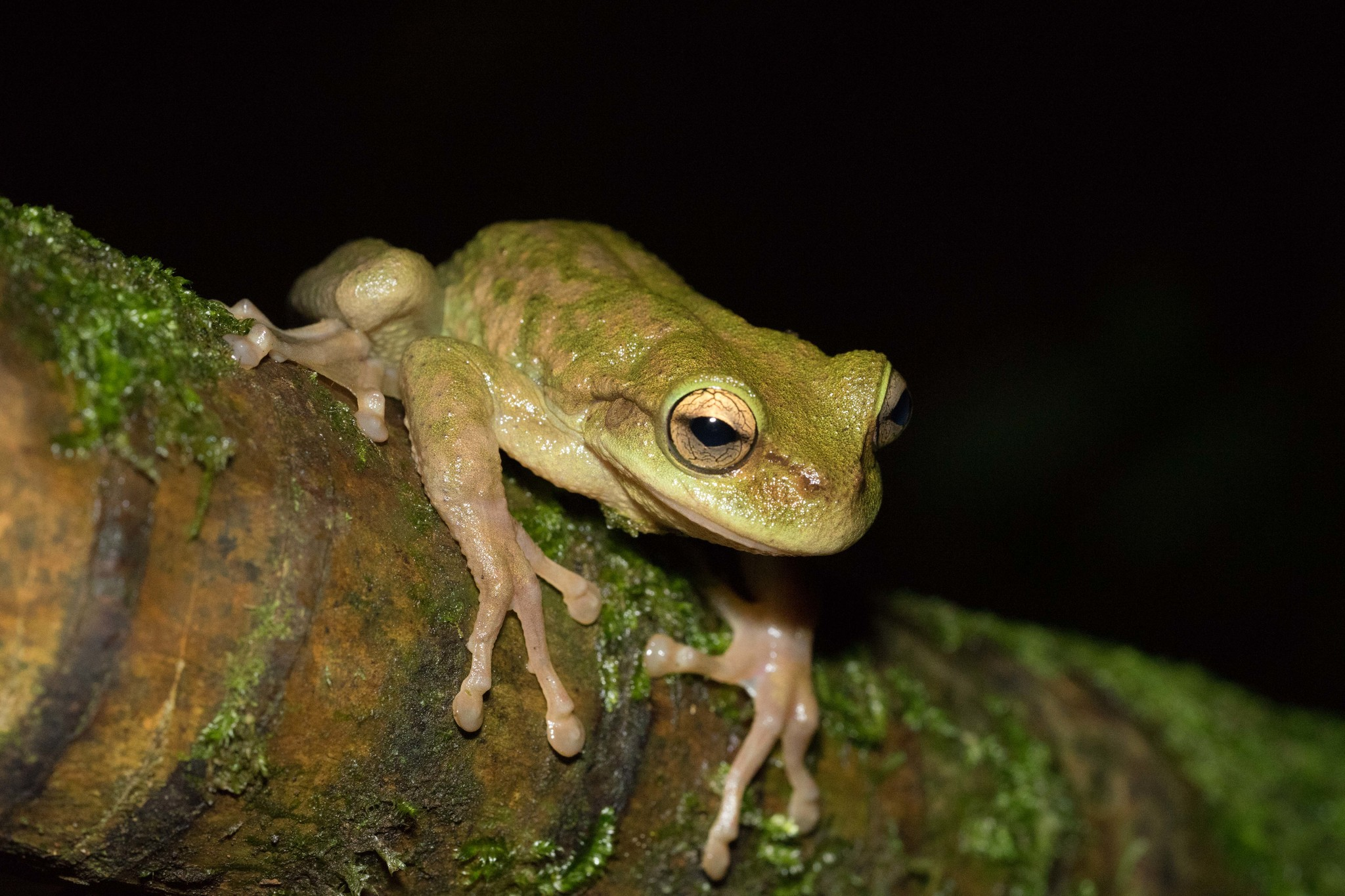
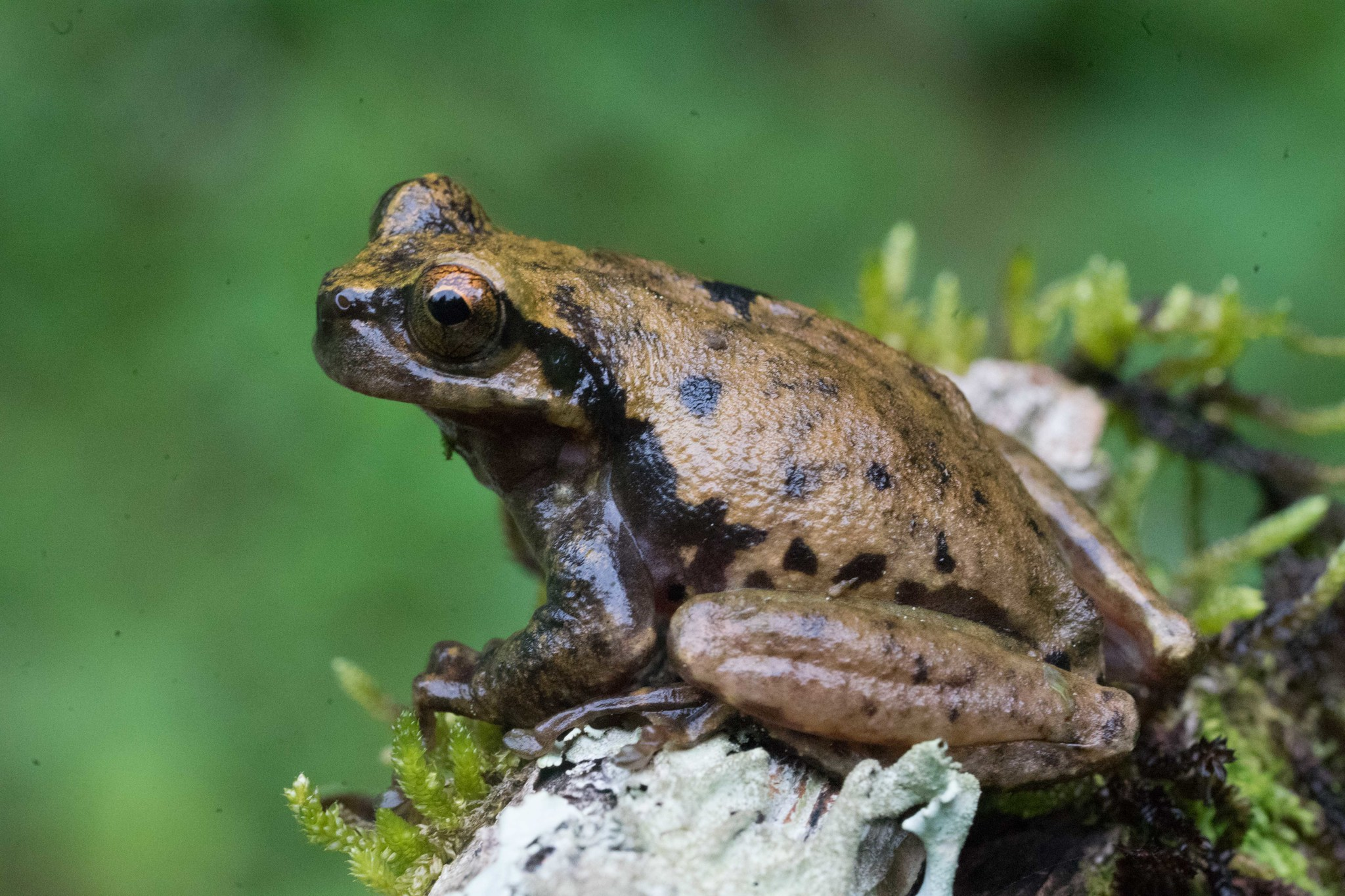
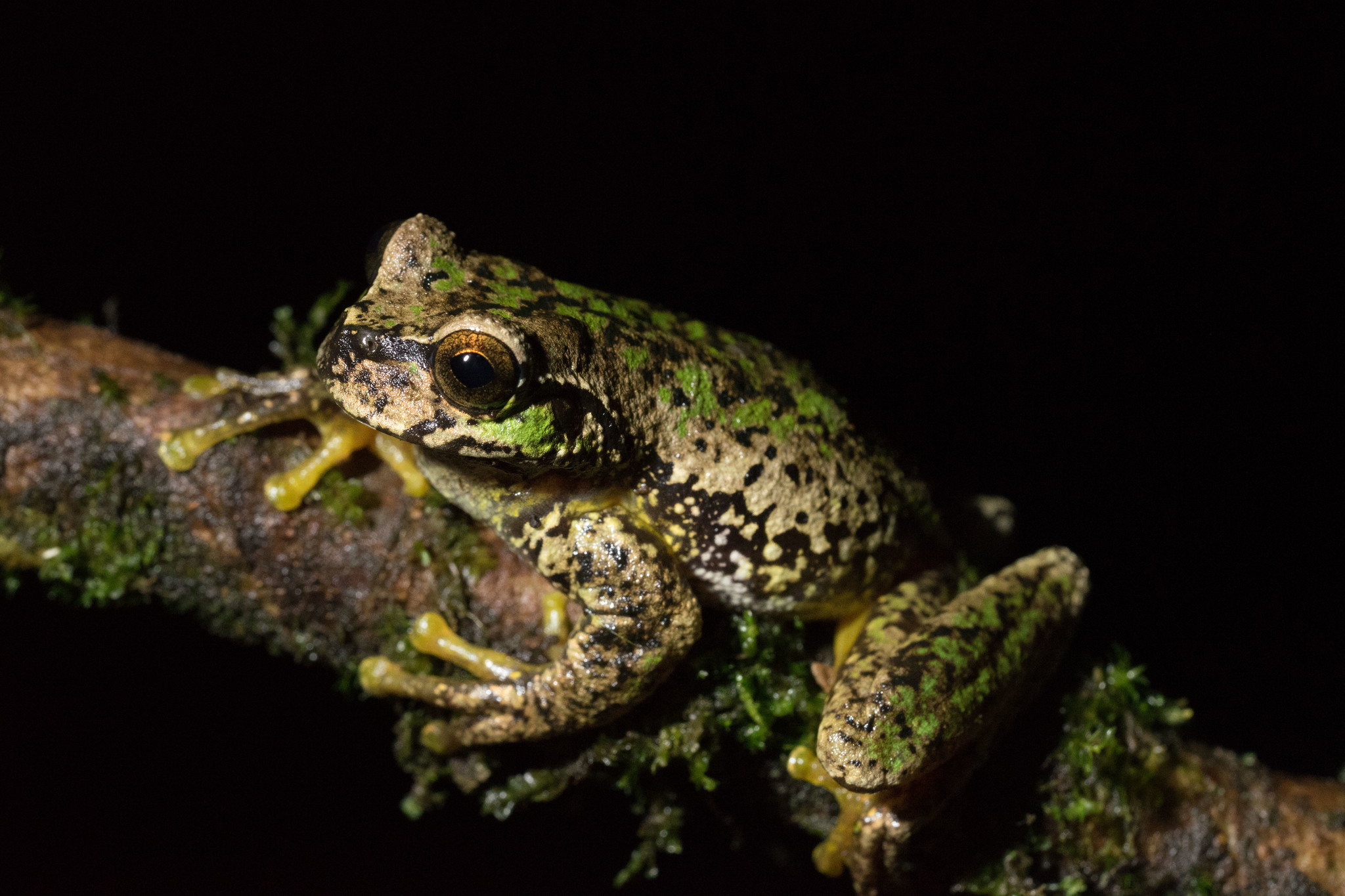
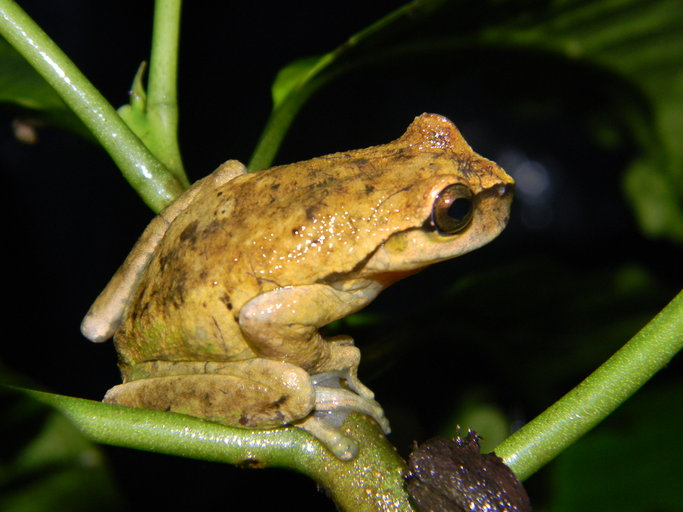
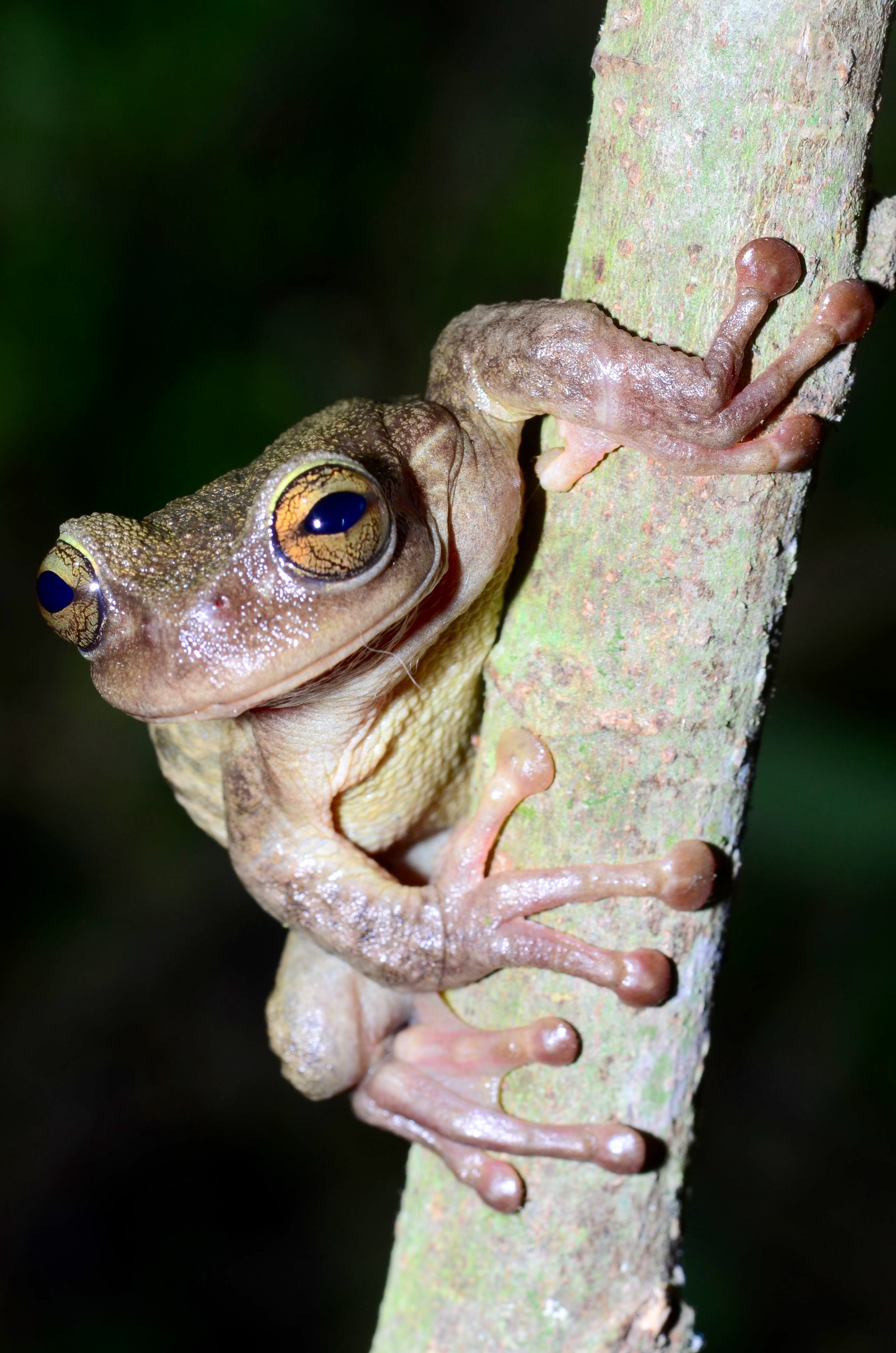
Image	Binomial name and author	Common name
	Plectrohyla acanthodes (Duellman and Campbell, 1992)	Thorny spikethumb frog
	Plectrohyla avia (Stuart, 1952)	Greater spikethumb frog
	Plectrohyla calvata (McCranie, 2017)
	Plectrohyla chrysopleura (Wilson, McCranie & Cruz-Díaz, 1994)
	Plectrohyla dasypus (McCranie & Wilson, 1981)	Honduras spikethumb frog
	Plectrohyla exquisita (McCranie & Wilson, 1998)
	Plectrohyla glandulosa (Boulenger, 1883)	Forest spikethumb frog
	Plectrohyla guatemalensis (Brocchi, 1877)	Guatemala spikethumb frog
	Plectrohyla hartwegi (Duellman, 1968)	Hartweg's spikethumb frog
	Plectrohyla hazelae (Taylor, 1940)	Hazel's tree frog
	Plectrohyla ixil (Stuart, 1942)	Ixil spikethumb frog
	Plectrohyla lacertosa (Bumzahem & Smith, 1954)	Pop-eyed spikethumb frog
	Plectrohyla matudai (Hartweg, 1941)	Matuda's spikethumb frog
	Plectrohyla pokomchi (Duellman & Campbell, 1984)	Rio Sananja spikethumb frog
	Plectrohyla psiloderma (McCranie & Wilson, 1999)
	Plectrohyla pycnochila (Rabb, 1959)	Thick-lipped spikethumb frog
	Plectrohyla quecchi (Stuart, 1942)	Las Palmas spikethumb frog
	Plectrohyla sagorum (Hartweg, 1941)	Arcane spikethumb frog
	Plectrohyla tecunumani (Duellman & Campbell, 1984)	Cave spikethumb frog
	Plectrohyla teuchestes (Duellman & Campbell, 1992)	Alta Verapaz spikethumb frog

== Appearance ==
Spikethumb frogs range from 44 to 90 mm in adults, and have thick, glandular skin. Coloration ranges between shades of green, brown, and red. Plectrohyla have an enlarged prepollex, which is a rudimentary additional digit near the thumb, that contains a sharp projecting spine. The premaxilla is a bone in the anterior portion of the skull that has a bony outgrowth called the alary process, which projects posteriorly and divides into two branches. Secondary sex characteristics in males include elongated premaxillary and maxillary teeth, in addition to swelling of the upper lip during breeding.

== Habitat ==
The genus Plectrohyla inhabit cold streams and ravines in montane and cloud forests. Characteristics of these streams include many rocks, crevices, small waterfalls, and a current to maintain water oxygenation levels. Species of Plectrohyla remain near these streams year-round, often utilizing the same rock crevices for feeding and reproduction.

== Reproduction ==
During copulation, external fertilization is exhibited. As a female spikethumb frog releases her eggs into the water, an amplectant male fertilizes her eggs. Axillary amplexus is the process in which a male positions itself on the back of a female, using its arms to encircle the female's body, so that it can fertilize the female's eggs as they are released. These fertilized eggs then develop along the edges and base of the mating site.

=== Male-male competition ===
Male spikethumb frogs of some species, such as P. guatemalensis, are often found calling from the crevices between rocks of streams. They utilize the same location along a stream for extended periods of time, where they can call for females, mate with females, and guard their fertilized eggs. The vocalizations of males have been recorded, however further research is required to determine whether vocalizations are used for displaying aggression towards nearby males. Vocalization is not universal amongst males in the genus however, as P. Hartwegi lack vocal sacs and vocal slits.

Research suggests that males engage in male-male combat to maintain control of their mating sites, located within the crevices between rocks, as mating sites are likely a limiting resource. The prepollex may be used during this combat, leaving scars on the head and forelimbs of males. These scars are not observed on females.

=== Copulation ===
Spikethumb frogs reproduce in streams using axillary amplexus, a process that can take hours or days. Male spikethumb frogs display two secondary sexual characteristics that are used during reproduction. These include swollen upper lips and long premaxillary and maxillary teeth that protrude down beyond the lip. The upper lip of females contains ordinary mucous glands, and these differ from the glands in the male's upper lip, which largely contains specialized mucous glands, also called breeding glands. Ordinary glands are often found equally distributed throughout the body, which differ from specialized glands that are specifically located, often to perform a specific function.

In Plectrohyla, the specialized mucous glands in the lips of males produce sodefrin precursor-like factors (SPF), which function as allohormones. Allohormones are substances that are directly transmitted from one individual to another, circumventing the special senses, and can have various effects on copulation, including increased female receptivity, inhibition of remating, and altered sperm storage in females. Male spikethumb frogs deliver allohormones via tramautic mating, in which the male presses its swollen upper lip and protruding premaxillary and maxillary teeth into the back of the female, leaving scratches on the female's back. These scratches allow for direct transmission of the SPF allohormone into the bloodstream of the female, preventing loss to the environment. These differ from pheromones, which are released into the environment and detected via the special senses. Upon transmission into the bloodstream, SPF allohormones function by shortening courtship duration, however the exact effect of SPF allohormones on the physiological and behavioral changes to the female have not been determined. Shortened courtship duration reduces risks of predation during copulation, increasing fitness.

This copulatory mechanism resembles the condition of the plethodontid salamander, in which males use their elongated teeth to scratch the backs of females to deliver allohormones directly from the mental glands on their chin. These allohormones increase female receptivity, which results in increased probability that the female will accept the male's sperm.
