= Matudina =

Scientific classification
- Kingdom: Plantae
- Clade: Tracheophytes
- Clade: Angiosperms
- Clade: Eudicots
- Clade: Asterids
- Order: Asterales
- Family: Asteraceae
- Subfamily: Asteroideae
- Tribe: Eupatorieae
- Genus: Matudina; R.M.King & H.Rob.
- Species: M. corvi

Binomial name
- Matudina corvi (McVaugh) R.M.King & H.Rob.

Genus of flowering plants

Matudina is a genus of flowering plants in the tribe Eupatorieae within the family Asteraceae.

The genus is named for Dr. Eizi Matuda (1894-1978) of the Universidad Nacional Autónoma de México. There is only one known species, Matudina corvi, native to the State of Chiapas in southern Mexico
