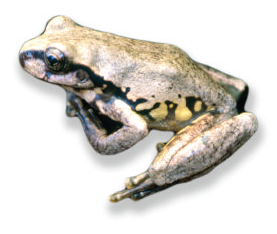
- Specimen representing lineage 3 of Zarza and colleagues
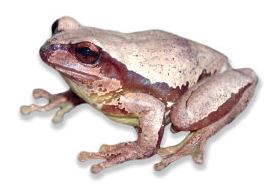
- Specimen representing lineage 7 of Zarza and colleagues

Conservation status
- Least Concern (IUCN 3.1)

Scientific classification
- Kingdom: Animalia
- Phylum: Chordata
- Class: Amphibia
- Order: Anura
- Family: Hylidae
- Genus: Sarcohyla
- Species: S. bistincta

Binomial name
- Sarcohyla bistincta (Cope, 1877)

Synonyms
- Hyla bistincta Cope, 1877; Plectrohyla bistincta (Cope, 1877)

= Sarcohyla bistincta =

Species of frog

Sarcohyla bistincta, also known as the Mexican fringe-limbed treefrog or Cope's streamside treefrog, is a species of frog in the family Hylidae. It is endemic to Mexico; it is widespread and occurs from southern Sinaloa and Durango southeastward to Veracruz and Oaxaca. The nominal Sarcohyla bistincta consists of several lineages that may eventually be described as distinct species.

== Description ==
Males grow to a snout–vent length of 57 mm (2.2 in) and females to 60 mm (2.4 in). The head is wider than it is long; the snout is short and rounded. The tympanum is distinct but partly obscured by the supratympanic fold. The fingers are moderately long and slender and bear moderately large discs; only vestigial webbing is present. The toes are moderately long and slender too and bear discs that are slightly smaller than the finger ones. The toes are partially webbed. Skin is dorsally smooth but ventrally granular. Dorsal coloration varies from yellowish brown to dark brown (juveniles in some populations are greenish); the flanks are yellow to pale brownish tan with pattern of coarse dark brown to black anastomosing lines. The thighs are posteriorly blackish with bold yellow spots, with the yellow spotting also present on the anterior surface. The ventral surfaces are usually uniform pale yellow, but occasionally with sparse dark vermiform mottling, especially on throat and chest. The iris is deep reddish bronze.

== Habitat and conservation ==
Sarcohyla bistincta occurs in pine-oak and pine-fir forests at elevations of 1,219–2,900 m (3,999–9,514 ft) above sea level and in the associated streams. They are often found sitting on large streamside boulders or on vegetation or exposed tree roots, but can also be found far from flowing water. Breeding takes place in streams. It is threatened by habitat loss and potentially also by chytridiomycosis. Its range includes some protected areas.
