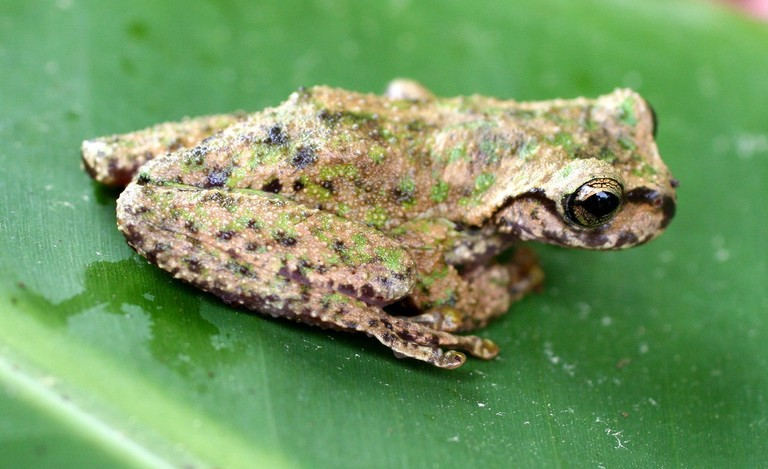

Conservation status
- Near Threatened (IUCN 3.1)

Scientific classification
- Kingdom: Animalia
- Phylum: Chordata
- Class: Amphibia
- Order: Anura
- Family: Hylidae
- Genus: Plectrohyla
- Species: P. guatemalensis

Binomial name
- Plectrohyla guatemalensis Brocchi, 1877

Synonyms
- Hyla guatemalensis (Brocchi, 1877)

= Plectrohyla guatemalensis =

Species of amphibian

Plectrohyla guatemalensis, also known as the Guatemala spikethumb frog, is a species of frog in the family Hylidae. It occurs in the highlands of the Sierra Madre from southeastern Chiapas, Mexico, and eastward through the central and southwestern highlands of Guatemala to northwestern El Salvador as well as the Sierra de Nombre de Dios in north-central Honduras. It might be a composite of more than one species.

== Description ==
Males measure 40–52 mm (1.6–2.0 in) and females 42–54 mm (1.7–2.1 in) in snout–vent length. The body is moderately robust. The head is slightly wider than long and as wide as the body; the snout is short. The eyes are large. The heavy supra-tympanic fold covers the upper third of the tympanum. The dorsal coloration varies from dark green (with or without reddish brown spots) to reddish brown (with or without dark brown spots and green flecks). The prepollex (the "spikethumb") in males is massive and bifid.

== Habitat and conservation ==
Plectrohyla guatemalensis occurs in cloud forests and premontane and lower montane forests at elevations of 900–2,800 m (3,000–9,200 ft) above sea level. It is associated with cascading mountain streams, its breeding habitat. Males often vocalize from inside crevices in rocks in the streams to attract females, which lay their eggs there and have them fertilized by the male. At daytime, specimens have been collected in the axils of bromeliads and in crevices along stream banks. At night, they have been found on limbs overhanging streams and on boulders in streams.

The species used to be relatively common in El Salvador, Guatemala, and Honduras, but is now relatively common in Honduras only. It has not been recorded in Mexico since 1944, despite surveys. Its decline in recent years is likely caused by chytridiomycosis, but also habitat loss is a major threat. It occurs in several protected areas.

== Distribution ==
Plectrohyla guatemalensis habits in high-elevation mountain chains across Central America, ranging from southeastern Mexico down through Central America to northern Nicaragua.
