= Sarcohyla siopela =

Conservation status
- Critically Endangered (IUCN 3.1)

Scientific classification
- Kingdom: Animalia
- Phylum: Chordata
- Class: Amphibia
- Order: Anura
- Family: Hylidae
- Genus: Sarcohyla
- Species: S. siopela

Binomial name
- Sarcohyla siopela (Duellman, 1968)

Synonyms
- Hyla siopela Duellman, 1968; Plectrohyla siopela (Duellman, 1968)

Species of frog

Sarcohyla siopela, also known as the voiceless treefrog or mute treefrog, is a species of frog in the family Hylidae. It is endemic to Mexico and only known from the west slope of the Cofre de Perote Mountain, in Sierra Madre Oriental, central Veracruz. It is feared that the species might be extinct.

== Etymology ==
The specific name siopela is derived from the Greek siopelos, which means "silent" and refers to the lack of a voice in this species.

== Description ==
Adult males measure 47–50 mm (1.9–2.0 in) and females 45–53 mm (1.8–2.1 in) in snout–vent length. The snout is truncate. The tympanum is partly concealed and indistinct. The fingers have vestigial webbing whereas the toes are moderately webbed. The dorsum is pale green to olive green, with darker green or black flecks or reticulations, or pinkish tan in color, carrying dark brown or black flecks or reticulations. Juveniles are uniform pale green. Males have prepollex (the "spikethumb") that is large and flat and bears small nuptial spines. They lack vocal slits and appear to be mute.

== Habitat and conservation ==
The natural habitats of this species dry pine forest where it is found only in mountain streams in crevices and rocks. It is known from elevations between 2,500 and 2,550 m (8,200 and 8,370 ft) above sea level. At night, these frogs were found sitting on rocks and branches in the spray of cascades. By day, they were found in crevices and under rocks behind small cascades.

Sarcohyla siopela used to be abundant, but, as of 2010, had not been seen for more 10 years, in spite of surveys in suitable habitats in the area of the type locality. The specific stream from where it was first found has dried up because the water has been diverted elsewhere. Its apparent disappearance from the remaining suitable habitat suggests that chytridiomycosis might also be at play. The range is within the Cofre de Perote National Park.
