= Janalee P. Caldwell =

American herpetologist

- Born: Missouri
- Education: University of Kansas (Ph.D. 1974)
- Spouse: Laurie J. Vitt
- Scientific career
- Fields: Herpetology
- Doctoral advisor: William E. Duellman

Janalee P. Caldwell is an American herpetologist at the University of Oklahoma. Her research is focused on the ecology and behavior of tropical amphibians.

== Education and career ==
Caldwell was born in Missouri and raised in Oklahoma. She is a member of the Cherokee Nation. Caldwell received her Ph.D. in ecology from the University of Kansas in 1974, with a dissertation entitled "Tropical Tree Frog communities: Patterns of reproduction, size & utilization of structural habitat."

Calwell was the Curator of Amphibians at the Sam Noble Oklahoma Museum of Natural History, where she is currently Professor Emeritus and Curator Emeritus. She served as president of the Society for the Study of Amphibians and Reptiles from 2001–2002. In 1997, she was featured in Wonderwise, which was an educational science kit that featured women in science developed by Nebraska Educational Television Network and University of Nebraska State Museum.

Caldwell is co-author of Herpetology: An Introductory Biology of Amphibians and Reptiles, Fourth Edition, with her husband Laurie J. Vitt.
