= List of amphibians of Mexico =

This is a list of amphibians found in Mexico. A total of 366 amphibian species have been recorded in Mexico, 3 of which are extinct. This list is derived from the database listing of AmphibiaWeb.

== Caecilians (Gymnophiona) ==
=== Dermophiidae ===
Order: Gymnophiona. Family: Dermophiidae

- Dermophis mexicanus (VU)
- Dermophis oaxacae (DD)

== Salamanders (Caudata) ==
=== Ambystomatidae ===
Order: Caudata. Family: Ambystomatidae

- Ambystoma altamirani (EN)
- Ambystoma amblycephalum (CR)
- Ambystoma andersoni (CR)
- Ambystoma bombypellum (CR)
- Ambystoma dumerilii (CR)
- Ambystoma flavipiperatum (DD)
- Ambystoma granulosum (CR)
- Ambystoma leorae (CR)
- Ambystoma lermaense (CR)
- Ambystoma mexicanum (CR)
- Ambystoma ordinarium (EN)
- Ambystoma rivulare (DD)
- Ambystoma rosaceum (LC)
- Ambystoma silvense (DD)
- Ambystoma taylori (CR)
- Ambystoma tigrinum (LC)
- Ambystoma velasci (LC)

=== Plethodontidae ===
Order: Caudata. Family: Plethodontidae

- Aneides lugubris (LC)
- Batrachoseps major (LC)
- Bolitoglossa alberchi (LC)
- Bolitoglossa chinanteca
- Bolitoglossa flavimembris (EN)
- Bolitoglossa flaviventris (EN)
- Bolitoglossa franklini (EN)
- Bolitoglossa hartwegi (NT)
- Bolitoglossa hermosa (NT)
- Bolitoglossa lincolni (NT)
- Bolitoglossa macrinii (NT)
- Bolitoglossa mexicana (LC)
- Bolitoglossa oaxacensis (DD)
- Bolitoglossa occidentalis (LC)
- Bolitoglossa platydactyla (NT)
- Bolitoglossa riletti (EN)
- Bolitoglossa rostrata (VU)
- Bolitoglossa rufescens (LC)
- Bolitoglossa stuarti (DD)
- Bolitoglossa veracrucis (EN)
- Bolitoglossa yucatana (LC)
- Bolitoglossa zapoteca (DD)
- Chiropterotriton arboreus (CR)
- Chiropterotriton chiropterus (CR)
- Chiropterotriton chondrostega (EN)
- Chiropterotriton cracens (EN)
- Chiropterotriton dimidiatus (EN)
- Chiropterotriton lavae (CR)
- Chiropterotriton magnipes (CR)
- Chiropterotriton mosaueri (DD)
- Chiropterotriton multidentatus (EN)
- Chiropterotriton orculus (VU)
- Chiropterotriton priscus (NT)
- Chiropterotriton terrestris (CR)
- Cryptotriton adelos (EN)
- Cryptotriton alvarezdeltoroi (EN)
- Dendrotriton megarhinus (VU)
- Dendrotriton xolocalcae (VU)
- Ensatina eschscholtzii (LC)
- Ixalotriton niger (CR)
- Ixalotriton parvus (CR)
- Nyctanolis pernix (EN)
- Oedipina elongata (LC)
- Parvimolge townsendi (CR)
- Pseudoeurycea ahuitzotl (CR)
- Pseudoeurycea altamontana (EN)
- Pseudoeurycea amuzga (DD)
- Pseudoeurycea anitae (CR)
- Pseudoeurycea aquatica (CR)
- Pseudoeurycea aurantia (VU)
- Pseudoeurycea bellii (VU)
- Pseudoeurycea boneti (VU)
- Pseudoeurycea brunnata (CR)
- Pseudoeurycea cafetalera
- Pseudoeurycea cephalica (NT)
- Pseudoeurycea cochranae (EN)
- Pseudoeurycea conanti (EN)
- Pseudoeurycea firscheini (EN)
- Pseudoeurycea gadovii (EN)
- Pseudoeurycea galeanae (NT)
- Pseudoeurycea gigantea (CR)
- Pseudoeurycea goebeli (CR)
- Pseudoeurycea juarezi (CR)
- Pseudoeurycea leprosa (VU)
- Pseudoeurycea lineola (EN)
- Pseudoeurycea longicauda (EN)
- Pseudoeurycea lynchi (CR)
- Pseudoeurycea maxima (DD)
- Pseudoeurycea melanomolga (EN)
- Pseudoeurycea mixcoatl (DD)
- Pseudoeurycea mixteca (LC)
- Pseudoeurycea mystax (EN)
- Pseudoeurycea naucampatepetl (CR)
- Pseudoeurycea nigromaculata (CR)
- Pseudoeurycea obesa (DD)
- Pseudoeurycea orchileucos (EN)
- Pseudoeurycea orchimelas (EN)
- Pseudoeurycea papenfussi (NT)
- Pseudoeurycea praecellens (CR)
- Pseudoeurycea quetzalanensis (DD)
- Pseudoeurycea robertsi (CR)
- Pseudoeurycea ruficauda (DD)
- Pseudoeurycea saltator (CR)
- Pseudoeurycea scandens (VU)
- Pseudoeurycea smithi (CR)
- Pseudoeurycea tenchalli (EN)
- Pseudoeurycea teotepec (EN)
- Pseudoeurycea tlahcuiloh (CR)
- Pseudoeurycea tlilicxitl (DD)
- Pseudoeurycea unguidentis (CR)
- Pseudoeurycea werleri (EN)
- Thorius arboreus (EN)
- Thorius aureus (CR)
- Thorius boreas (EN)
- Thorius dubitus (EN)
- Thorius grandis (EN)
- Thorius infernalis (CR)
- Thorius insperatus (DD)
- Thorius lunaris (EN)
- Thorius macdougalli (VU)
- Thorius magnipes (CR)
- Thorius minutissimus (CR)
- Thorius minydemus (CR)
- Thorius munificus (CR)
- Thorius narismagnus (CR)
- Thorius narisovalis (CR)
- Thorius omiltemi (EN)
- Thorius papaloae (EN)
- Thorius pennatulus (CR)
- Thorius pulmonaris (EN)
- Thorius schmidti (EN)
- Thorius smithi (CR)
- Thorius spilogaster (CR)
- Thorius troglodytes (EN)

=== Salamandridae ===
Order: Caudata. Family: Salamandridae

- Notophthalmus meridionalis (EN)

=== Sirenidae ===
Order: Caudata. Family: Sirenidae

- Siren intermedia (LC)

== Frogs and Toads (Anura) ==
=== Bufonidae ===
Order: Anura. Family: Bufonidae

- Anaxyrus boreas (NT)
- Anaxyrus californicus (EN)
- Anaxyrus cognatus (LC)
- Anaxyrus compactilis (LC)
- Anaxyrus debilis (LC)
- Anaxyrus kelloggi (LC)
- Anaxyrus mexicanus (NT)
- Anaxyrus microscaphus (LC)
- Anaxyrus punctatus (LC)
- Anaxyrus retiformis (LC)
- Anaxyrus speciosus (LC)
- Anaxyrus woodhousii (LC)
- Incilius alvarius (LC)
- Incilius bocourti (LC)
- Incilius campbelli (NT)
- Incilius canaliferus (LC)
- Incilius cavifrons (EN)
- Incilius coccifer (LC)
- Incilius cristatus (CR)
- Incilius cycladen (VU)
- Incilius gemmifer (EN)
- Incilius macrocristatus (VU)
- Incilius marmoreus (LC)
- Incilius mazatlanensis (LC)
- Incilius mccoyi
- Incilius nebulifer (LC)
- Incilius occidentalis (LC)
- Incilius perplexus (EN)
- Incilius pisinnus (DD)
- Incilius spiculatus (EN)
- Incilius tacanensis (EN)
- Incilius tutelarius (EN)
- Incilius valliceps (LC)
- Rhinella marina (LC)

=== Centrolenidae ===
Order: Anura. Family: Centrolenidae

- Hyalinobatrachium fleischmanni (LC)

=== Craugastoridae ===
Order: Anura. Family: Craugastoridae

- Craugastor alfredi (VU)
- Craugastor augusti (LC)
- Craugastor batrachylus (DD)
- Craugastor berkenbuschii (NT)
- Craugastor brocchi (VU)
- Craugastor decoratus (VU)
- Craugastor galacticorhinus
- Craugastor glaucus (CR)
- Craugastor greggi (CR)
- Craugastor guerreroensis (CR)
- Craugastor hobartsmithi (EN)
- Craugastor laticeps (NT)
- Craugastor lineatus (CR)
- Craugastor loki (LC)
- Craugastor matudai (VU)
- Craugastor megalotympanum (CR)
- Craugastor mexicanus (LC)
- Craugastor occidentalis (DD)
- Craugastor omiltemanus (EN)
- Craugastor palenque (DD)
- Craugastor polymniae (CR)
- Craugastor pozo (CR)
- Craugastor pygmaeus (VU)
- Craugastor rhodopis (VU)
- Craugastor rugulosus (LC)
- Craugastor saltator
- Craugastor sartori
- Craugastor silvicola (EN)
- Craugastor spatulatus (EN)
- Craugastor stuarti (EN)
- Craugastor tarahumaraensis (VU)
- Craugastor taylori (DD)
- Craugastor uno (EN)
- Craugastor vocalis (LC)
- Craugastor vulcani (EN)
- Craugastor yucatanensis (NT)

=== Eleutherodactylidae ===
Order: Anura. Family: Eleutherodactylidae

- Eleutherodactylus angustidigitorum (VU)
- Eleutherodactylus cystignathoides (LC)
- Eleutherodactylus dennisi (EN)
- Eleutherodactylus dilatus (EN)
- Eleutherodactylus dixoni (CR)
- Eleutherodactylus grandis (CR)
- Eleutherodactylus guttilatus (LC)
- Eleutherodactylus interorbitalis (DD)
- Eleutherodactylus leprus (VU)
- Eleutherodactylus longipes (VU)
- Eleutherodactylus maurus (DD)
- Eleutherodactylus modestus (VU)
- Eleutherodactylus nitidus (LC)
- Eleutherodactylus nivicolimae (VU)
- Eleutherodactylus pallidus (DD)
- Eleutherodactylus pipilans (LC)
- Eleutherodactylus planirostris (LC)
- Eleutherodactylus rubrimaculatus (VU)
- Eleutherodactylus rufescens (CR)
- Eleutherodactylus saxatilis (EN)
- Eleutherodactylus syristes (EN)
- Eleutherodactylus teretistes (DD)
- Eleutherodactylus verrucipes (VU)
- Eleutherodactylus verruculatus (DD)

=== Hylidae ===
Order: Anura. Family: Hylidae

- Acris blanchardi
- Agalychnis callidryas (LC)
- Agalychnis moreletii (CR)
- Anotheca spinosa (LC)
- Bromeliohyla dendroscarta (CR)
- Charadrahyla altipotens (CR)
- Charadrahyla chaneque (EN)
- Charadrahyla nephila (VU)
- Charadrahyla taeniopus (VU)
- Charadrahyla tecuani
- Charadrahylaa trux (CR)
- Dendropsophus ebraccatus (LC)
- Dendropsophus microcephalus (LC)
- Dendropsophus robertmertensi (LC)
- Dendropsophus sartori (LC)
- Duellmanohyla chamulae (EN)
- Duellmanohyla ignicolor (EN)
- Duellmanohyla schmidtorum (VU)
- Ecnomiohyla echinata (CR)
- Ecnomiohyla miotympanum (NT)
- Ecnomiohyla valancifer (CR)
- Exerodonta abdivita (DD)
- Exerodonta bivocata (DD)
- Exerodonta chimalapa (EN)
- Exerodonta juanitae (VU)
- Exerodonta melanomma (VU)
- Exerodonta pinorum (VU)
- Exerodonta smaragdina (LC)
- Exerodonta sumichrasti (LC)
- Exerodonta xera (VU)
- Hyla arboricola (DD)
- Hyla arenicolor (LC)
- Hyla euphorbiacea (NT)
- Hyla eximia (LC)
- Hyla plicata (LC)
- Hyla walkeri (VU)
- Hyla wrightorum (LC)
- Megastomatohyla mixe (CR)
- Megastomatohyla mixomaculata (EN)
- Megastomatohyla nubicola (EN)
- Megastomatohyla pellita (CR)
- Pachymedusa dacnicolor (LC)
- Plectrohyla acanthodes (CR)
- Plectrohyla ameibothalame (DD)
- Plectrohyla arborescandens (EN)
- Plectrohyla avia (CR)
- Plectrohyla bistincta (LC)
- Plectrohyla calthula (CR)
- Plectrohyla calvicollina (CR)
- Plectrohyla celata (CR)
- Plectrohyla cembra (CR)
- Plectrohyla charadricola (EN)
- Plectrohyla chryses (CR)
- Plectrohyla crassa (CR)
- Plectrohyla cyanomma (CR)
- Plectrohyla cyclada (EN)
- Plectrohyla ephemera (CR)
- Plectrohyla guatemalensis (CR)
- Plectrohyla hartwegi (CR)
- Plectrohyla hazelae (CR)
- Plectrohyla ixil (CR)
- Plectrohyla labedactyla (DD)
- Plectrohyla lacertosa (EN)
- Plectrohyla matudai (VU)
- Plectrohyla miahuatlanensis (DD)
- Plectrohyla mykter (EN)
- Plectrohyla pachyderma (CR)
- Plectrohyla pentheter (EN)
- Plectrohyla psarosema (CR)
- Plectrohyla pycnochila (CR)
- Plectrohyla robertsorum (EN)
- Plectrohyla sabrina (CR)
- Plectrohyla sagorum (EN)
- Plectrohyla siopela (CR)
- Plectrohyla thorectes (CR)
- Pseudacris cadaverina (LC)
- Pseudacris clarkii (LC)
- Pseudacris regilla (LC)
- Ptychohyla erythromma (EN)
- Ptychohyla euthysanota (NT)
- Ptychohyla leonhardschultzei (EN)
- Ptychohyla macrotympanum (CR)
- Scinax staufferi (LC)
- Smilisca baudinii (LC)
- Smilisca cyanosticta (NT)
- Smilisca dentata (EN)
- Smilisca fodiens (LC)
- Tlalocohyla godmani (VU)
- Tlalocohyla loquax (LC)
- Tlalocohyla picta (LC)
- Tlalocohyla smithii (LC)
- Trachycephalus venulosus (LC)
- Triprion petasatus (LC)
- Triprion spatulatus (LC)

=== Leptodactylidae ===
Order: Anura. Family: Leptodactylidae

- Engystomops pustulosus (LC)
- Leptodactylus fragilis (LC)
- Leptodactylus melanonotus (LC)

=== Microhylidae ===
Order: Anura. Family: Microhylidae

- Gastrophryne elegans (LC)
- Gastrophryne olivacea (LC)
- Gastrophryne usta (LC)
- Hypopachus barberi (VU)
- Hypopachus variolosus (LC)

=== Pipidae ===
Order: Anura. Family: Pipidae

- Xenopus laevis (LC)

=== Ranidae ===
Order: Anura. Family: Ranidae

- Rana aurora (LC)
- Rana berlandieri (LC)
- Rana boylii (NT)
- Rana brownorum
- Rana catesbeiana (LC)
- Rana chichicuahutla (CR)
- Rana chiricahuensis (VU)
- Rana dunni (EN)
- Rana forreri (LC)
- Rana johni (EN)
- Rana lemosespinali (DD)
- Rana maculata (LC)
- Rana magnaocularis (LC)
- Rana megapoda (VU)
- Rana montezumae (LC)
- Rana neovolcanica (NT)
- Rana omiltemana (CR)
- Rana psilonota (DD)
- Rana pueblae (CR)
- Rana pustulosa (LC)
- Rana sierramadrensis (VU)
- Rana spectabilis (LC)
- Rana tarahumarae (VU)
- Rana tlaloci (CR)
- Rana vaillanti (LC)
- Rana yavapaiensis (LC)
- Rana zweifeli (LC)

=== Rhinophrynidae ===
Order: Anura. Family: Rhinophrynidae

- Rhinophrynus dorsalis (LC)

=== Scaphiopodidae ===
Order: Anura. Family: Scaphiopodidae

- Scaphiopus couchii (LC)
- Spea bombifrons (LC)
- Spea hammondii (NT)
- Spea multiplicata (LC)
