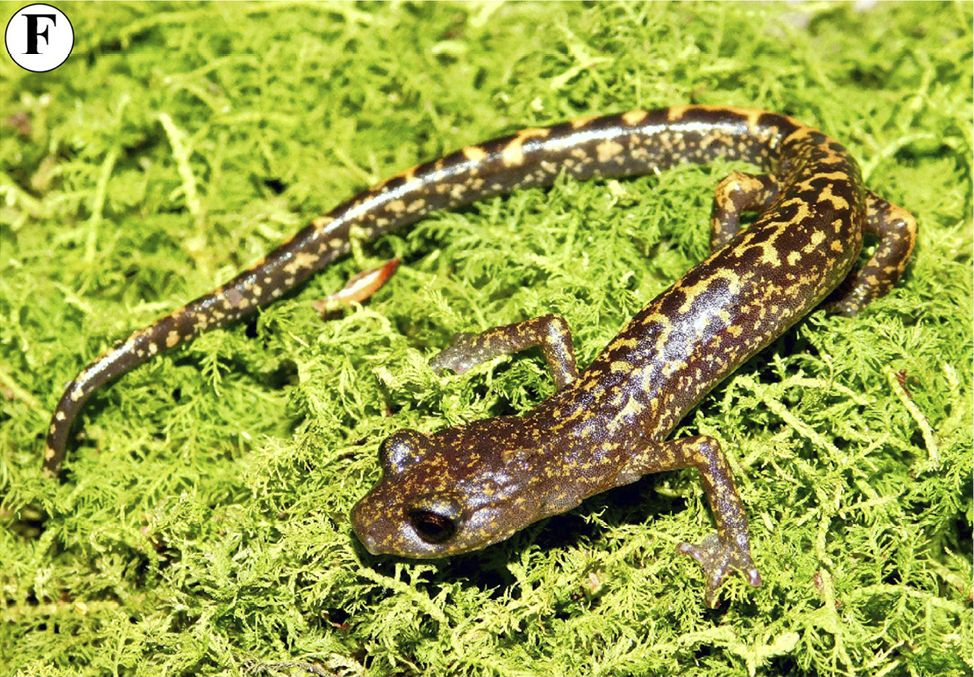

Scientific classification
- Domain: Eukaryota
- Kingdom: Animalia
- Phylum: Chordata
- Class: Amphibia
- Order: Urodela
- Family: Plethodontidae
- Genus: Pseudoeurycea
- Species: P. jaguar

Binomial name
- Pseudoeurycea jaguar Cázares-Hernández et al., 2022

= Pseudoeurycea jaguar =

Species of salamander

Pseudoeurycea jaguar, or the jaguar salamander (Spanish: tlaconete jaguar), is a species of salamander in the family Plethodontidae. It is endemic to Veracruz, Mexico.

== Habitat ==
Its natural habitat is subtropical or tropical dry forests of the Sierra de Zongolica in Veracruz. At its type locality, it was found in Cupressus forests.

== Phylogenetics ==
It is genetically most similar to Pseudoeurycea ruficauda from the Sierra Mazateca of northern Oaxaca, southern Mexico. Both species belong to the Pseudoeurycea juarezi group, which also includes P. saltator and P. aurantia.
