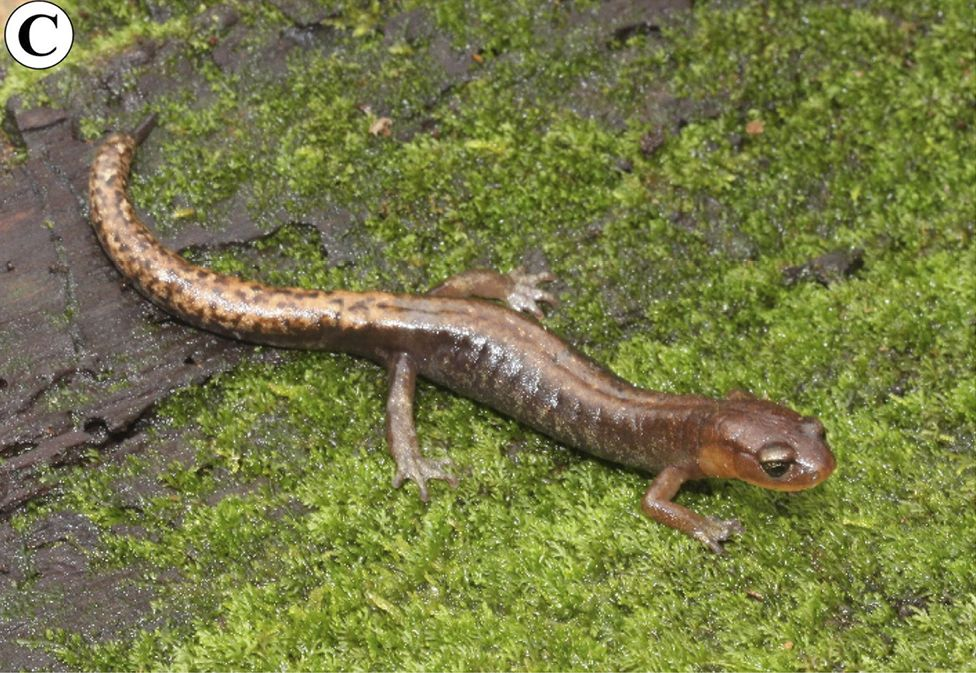

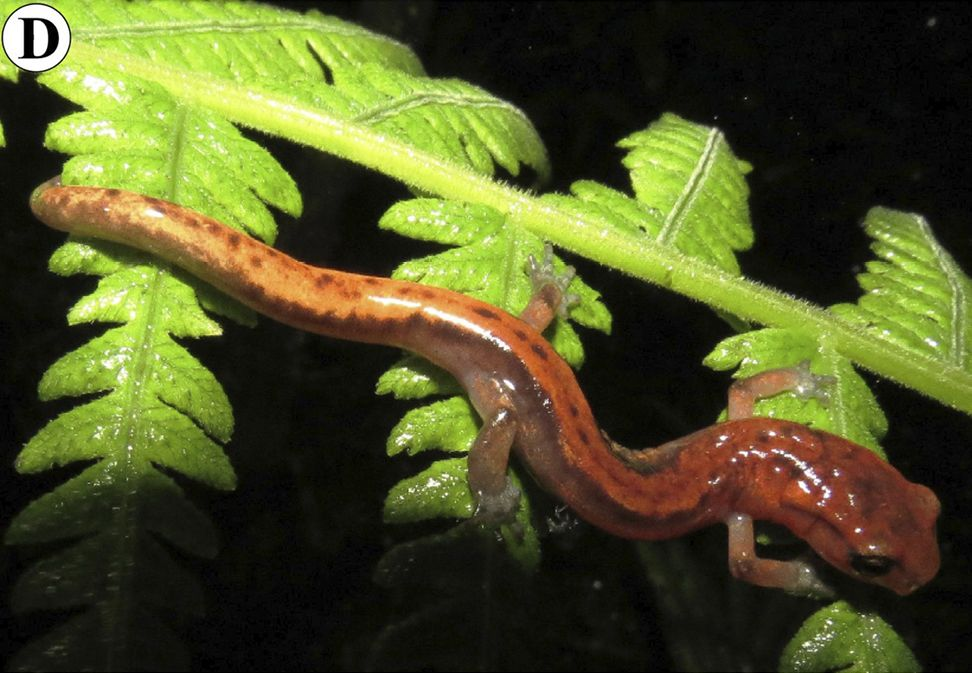
- Two color variants

Conservation status
- Endangered (IUCN 3.1)

Scientific classification
- Kingdom: Animalia
- Phylum: Chordata
- Class: Amphibia
- Order: Urodela
- Family: Plethodontidae
- Genus: Pseudoeurycea
- Species: P. juarezi

Binomial name
- Pseudoeurycea juarezi Regal, 1966

= Pseudoeurycea juarezi =

Species of salamander

Pseudoeurycea juarezi is a species of salamander in the family Plethodontidae, endemic to Mexico.

Its natural habitat is subtropical or tropical moist lowland forests. It is threatened by habitat loss.

Phylogenetically, the species that are more closely related to P. juarezi are, in order of phylogenetic distance, P. saltator, P. aurantia, P. ruficauda, and P. jaguar.
