= Dendrotriton bromeliacius =

Conservation status
- Critically Endangered (IUCN 3.1)

Scientific classification
- Kingdom: Animalia
- Phylum: Chordata
- Class: Amphibia
- Order: Urodela
- Family: Plethodontidae
- Genus: Dendrotriton
- Species: D. bromeliacius

Binomial name
- Dendrotriton bromeliacius (Schmidt, 1936)

Species of amphibian

Dendrotriton bromeliacius is a species of salamander in the family Plethodontidae. It is found in Guatemala.

D. bromeliacius is a sister species to D. rabbi, and is thought to have diverged from it within the Sierra Madre de Chiapas in the past 100,000 years. However, it is no longer found there - Bromeliacius is only found on the slopes of Volcán Tajumulco between the elevations of 1900 meters to 2700 meters, indicating a dispersal from its origin point. Its natural habitat is subtropical or tropical moist montane forests, although it is threatened by habitat loss.
