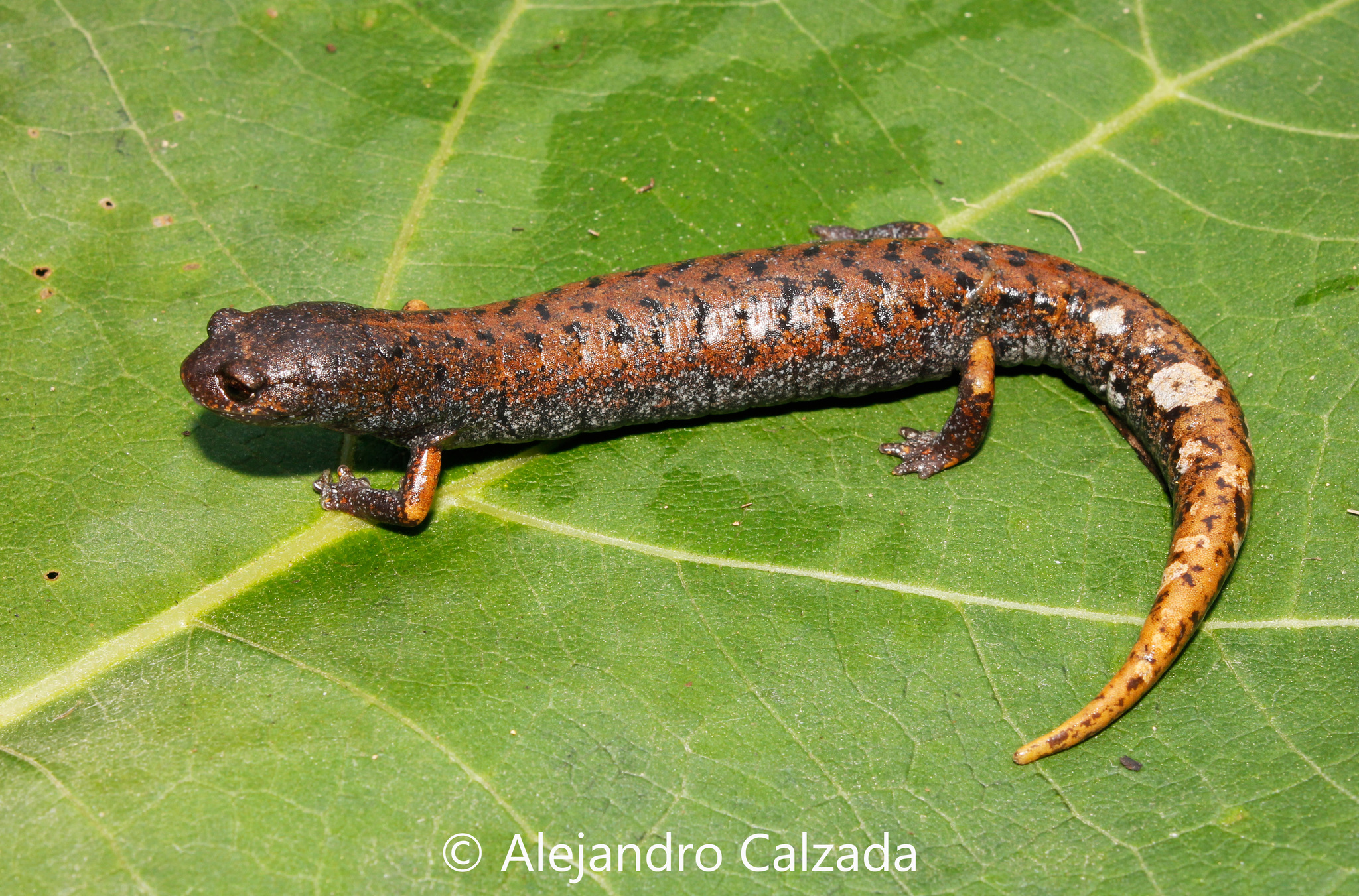
- P. mystax in Oaxaca, Mexico

Conservation status
- Endangered (IUCN 3.1)

Scientific classification
- Kingdom: Animalia
- Phylum: Chordata
- Class: Amphibia
- Order: Urodela
- Family: Plethodontidae
- Genus: Pseudoeurycea
- Species: P. mystax

Binomial name
- Pseudoeurycea mystax Bogert, 1967

= Pseudoeurycea mystax =

Species of amphibian

Pseudoeurycea mystax is a species of salamander in the family Plethodontidae. It is endemic to Mexico and only known from the area of its type locality in the Sierra Madre de Oaxaca near Ayutla, Oaxaca. Its common name is mustache false brook salamander or mustached false brook salamander. The specific name refers to the whitish protuberances on the lips that resemble a mustache in the frontal view of the male holotype.

Pseudoeurycea mystax is only known from the vicinity of San Pedro y San Pablo Ayutla in eastern Oaxaca, Mexico

== Description ==
The type series consists of two specimens, the male holotype measuring 47.5 mm (1.87 in) and the female allotype 42 mm (1.7 in) in snout–vent length. The tail is shorter than the body, with total lengths of about 85 and 69 mm (3.3 and 2.7 in) for the two specimens, respectively. The limbs are moderately short and stout. The dorsum is gray in its ground color with faint traces of pink especially on the snout, and with scattered black dots. The tail has some conspicuous, large white blotches.

== Habitat and conservation ==
Its natural habitat are pine–oak and Arbutus forests at elevations of about 2,100 m (6,900 ft) above sea level. The short and stout limbs of this species suggest that it is terrestrial rather than a climber. The type locality is a ravine, although the species does not seem to be particularly associated with rivers.

It tolerates some habitat disturbance as some small subpopulations survive in tiny fragments of remaining habitat. Habitat loss caused by agriculture, logging, and human settlement is a major threat for this species as only small fragments of original habitat remain. This uncommon species was last been seen in 1999. However, it might be that the species is not quite as uncommon as believed, as local people report having seen salamanders that could be either Pseudoeurycea mystax or Pseudoeurycea cochranae.
