= Eleutherodactylus maurus =

Conservation status
- Vulnerable (IUCN 3.1)

Scientific classification
- Kingdom: Animalia
- Phylum: Chordata
- Class: Amphibia
- Order: Anura
- Family: Eleutherodactylidae
- Genus: Eleutherodactylus
- Subgenus: Syrrhophus
- Species: E. maurus

Binomial name
- Eleutherodactylus maurus Hedges, 1989

Synonyms
- Tomodactylus fuscus Davis and Dixon, 1955 — secondary homonym of Eleutherodactylus fuscus Lynn and Dent, 1943; Syrrhophus fuscus (Davis and Dixon, 1955)

Species of frog

Eleutherodactylus maurus (common names: brown peeping frog, dusky chirping frog; Spanish: rana-fisgona café) is a species of frog in the family Eleutherodactylidae. It is endemic to central Mexico and known from the southeastern Michoacán to Mexico, and Morelos states.

== Taxonomy ==
The species was described in 1955 as Tomodactylus fuscus. However, when transferred to the genus Eleutherodactylus, its name became a secondary homonym of Eleutherodactylus fuscus. The current name, Eleutherodactylus maurus, is a replacement name (nomen novum) created to remedy this situation.

== Description ==
Specimens in the type series measured 25–27 mm (0.98–1.06 in) in snout–vent length. The overall coloration is dark brown. The dorsum bears scattered pustules. The tympanum is small and inconspicuous. The forearms are slender and hands relatively small. The tips of the two outer fingers are expanded and truncate.

Male advertisement call is a single "peep" given at long intervals.

== Habitat and conservation ==
The species' natural habitats are pine forests with abundant rocks and leaf-litter. The specimens in the type series were collected from two locations at elevations of 2,400 and 2,500 m (7,800 and 8,200 ft) above sea level. They were found at night calling from the tops of rocks and off the ground in small bushes, or in one case, in the daytime under a rock.

Eleutherodactylus maurus is an uncommon and poorly known species that is threatened by habitat loss and disturbance caused by expansion of urbanized areas. Mexican law protects it under the "Special Protection" category.
