= Megastomatohyla =

Scientific classification
- Kingdom: Animalia
- Phylum: Chordata
- Class: Amphibia
- Order: Anura
- Family: Hylidae
- Subfamily: Hylinae
- Genus: Megastomatohyla; Faivovich et al., 2005

Type species
- Hyla mixe Duellman, 1965

Species
- 4 species (see text)

Genus of amphibians

Megastomatohyla is a genus of frogs in the family Hylidae. They are endemic to the cloud forests of central Veracruz and Oaxaca, Mexico. All are rare species with restricted distributions. The generic name is derived from Greek mega (="large") and stem of the genitive stomatos (="mouth"), referring to the enlarged oral disc of the tadpoles, juxtaposed with Hyla, the genus in which the four Megastomatohyla species were previously placed. Common name large-mouthed treefrogs has been coined for this genus.

== Taxonomy and characteristics ==
Megastomatohyla was erected in 2005 as a part of a major revision of the Hylidae and corresponds to the former "Hyla mixomaculata group". The delineation was based on molecular data. The only tentative morphological synapomorphy of the genus is the greatly enlarged oral disc of the tadpoles, which has 7–10 anterior rows and 10–11 posterior rows—in those species where this trait is known.

Megastomatohyla are small stream-breeding frogs, reaching a maximum snout–vent length of about 37 mm (1.5 in). Males do not call and lack vocal slits, which could also be a synapomorphy. Males also lack nuptial excrescences on the thumb. The tympanum is concealed. The fingers are no more than one-third webbed, while the toes are at least three-fourths webbed.

== Species ==
The genus contains four recognized species:

Binomial name and author	Common name
M. mixe (Duellman, 1965)	Mixe tree frog
M. mixomaculata (Taylor, 1950)	variegated tree frog
M. nubicola (Duellman, 1964)	cloud forest tree frog
M. pellita (Duellman, 1968)	Oaxacan yellow tree frog
