= Dendrotriton sanctibarbarus =

Conservation status
- Critically Endangered (IUCN 3.1)

Scientific classification
- Kingdom: Animalia
- Phylum: Chordata
- Class: Amphibia
- Order: Urodela
- Family: Plethodontidae
- Genus: Dendrotriton
- Species: D. sanctibarbarus

Binomial name
- Dendrotriton sanctibarbarus (McCranie & Wilson, 1996)

Species of salamander

Dendrotriton sanctibarbarus is a species of salamander in the family Plethodontidae. It is endemic to Honduras and was first described in 1996.

Its natural habitat is subtropical or tropical moist montane forests. It is threatened by habitat loss.
