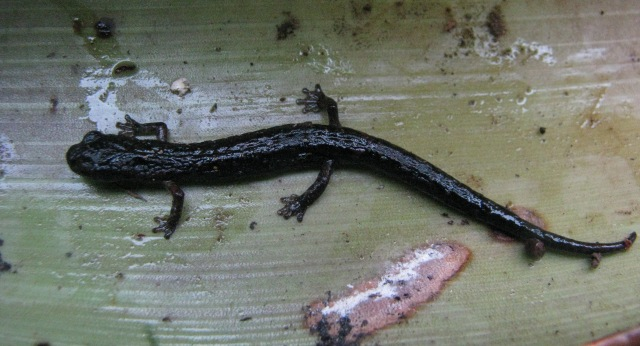
- Dendrotriton rabbi — Guatemalan bromeliad salamander

Scientific classification
- Kingdom: Animalia
- Phylum: Chordata
- Class: Amphibia
- Order: Urodela
- Family: Plethodontidae
- Subfamily: Hemidactyliinae
- Genus: Dendrotriton; Wake and Elias, 1983

Diversity
- 8 species (see text)

= Dendrotriton =

Genus of salamanders

Dendrotriton or bromeliad salamanders is a genus of salamanders in the family Plethodontidae, endemic to South and Central America: from Southwestern Chiapas, Mexico, to Honduras. These are lungless species possessing a slender body, long tail and prominent eyes. They inhabit high-elevation forests with high humidity.

== Species ==
This genus includes the following eight species:

Binomial Name and Author	Common name
Dendrotriton bromeliacius (Schmidt, 1936)	Common bromeliad salamander
Dendrotriton chujorum Campbell, Smith, Streicher, Acevedo, and Brodie, 2010
Dendrotriton cuchumatanus (Lynch and Wake, 1975)	Cuchumatanas bromeliad salamander
Dendrotriton kekchiorum Campbell, Smith, Streicher, Acevedo, and Brodie, 2010
Dendrotriton megarhinus (Rabb, 1960)	Longnose bromeliad salamander
Dendrotriton rabbi (Lynch and Wake, 1975)	Guatemalan bromeliad salamander
Dendrotriton sanctibarbarus (McCranie and Wilson, 1997)	Santa Barbara bromeliad salamander
Dendrotriton xolocalcae (Taylor, 1941)	Xolocalca bromeliad salamander
