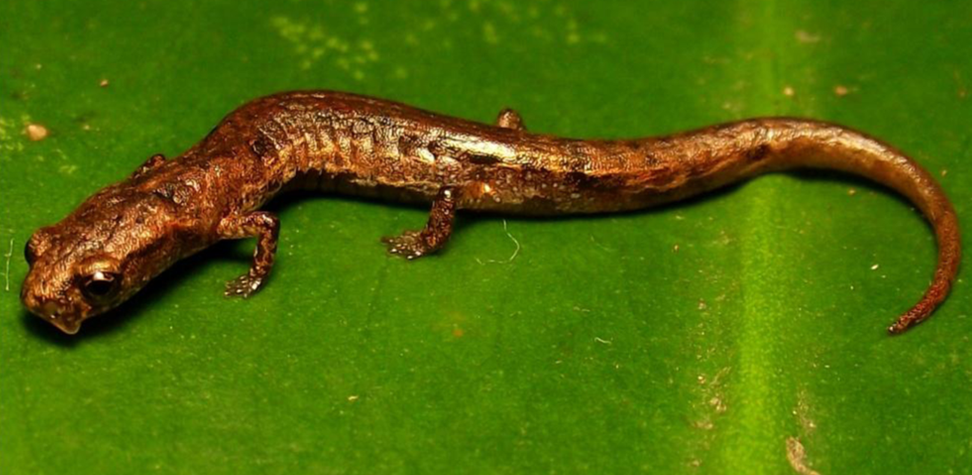

Conservation status
- Vulnerable (IUCN 3.1)

Scientific classification
- Kingdom: Animalia
- Phylum: Chordata
- Class: Amphibia
- Order: Urodela
- Family: Plethodontidae
- Subfamily: Hemidactyliinae
- Genus: Parvimolge; Taylor, 1944
- Species: P. townsendi

Binomial name
- Parvimolge townsendi (Dunn, 1922)

Synonyms
- Oedipus townsendi Dunn, 1922; Bolitoglossa townsendi (Dunn, 1922)

= Parvimolge =

Genus of salamanders

Parvimolge is a genus of salamanders in the family Plethodontidae, the lungless salamanders. It is currently considered as monotypic, although this may yet change as molecular data suggest that it is embedded within a paraphyletic Pseudoeurycea. Parvimolge townsendi is endemic to the northern Sierra Madre de Oaxaca in central and southern Veracruz, Mexico, between 900 and 1900 meters elevation. It is represented by the species Parvimolge townsendi, commonly known as Townsend's dwarf salamander.

== Habitat and conservation ==
Natural habitats of Parvimolge townsendi are cloud and oak forests. They are usually found living in bromeliads or on the ground. They are somewhat adaptable and can survive in shaded coffee plantations as long as humidity levels are maintained.

Parvimolge townsendi has never been common, but it has undergone significant population declines. It has only been observed once since 1997, despite efforts to locate it. It is threatened by habitat loss, but more information on the reasons for the decline of this species is needed.

Parvimolge townsendi was once considered abundant, however Batrachochytrium dendrobatidis, a chytrid fungus, infected this species' geographic range about 40 years ago, devastating many amphibian populations, including Townsend's dwarf salamander (Sandoval-Comte, 2012). The IUCN has even labeled this species as 'possibly extinct,' under geographic range because it has only been spotted once since 1997. However, surveys throughout the 2010s found it to be present in most areas, and even moderately abundant in some places.
