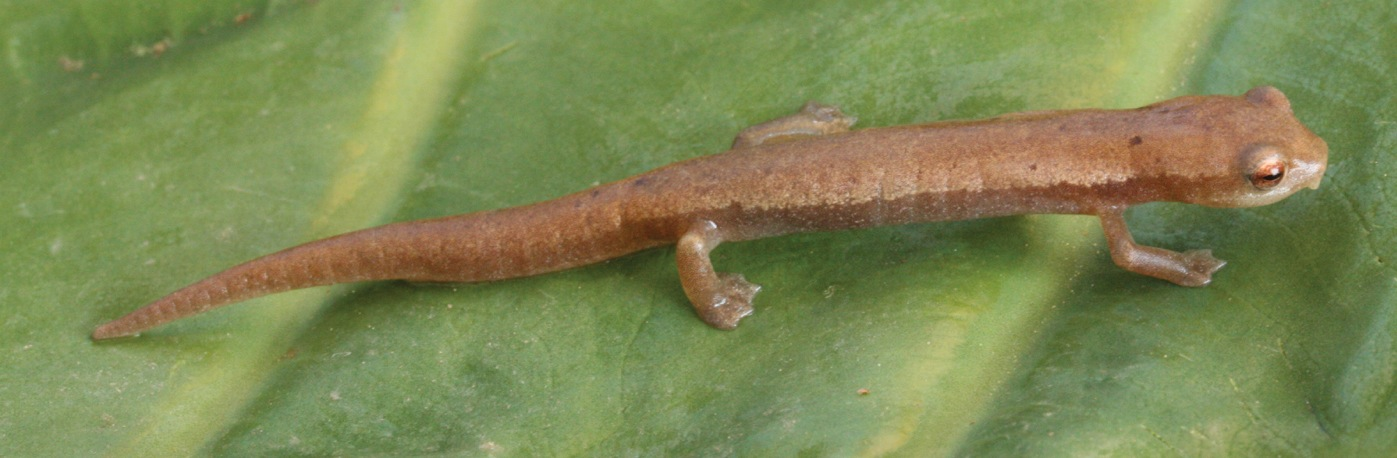

Conservation status
- Near Threatened (IUCN 3.1)

Scientific classification
- Kingdom: Animalia
- Phylum: Chordata
- Class: Amphibia
- Order: Urodela
- Family: Plethodontidae
- Genus: Bolitoglossa
- Species: B. chinanteca

Binomial name
- Bolitoglossa chinanteca Rovito, Parra-Olea, Lee, and Wake, 2012

= Chinanteca salamander =

Species of amphibian

The Chinanteca salamander (Bolitoglossa chinanteca) is a species of salamander in the family Plethodontidae. Males grow to a snout–vent length of 33–41 mm (1.3–1.6 in) and females to 28–43 mm (1.1–1.7 in). The salamander is endemic to the Sierra Mixe and Sierra Juárez of Oaxaca, Mexico. It inhabits cloud forests at elevations of 670–1,500 m (2,200–4,920 ft).

== Taxonomy ==
Prior to its description, specimens of the Chinanteca salamander had been variously misidentified as Bolitoglossa occidentalis and Bolitoglossa rufescens. The Chinanteca salamander was formally described as Bolitoglossa chinanteca in 2012 based on an adult female specimen collected from the Sierra Juárez in the Mexican state of Oaxaca. The species is named after the Chinantec people, an indigenous people of Oaxaca. The species has the English common names Chinanteca salamander and Chinanteca banana salamander. In Spanish, it is known as the Salamandra chinanteca.

It is placed within the subgenus Nanotriton. Its sister taxon is Bolitoglossa occidentalis.

== Description ==
Male Bolitoglossa chinanteca grow to a snout–vent length of 33–41 mm (1.3–1.6 in) and females to 28–43 mm (1.1–1.7 in). They can be found in the axils of banana plants during the day, and on vegetation at night. They are presumably arboreal, like their close relatives.

== Distribution ==
Bolitoglossa chinanteca is known from three localities in Sierra Mixe and Sierra Juárez, Oaxaca. It inhabits cloud forests at elevations of 670–1,500 m (2,200–4,920 ft). The species has not been assessed by the International Union for Conservation of Nature, but it could be classified as "Near Threatened", given its small area of occurrence.
