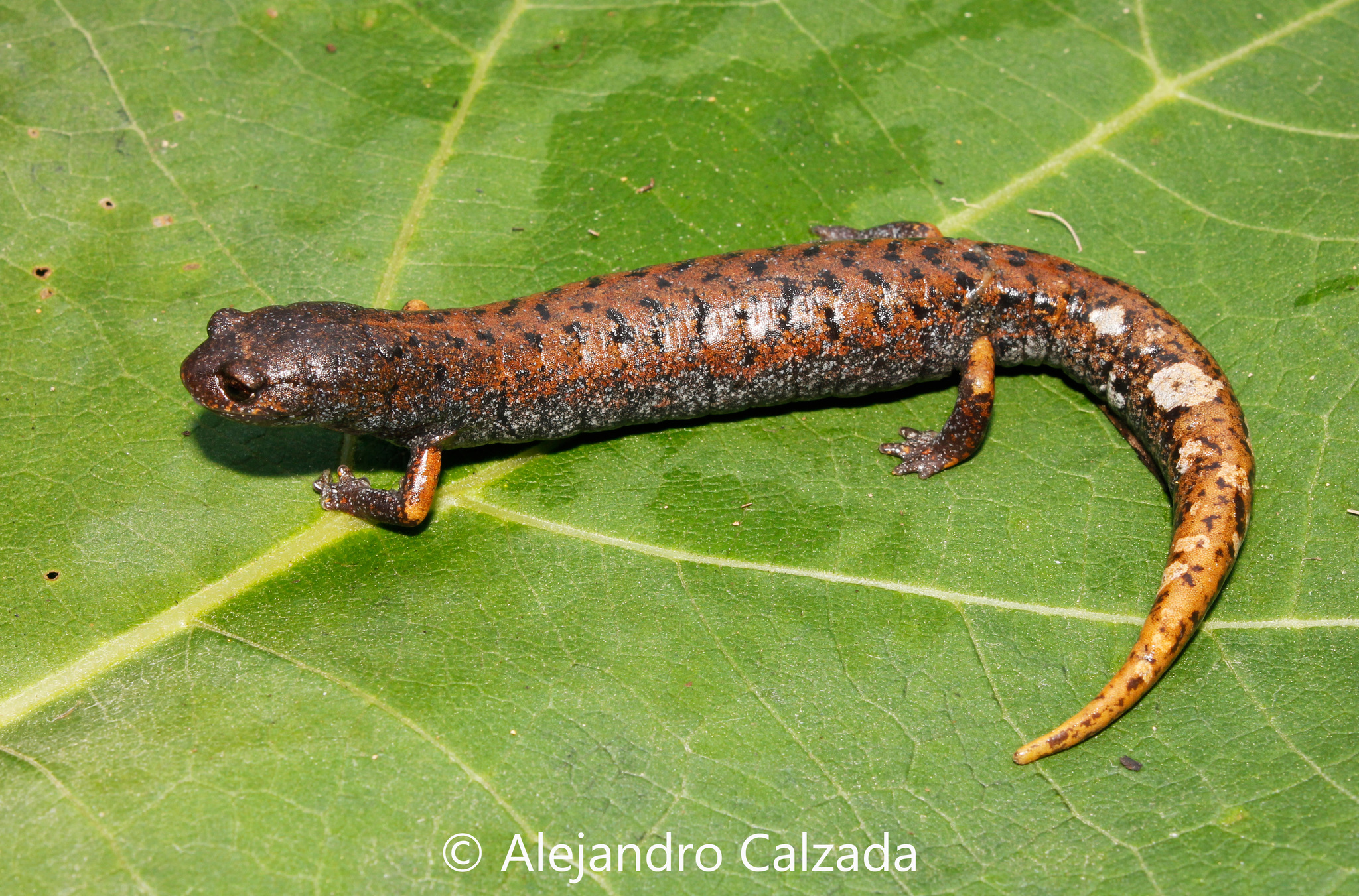
- Pseudoeurycea mystax in Oaxaca, Mexico

Scientific classification
- Kingdom: Animalia
- Phylum: Chordata
- Class: Amphibia
- Order: Urodela
- Family: Plethodontidae
- Subfamily: Hemidactyliinae
- Genus: Pseudoeurycea; Taylor, 1944

Synonyms
- Lineatriton Tanner, 1950

= Pseudoeurycea =

Genus of salamanders

Pseudoeurycea is a genus of salamander in the family Plethodontidae. The members of this genus are commonly known as the false brook salamanders. They are found in Mexico and Guatemala.

In order to preserve Ixalotriton and Bolitoglossa while avoiding paraphyly of Pseudoeurycea, species in the former "Pseudoeurycea bellii species group" have been moved to the genus Isthmura, and those in the former "Pseudoeurycea cephalica species group" to Aquiloeurycea.

== Species ==
It contains the following species:

- Pseudoeurycea ahuitzotl Adler, 1996
- Pseudoeurycea altamontana (Taylor, 1939)
- Pseudoeurycea amuzga Pérez-Ramos and Saldaña de la Riva, 2003
- Pseudoeurycea anitae Bogert, 1967
- Pseudoeurycea aquatica Wake and Campbell, 2001
- Pseudoeurycea aurantia Canseco-Márquez and Parra-Olea, 2003
- Pseudoeurycea brunnata Bumzahem and Smith, 1955
- Pseudoeurycea cochranae (Taylor, 1943)
- Pseudoeurycea conanti Bogert, 1967
- †Pseudoeurycea exspectata Stuart, 1954
- Pseudoeurycea firscheini Shannon and Werler, 1955
- Pseudoeurycea gadovii (Dunn, 1926)
- Pseudoeurycea goebeli (Schmidt, 1936)
- Pseudoeurycea jaguar Cázares-Hernández, 2022
- Pseudoeurycea juarezi Regal, 1966
- Pseudoeurycea kuautli Campbell, Brodie, Blancas-Hernández, and Smith, 2013
- Pseudoeurycea leprosa (Cope, 1869)
- Pseudoeurycea lineola (Cope, 1865)
- Pseudoeurycea longicauda Lynch, Wake, and Yang, 1983
- Pseudoeurycea lynchi Parra-Olea, Papenfuss, and Wake, 2001
- Pseudoeurycea melanomolga (Taylor, 1941)
- Pseudoeurycea mixcoatl Adler, 1996
- Pseudoeurycea mixteca Canseco-Márquez and Gutiérrez-Mayén, 2005
- Pseudoeurycea mystax Bogert, 1967
- Pseudoeurycea nigromaculata (Taylor, 1941)
- Pseudoeurycea obesa Parra-Olea, García-París, Hanken, and Wake, 2005
- Pseudoeurycea orchileucos (Brodie, Mendelson, and Campbell, 2002)
- Pseudoeurycea orchimelas (Brodie, Mendelson, and Campbell, 2002)
- Pseudoeurycea papenfussi Parra-Olea, García-París, Hanken, and Wake, 2005
- Pseudoeurycea rex (Dunn, 1921)
- Pseudoeurycea robertsi (Taylor, 1939)
- Pseudoeurycea ruficauda Parra-Olea, García-París, Hanken, and Wake, 2004
- Pseudoeurycea saltator Lynch and Wake, 1989
- Pseudoeurycea smithi (Taylor, 1939)
- Pseudoeurycea tenchalli Adler, 1996
- Pseudoeurycea teotepec Adler, 1996
- Pseudoeurycea tlahcuiloh Adler, 1996
- Pseudoeurycea tlilicxitl Lara-Góngora, 2003
- Pseudoeurycea unguidentis (Taylor, 1941)
- Pseudoeurycea werleri Darling and Smith, 1954
