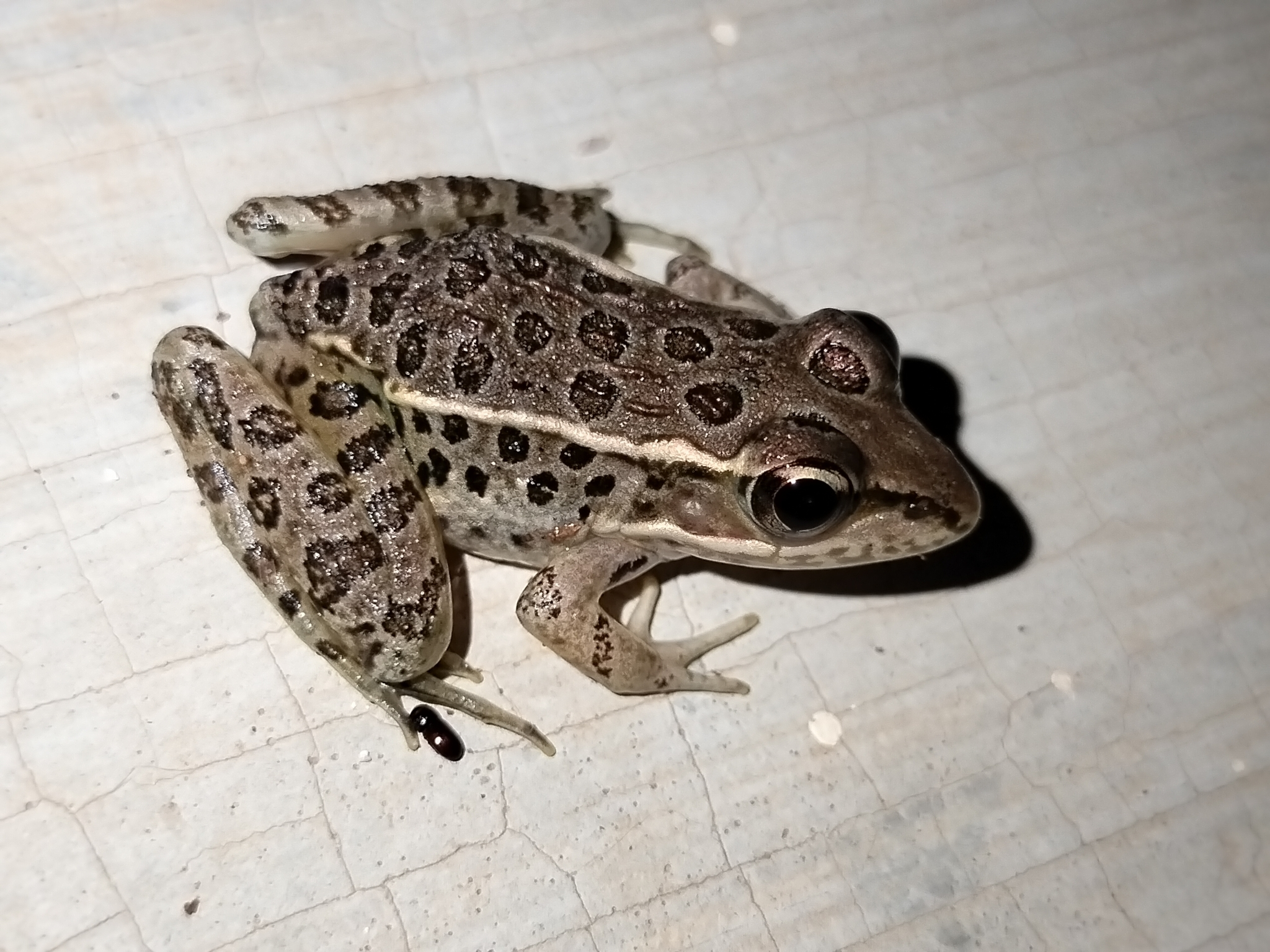

Conservation status
- Least Concern (IUCN 3.1)

Scientific classification
- Kingdom: Animalia
- Phylum: Chordata
- Class: Amphibia
- Order: Anura
- Family: Ranidae
- Genus: Lithobates
- Species: L. magnaocularis

Binomial name
- Lithobates magnaocularis (Frost & Bagnara, 1974)

Synonyms
- Rana magnaocularis Frost & Bagnara, 1974

= Northwest Mexico leopard frog =

Species of amphibian

The Northwest Mexico leopard frog (Lithobates magnaocularis) is a species of frog in the family Ranidae endemic to Mexico. This predominantly aquatic frog inhabits temporary or permanent pools in shrublands and mesquite forests. It might be threatened by droughts.

It ranges along the Pacific slope of the Sierra Madre Occidental and adjacent coastal plain from southern Sonora state to southwards to the Río Grande de Santiago valley, where it occurs from sea level to 470 meters elevation.

== See also ==
- List of amphibians of Mexico
