= Mixe tree frog =

Conservation status
- Critically Endangered (IUCN 3.1)

Scientific classification
- Kingdom: Animalia
- Phylum: Chordata
- Class: Amphibia
- Order: Anura
- Family: Hylidae
- Genus: Megastomatohyla
- Species: M. mixe

Binomial name
- Megastomatohyla mixe (Duellman, 1965)

Species of amphibian

The Mixe tree frog (Megastomatohyla mixe) is a species of frog in the family Hylidae endemic to Mexico. Its natural habitats are subtropical or tropical moist montane forests and rivers. It is threatened by habitat loss.
