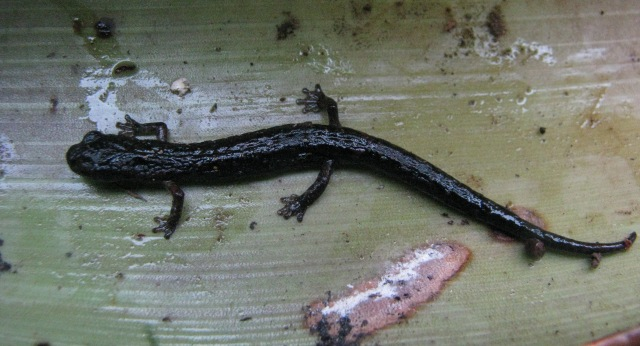

Conservation status
- Critically Endangered (IUCN 3.1)

Scientific classification
- Kingdom: Animalia
- Phylum: Chordata
- Class: Amphibia
- Order: Urodela
- Family: Plethodontidae
- Genus: Dendrotriton
- Species: D. rabbi

Binomial name
- Dendrotriton rabbi (Lynch and Wake, 1975)

Synonyms
- Chiropterotriton rabbi Lynch and Wake, 1975

= Dendrotriton rabbi =

Species of amphibian

Dendrotriton rabbi, commonly known as the Guatemalan bromeliad salamander, is a species of salamander in the family Plethodontidae. It is endemic to Guatemala and is known from the Montañas de Cuilco, near the Mexican border, and from the Sierra de los Cuchumatanes. Its range might extend into Mexico.

== Etymology ==
The specific name rabbi honours George B. Rabb, an American zoologist.

== Description ==
Males grow to at least 36.7 mm (1.44 in) and females to 37.5 mm (1.48 in) in snout–vent length. Individuals larger than about 25 mm (0.98 in) SVL are mature. Tail is longer than the body in adults. The limbs are slender and relatively long. The feet are slightly webbed. The body is dark brown dorsally and has obscure orange flecks and lighter pigmentation mid-dorsally; some individuals have light mid-dorsal stripe, paravertebral stripes, or distinct reticulate blotching. The venter is light gray and is diffusely peppered with small melanophores.

== Habitat and conservation ==
Dendrotriton rabbi inhabits forests at the subtropical-temperate forest transition zone. Its elevational range is 2,100–3,000 m (6,900–9,800 ft) above sea level. It occurs in bromeliads and under bark on tree stumps and logs. The species is threatened by habitat loss caused by forest clearance, typically for wood extraction and expanding small-holder farming.
