= Eleutherodactylus rufescens =

Conservation status
- Vulnerable (IUCN 3.1)

Scientific classification
- Kingdom: Animalia
- Phylum: Chordata
- Class: Amphibia
- Order: Anura
- Clade: Brachycephaloidea
- Family: Eleutherodactylidae
- Genus: Eleutherodactylus
- Subgenus: Syrrhophus
- Species: E. rufescens

Binomial name
- Eleutherodactylus rufescens (Duellman & Dixon, 1959)

Synonyms
- Syrrhophus nivicolimae Dixon and Webb, 1966; Eleutherodactylus nivicolimae (Dixon and Webb, 1966)

Species of frog

Eleutherodactylus rufescens, commonly known as the red peeping frog or Nevado de Colima chirping frog, is a species of frog in the family Eleutherodactylidae. It is endemic to Mexico and known from the region of the eponymous Nevado de Colima mountain in Colima, Jalisco, and further east and south in the Jalisco and Michoacán states. Its natural habitat is subtropical or tropical moist montane forests. It is threatened by habitat loss.

== Description ==
Males measure 19.0–21.5 mm (0.75–0.85 in) and a female paratype was 23.5 mm (0.93 in), although Quezada-Hipólito and colleagues reported a calling male as small as 13 mm (0.51 in) in snout–vent length. The snout is short and somewhat rounded. The head is relatively wide with small eyes; in comparison, the tympanum is relatively large. The skin of the dorsum and limbs is visibly warty, although the warts are small. The dorsal ground color is variable and ranges from gray through buff, pale yellow, orange-red to brown. In most specimens, the neck and arms are darker than the body and legs. There is a broad dark-brown mid-dorsal stripe with well-defined margins.

== Habitat and conservation ==
The species' natural habitats are tropical lower montane forests and pine and oak forests at elevations of 600–2,400 m (2,000–7,900 ft) above sea level. It is a terrestrial frog.

Eleutherodactylus rufescens is widespread on the slopes of Nevado de Colima. During the rainy season it is also numerous. The major threat to this species is the eruption of the Volcán de Colima. The species' range includes the Volcan Nevado de Colima National Park. The International Union for Conservation of Nature (IUCN) has assessed this species as "Vulnerable"; several records extending its known range to east and south have been published after the assessment.
