= Pseudoeurycea brunnata =

Conservation status
- Critically endangered, possibly extinct (IUCN 3.1)

Scientific classification
- Kingdom: Animalia
- Phylum: Chordata
- Class: Amphibia
- Order: Urodela
- Family: Plethodontidae
- Genus: Pseudoeurycea
- Species: P. brunnata

Binomial name
- Pseudoeurycea brunnata Bumzahem & Smith, 1955

Species of amphibian

Pseudoeurycea brunnata is a species of salamander in the family Plethodontidae. It was formerly only found in a few disjunct populations in Guatemala and southern Mexico. Its natural habitat is subtropical or tropical moist montane forests. It is considered a critically endangered species because population numbers have declined by more than 80% over the last 10 years.
