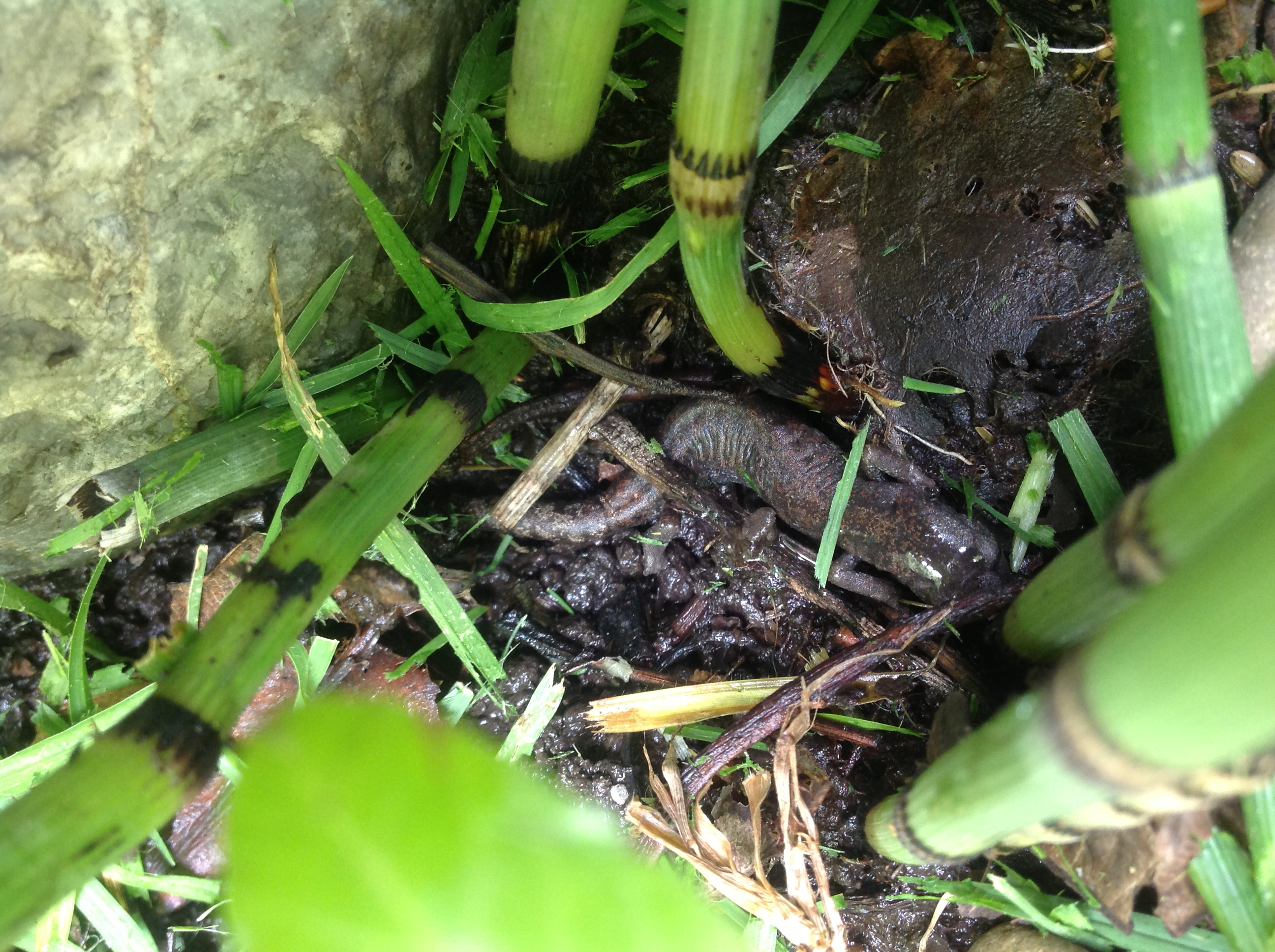

Conservation status
- Least Concern (IUCN 3.1)

Scientific classification
- Kingdom: Animalia
- Phylum: Chordata
- Class: Amphibia
- Order: Urodela
- Family: Plethodontidae
- Genus: Pseudoeurycea
- Species: P. leprosa

Binomial name
- Pseudoeurycea leprosa (Cope, 1869)

= Pseudoeurycea leprosa =

Species of salamander

Pseudoeurycea leprosa is a species of salamander in the family Plethodontidae, endemic to Mexico. The species of Pseudoeurycea Leprosa are primarily distributed across Northern and central Mexico, with new species continually emerging that share genetic similarities with preexisting ones. Research scientists discovered these similarities by analyzing the base pairs of various Pseudoeurycea species from different regions of Mexico.

Its natural habitat is subtropical or tropical moist montane forests. It is threatened by habitat loss. Pseudoeurycea leprosa exhibited extensive genetic divergence between its eastern and central populations due to habitat isolation.
