= Pseudoeurycea ahuitzotl =

Conservation status
- Critically Endangered (IUCN 3.1)

Scientific classification
- Kingdom: Animalia
- Phylum: Chordata
- Class: Amphibia
- Order: Urodela
- Family: Plethodontidae
- Genus: Pseudoeurycea
- Species: P. ahuitzotl

Binomial name
- Pseudoeurycea ahuitzotl Adler, 1996

Species of amphibian

Pseudoeurycea ahuitzotl, commonly known as the imperial salamander, is a species of salamander in the family Plethodontidae. It is endemic to Mexico and only known from its type locality, Cerro Teotepec (Sierra Madre del Sur) in Guerrero, at about 2,000 m (6,600 ft) asl. It is known from open fir-pine-oak forest with bunchgrass. It seems to require fallen logs for hiding at the daytime.
