= Pseudoeurycea amuzga =

Conservation status
- Endangered (IUCN 3.1)

Scientific classification
- Kingdom: Animalia
- Phylum: Chordata
- Class: Amphibia
- Order: Urodela
- Family: Plethodontidae
- Genus: Pseudoeurycea
- Species: P. amuzga

Binomial name
- Pseudoeurycea amuzga Pérez-Ramos and Saldaña de la Riva, 2003

Species of amphibian

Pseudoeurycea amuzga, which has been given the common name of Sierra de Malinaltepec salamander, is a species of salamander in the family Plethodontidae. It is endemic to Mexico and known only from Sierra de Malinaltepec, a part of Sierra Madre del Sur in the state of Guerrero.

Its natural habitats are mixed montane forests at elevations of 1,645–1,740 m (5,397–5,709 ft) above sea level. It has been found under rocks, in holes, and under the bark of trees. It is threatened by habitat loss caused by small-scale farming and wood extraction.
