= Oaxacan yellow tree frog =

Conservation status
- Critically Endangered (IUCN 3.1)

Scientific classification
- Kingdom: Animalia
- Phylum: Chordata
- Class: Amphibia
- Order: Anura
- Family: Hylidae
- Genus: Megastomatohyla
- Species: M. pellita

Binomial name
- Megastomatohyla pellita (Duellman, 1968)

Species of amphibian

The Oaxacan yellow tree frog (Megastomatohyla pellita) is a species of frog in the family Hylidae and is endemic to Mexico. Its natural habitats are subtropical or tropical moist montane forests and rivers. It is threatened by habitat loss.
