= Pseudoeurycea longicauda =

Conservation status
- Endangered (IUCN 3.1)

Scientific classification
- Kingdom: Animalia
- Phylum: Chordata
- Class: Amphibia
- Order: Urodela
- Family: Plethodontidae
- Genus: Pseudoeurycea
- Species: P. longicauda

Binomial name
- Pseudoeurycea longicauda Lynch, Wake & Yang, 1983

Species of salamander

Pseudoeurycea longicauda is a species of salamander in the family Plethodontidae. It is endemic to Mexico.

Its natural habitat is subtropical or tropical moist montane forests. It is threatened by habitat loss.
