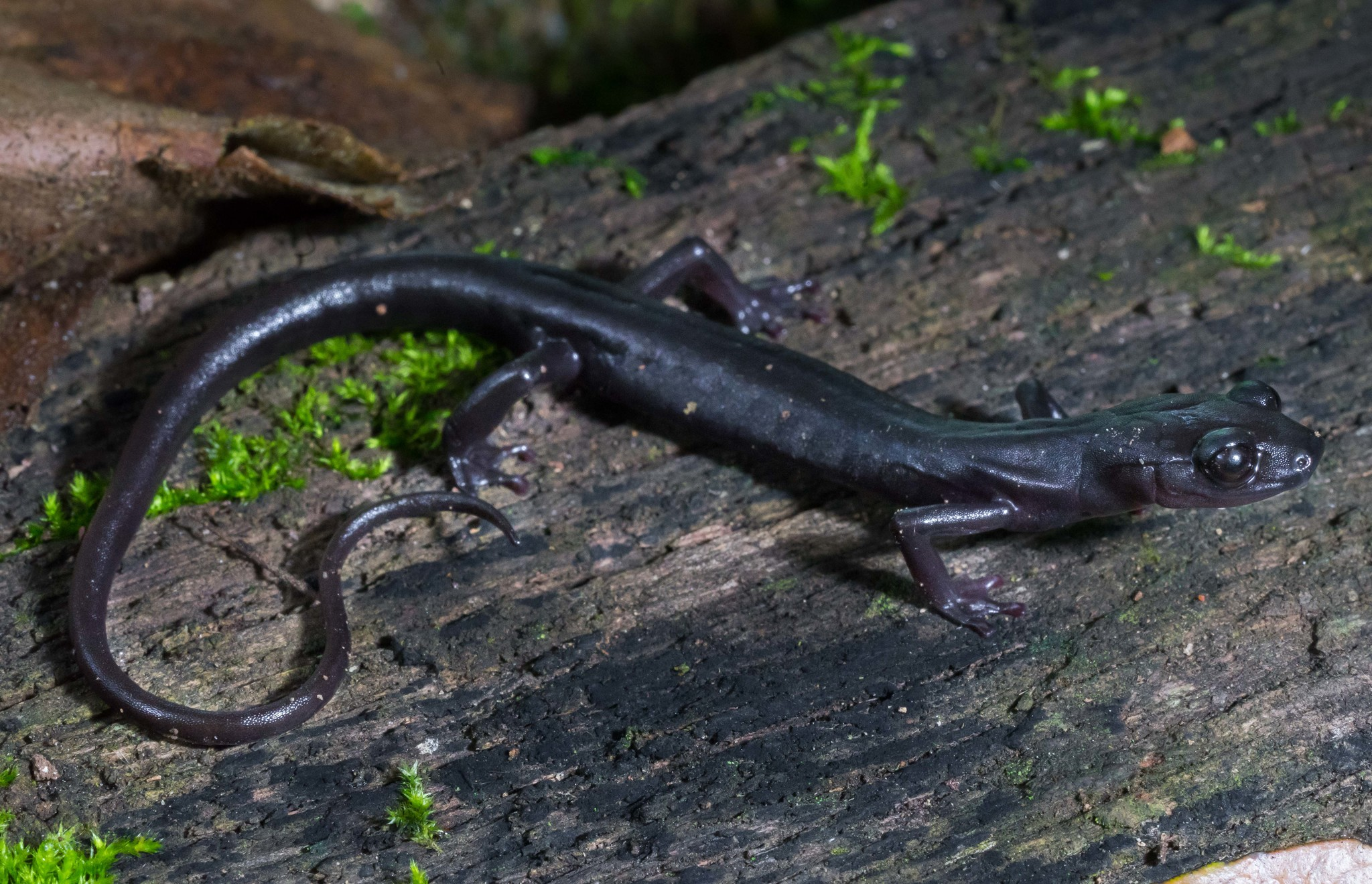
- I. niger

Scientific classification
- Kingdom: Animalia
- Phylum: Chordata
- Class: Amphibia
- Order: Urodela
- Family: Plethodontidae
- Subfamily: Hemidactyliinae
- Genus: Ixalotriton; Wake and Johnson, 1989

= Ixalotriton =

Genus of salamanders

Ixalotriton is a genus of salamanders in the family Plethodontidae. It contains the following species:

- Ixalotriton niger
- Ixalotriton parvus
