= Pseudoeurycea mixcoatl =

Conservation status
- Critically Endangered (IUCN 3.1)

Scientific classification
- Kingdom: Animalia
- Phylum: Chordata
- Class: Amphibia
- Order: Urodela
- Family: Plethodontidae
- Genus: Pseudoeurycea
- Species: P. mixcoatl

Binomial name
- Pseudoeurycea mixcoatl Adler, 1996

Species of amphibian

Pseudoeurycea mixcoatl, commonly known as brown-streaked salamander, is a species of salamander in the family Plethodontidae. It is endemic to Mexico. It is native to the Sierra Madre del Sur of Guerrero state, around the towns of Asoleadero and Carrizal de Bravo. It occurs at elevations ranging between 2,200 and 2,600 meters elevation. Its current known extent of occurrence (EOO) is 50 km^{2}.

Its natural habitat is oak-pine-fir cloud forest dominated by large bromeliad-covered oaks. It takes daytime refuge in fallen logs.

It is threatened by habitat loss.

The species' specific descriptor is named after Mixcoatl, a pre-Columbian deity figure among a number of central Mexican cultures such as the Otomi and Nahua. The Classical Nahuatl word mixcōātl has the meaning of "cloud serpent".
