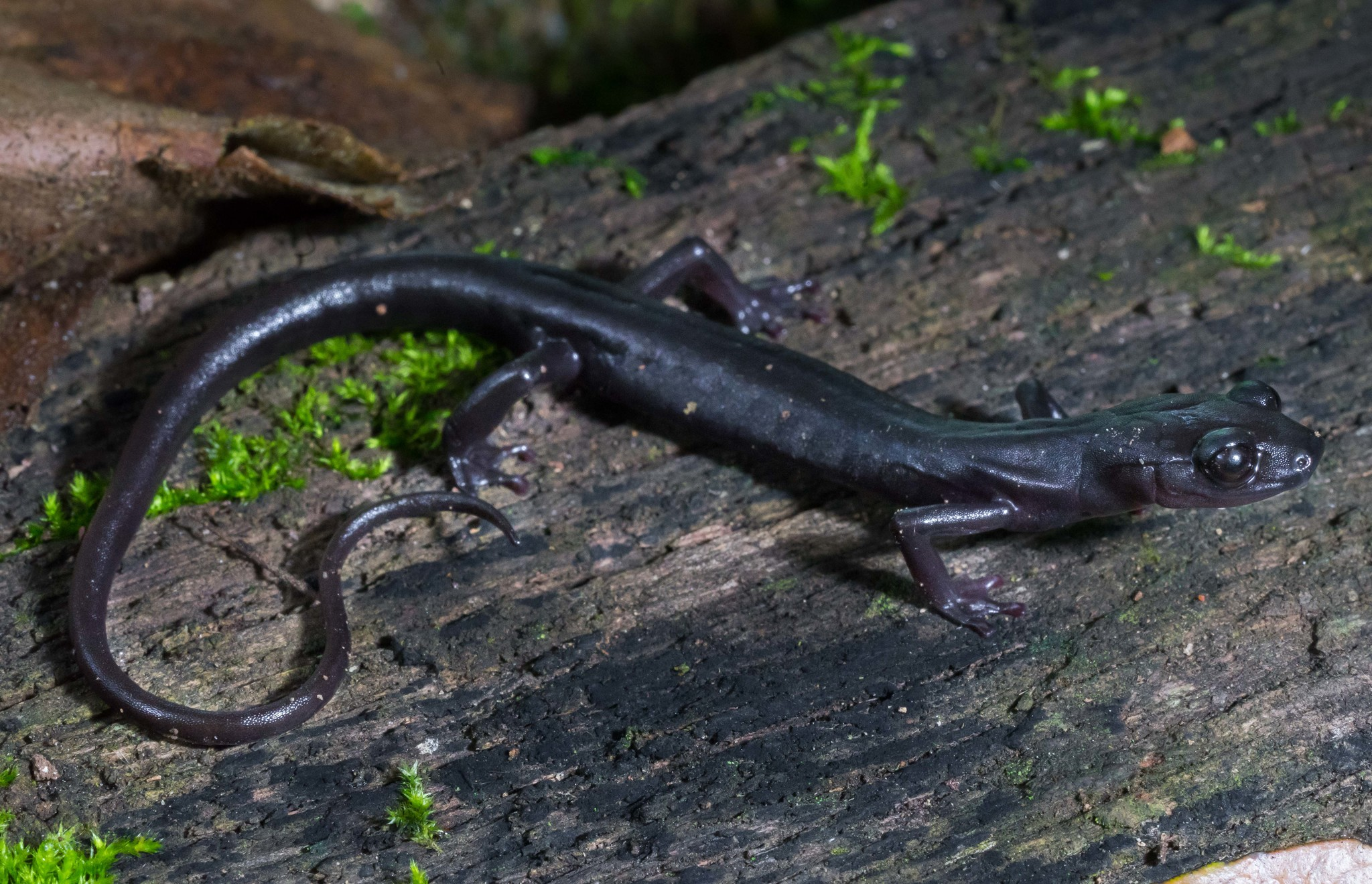

Conservation status
- Endangered (IUCN 3.1)

Scientific classification
- Kingdom: Animalia
- Phylum: Chordata
- Class: Amphibia
- Order: Urodela
- Family: Plethodontidae
- Genus: Ixalotriton
- Species: I. niger

Binomial name
- Ixalotriton niger Wake & Johnson, 1989

Synonyms
- Pseudoeurycea nigra

= Ixalotriton niger =

Species of amphibian

Ixalotriton niger, the black jumping salamander, is a species of salamander in the family Plethodontidae. It is endemic to Mexico. Its natural habitats are subtropical or tropical moist montane forests and rocky areas and it is threatened by habitat loss.

== Description ==
Ixalotriton niger is a long, slender salamander with a wide head, protuberant eyes, long limbs, large hands and feet and a long, gradually tapering tail. It grows to a total length of nearly 6 centimetres (2.4 in) and is a glossy black colour. At night it changes to a chocolate brown colour. The snout may have a small white patch and the tips or the toes are red, perhaps because of an absence of pigment allowing the vascular tissue below to show through.

== Distribution and habitat ==
Ixalotriton niger is found at about 1,100 metres (3,600 ft) above sea level on the Atlantic side of the Northern Highland Mountains in Chiapas State in south west Mexico. The area where it is endemic is composed of fissured limestone crags clothed in an evergreen forest rich in epiphytes including mosses, ferns, bromeliads, philodendrons and orchids.

== Behaviour ==
Ixalotriton niger is an arboreal species that was first described in 1989. It is an elusive species and scrambles around on the trunks of trees and is capable of jumping in a lizard-like manner when disturbed. It readily autotomizes its tail to escape predators and can also produce a noxious sticky secretion from glands.

There is no aquatic larval stage and the young develop directly inside the egg.

== Status ==
Ixalotriton niger is considered "Endangered" in the IUCN Red List of Threatened Species. This is because its range is only about 10 square kilometres (3.9 sq mi) and the forest where it lives is being disturbed by logging. It was believed to be extinct, but in 2000 ten specimens were located. It was surveyed again in 2006 and 2007 and on both occasions, no specimens were found. However, the nights were wet and the salamanders may have moved higher into the canopy.
