= Dendrotriton xolocalcae =

Conservation status
- Vulnerable (IUCN 3.1)

Scientific classification
- Kingdom: Animalia
- Phylum: Chordata
- Class: Amphibia
- Order: Urodela
- Family: Plethodontidae
- Genus: Dendrotriton
- Species: D. xolocalcae

Binomial name
- Dendrotriton xolocalcae (Taylor, 1941)

Synonyms
- Bolitoglossa xolocalcae Taylor, 1941; Chiropterotriton xolocalcae (Taylor, 1941)

Species of salamander

Dendrotriton xolocalcae, commonly known as the Xolocalca bromeliad salamander or Xolocalco bromeliad salamander, is a species of salamander in the family Plethodontidae. It is endemic to Chiapas, Mexico, and only known from its type locality, Cerro Ovando, at an elevation of about 2,000 m (6,600 ft) asl. The specific name xolocalcae is derived from the Indian name of Cerro Ovando, Xolocalco.

== Description ==
The holotype (sex unspecified) measures 37 mm (1.5 in) in snout–vent length and 56 mm (2.2 in) in total length. The body and head are flattened, and the head is much broader than the body. The hands and feet are large. Only the first finger and toe are webbed; the digits are broad and truncate. The tail is slender and attenuated. There are three distinct color patters: most specimens are mottled brownish-lavender above, with a black, triangular head marking. Some specimens have a pair of cream dorsolateral lines that start from the eyelid and continue back. The third variety has pinkish cream back and tail, with a pair of black dots on neck and a blackish triangle behind it. The underside is dirty cream.

== Habitat and conservation ==
Dendrotriton xolocalcae lives in bromeliads in pine-oak forest at 2,000 m (6,600 ft) above sea level. It appears to be abundant within its small range, given that as many as 34 individuals have been spotted in a single bromeliad. The locality is potentially threatened by expanding agriculture and wood extraction, although so far the area has seen minimal anthropogenic impacts. It might occur in the nearby El Triunfo Biosphere Reserve, although it has not been encountered there.
