= Cloud forest tree frog =

Conservation status
- Critically Endangered (IUCN 3.1)

Scientific classification
- Kingdom: Animalia
- Phylum: Chordata
- Class: Amphibia
- Order: Anura
- Family: Hylidae
- Genus: Megastomatohyla
- Species: M. nubicola

Binomial name
- Megastomatohyla nubicola (Duellman, 1964)

Synonyms
- Hyla nubicola Duellman, 1964

Species of amphibian

The cloud forest tree frog (Megastomatohyla nubicola) is a species of frog in the family Hylidae endemic to Mexico. Its natural habitats are subtropical or tropical moist montane forests and rivers. It is threatened by habitat loss.

William Edward Duellman described the species in 1964; he placed it in the genus Hyla. The specific name, nubicola, Latin for "sky-dwelling", refers to its habitat being a cloud forest. It was transferred to Megastomatohyla upon that genus's circumscription in 2005.
