= Pseudoeurycea tlilicxitl =

Conservation status
- Endangered (IUCN 3.1)

Scientific classification
- Kingdom: Animalia
- Phylum: Chordata
- Class: Amphibia
- Order: Urodela
- Family: Plethodontidae
- Genus: Pseudoeurycea
- Species: P. tlilicxitl

Binomial name
- Pseudoeurycea tlilicxitl Lara-Góngora, 2003

Species of salamander

Pseudoeurycea tlilicxitl is a species of salamander in the family Plethodontidae. It is endemic to Mexico.

Its natural habitats are subtropical or tropical dry forests and subtropical or tropical moist montane forests.
