= Variegated tree frog =

Conservation status
- Endangered (IUCN 3.1)

Scientific classification
- Kingdom: Animalia
- Phylum: Chordata
- Class: Amphibia
- Order: Anura
- Family: Hylidae
- Genus: Megastomatohyla
- Species: M. mixomaculata

Binomial name
- Megastomatohyla mixomaculata (Taylor, 1950)

Species of amphibian

The variegated tree frog (Megastomatohyla mixomaculata) is a species of frog in the family Hylidae endemic to Mexico. Its natural habitats are subtropical or tropical moist montane forests and intermittent rivers. It is threatened by habitat loss. Humans are destroying their habitats because of the population increase.
