= Eleutherodactylus fuscus =

Conservation status
- Endangered (IUCN 3.1)

Scientific classification
- Kingdom: Animalia
- Phylum: Chordata
- Class: Amphibia
- Order: Anura
- Family: Eleutherodactylidae
- Genus: Eleutherodactylus
- Species: E. fuscus

Binomial name
- Eleutherodactylus fuscus Lynn & Dent, 1943

Species of frog

Eleutherodactylus fuscus is a species of frog in the family Eleutherodactylidae endemic to Jamaica. Its natural habitats are subtropical or tropical moist lowland forest and rocky areas. It is threatened by habitat loss.
