= Pseudoeurycea aquatica =

Conservation status
- Critically Endangered (IUCN 3.1)

Scientific classification
- Kingdom: Animalia
- Phylum: Chordata
- Class: Amphibia
- Order: Urodela
- Family: Plethodontidae
- Genus: Pseudoeurycea
- Species: P. aquatica

Binomial name
- Pseudoeurycea aquatica Wake and Campbell, 2001

Species of amphibian

Pseudoeurycea aquatica, which has been given the common name of aquatic salamander is a species of salamander in the family Plethodontidae. It is endemic to Mexico and only known from its type locality in the Sierra Madre de Oaxaca near Totontepec Villa de Morelos, Oaxaca.

The natural habitat of Pseudoeurycea aquatica is cloud forest at about 2,100 m (6,900 ft) above sea level. It lives aquatically in streams, the only plethodontid salamander in Mesoamerica to do so. It is only known from three specimens collected in 1978, and the original habitat has been completely destroyed. Subsequent searches have been unsuccessful, and the species is likely to be extinct.
