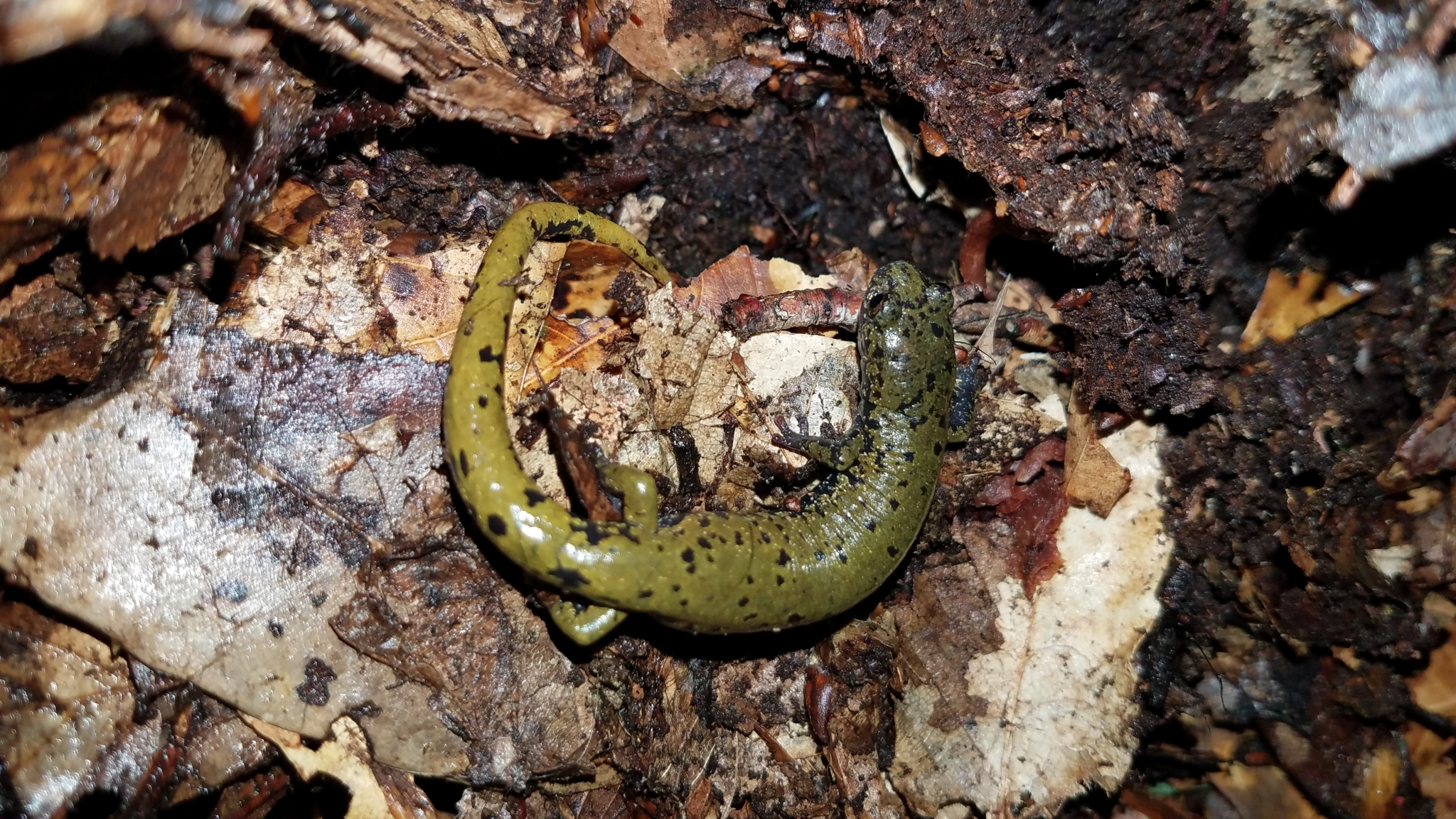

Conservation status
- Endangered (IUCN 3.1)

Scientific classification
- Kingdom: Animalia
- Phylum: Chordata
- Class: Amphibia
- Order: Urodela
- Family: Plethodontidae
- Genus: Pseudoeurycea
- Species: P. lynchi

Binomial name
- Pseudoeurycea lynchi Parra-Olea, Papenfuss, and Wake, 2001

= Pseudoeurycea lynchi =

Species of amphibian

Pseudoeurycea lynchi, commonly known as the Veracruz green salamander, is a species of salamanders in the family Plethodontidae.

== Etymology ==
The specific name lynchi honors Dr. James Francis Lynch (1942–1988), a "friend and long-time collaborator". (Not John D. Lynch as sometimes claimed.)

== Description ==
Adult males measure 41–48 mm (1.6–1.9 in) and females 41–54 mm (1.6–2.1 in) in snout–vent length (SVL). The tail is relatively stout, tapering rather abruptly toward the tip, and is about the same length as the SVL (range 86–115 %). The hands and feet are comparatively well developed. The coloration of the dorsum is variable: dark green, green-ochre, pale yellow-green, tannish yellow, or in some populations, even blue-gray. The ground color is black, and there are usually many black spots and short streaks. The tail is usually paler than the body and ends with a bright yellow to reddish orange tip. Some individuals have a distinct, shallow V-shaped yellowish band between the eyes. The limb insertions are greenish yellow. The venter is black. The iris is coppery gold.

== Distribution ==
It is endemic to the central Sierra Madre Oriental in Veracruz and Puebla states, Mexico.

== Habitat and conservation ==
This terrestrial salamander has direct development. Its natural habitats are cloud forests at elevations of 1,200–1,500 m (3,900–4,900 ft) above sea level. It can be found in decaying wood, under bark of logs, under moss, and under pine logs. It can also be found off the ground.

Pseudoeurycea lynchi can survive in degraded forest and rural gardens. Despite being adaptable to some habitat degradation, extensive forest loss caused by agriculture, logging, and mining is threatening this species. The populations appear to be on decline.
