= Pseudoeurycea mixteca =

Conservation status
- Vulnerable (IUCN 3.1)

Scientific classification
- Kingdom: Animalia
- Phylum: Chordata
- Class: Amphibia
- Order: Urodela
- Family: Plethodontidae
- Genus: Pseudoeurycea
- Species: P. mixteca

Binomial name
- Pseudoeurycea mixteca Canseco-Márquez & Gutiérrez-Mayén, 2005

Species of salamander

Pseudoeurycea mixteca is a species of salamander in the family Plethodontidae. It is endemic to Mexico.

Its natural habitat is subtropical or tropical dry forests.
