= Ridge tail salamander =

Conservation status
- Critically Endangered (IUCN 3.1)

Scientific classification
- Kingdom: Animalia
- Phylum: Chordata
- Class: Amphibia
- Order: Urodela
- Family: Plethodontidae
- Genus: Pseudoeurycea
- Species: P. obesa

Binomial name
- Pseudoeurycea obesa Parra-Olea, García-París, Hanken & Wake, 2005

Species of amphibian

The ridge tail salamander (Pseudoeurycea obesa), also known as ridge-tailed salamander is a species of salamander in the family Plethodontidae. It is endemic to Oaxaca, Mexico, and only known from the area of its type locality on the mountain pass of Plan de Guadalupe in the Sierra de Mazateca, part of the Sierra Madre de Oaxaca, at 2,150 meters elevation. Future work might prove it to be more widespread than current records suggest. Its extent of occurrence is 10 km2.

Its natural habitat is cloud forest. It is only known from a total of five individuals that were found under small rocks and schist slabs in roadside talus. This might indicate tolerance to habitat modification, but habitat loss (deforestation) occurring in the area is a threat to this species.
