= Pseudoeurycea melanomolga =

Conservation status
- Endangered (IUCN 3.1)

Scientific classification
- Kingdom: Animalia
- Phylum: Chordata
- Class: Amphibia
- Order: Urodela
- Family: Plethodontidae
- Genus: Pseudoeurycea
- Species: P. melanomolga

Binomial name
- Pseudoeurycea melanomolga (Taylor, 1941)

Synonyms
- Bolitoglossa melanomolga Taylor, 1941

Species of amphibian

Pseudoeurycea melanomolga, commonly known as the black false brook salamander or black salamander, is a species of salamander in the family Plethodontidae. It is endemic to Mexico and known from the surroundings of the Cofre de Perote in west-central Veracruz as well as from two localities in the adjacent northeast Puebla (near Teziutlán and González Ortega).

== Description ==
The holotype is an adult female measuring 72 mm (2.8 in) in snout–vent length. The tail is missing but would probably have been at least as long as the body. There is a slight, transverse gular fold, with the associated grooves reaching mid-dorsal line. The colouration is purplish black above and somewhat lighter ventrally. There are paired dorsal flecks corresponding to the costal grooves, few flecks on the sides, and a more prominent fleck in the lateral end of each gular fold.

== Habitat and conservation ==
Natural habitats of Pseudoeurycea melanomolga are pine forests and bunch grass above the tree line, at elevations of 2,250–4,000 m (7,380–13,120 ft) above sea level. It is a terrestrial species typically found under rocks and logs on moist soils. It tolerates some degree of habitat modification but is nevertheless threatened by habitat loss caused by logging, agriculture (including clearing for cattle and slash and burn practices), and human settlement. It is not known to occur in any protected area.
