= Pseudoeurycea tlahcuiloh =

Conservation status
- Critically Endangered (IUCN 3.1)

Scientific classification
- Kingdom: Animalia
- Phylum: Chordata
- Class: Amphibia
- Order: Urodela
- Family: Plethodontidae
- Genus: Pseudoeurycea
- Species: P. tlahcuiloh

Binomial name
- Pseudoeurycea tlahcuiloh Adler, 1996

Species of amphibian

Pseudoeurycea tlahcuiloh, commonly known as the green-flecked salamander, is a species of salamander in the family Plethodontidae. It is endemic to Mexico.

Its natural habitat is subtropical or tropical moist montane forests. It is threatened by habitat loss.
