= Dendrotriton megarhinus =

Conservation status
- Vulnerable (IUCN 3.1)

Scientific classification
- Kingdom: Animalia
- Phylum: Chordata
- Class: Amphibia
- Order: Urodela
- Family: Plethodontidae
- Genus: Dendrotriton
- Species: D. megarhinus

Binomial name
- Dendrotriton megarhinus (Rabb, 1960)

Synonyms
- Chiropterotriton megarhinus Rabb, 1960

Species of salamander

Dendrotriton megarhinus, also known as the longnose bromeliad salamander or long-nosed bromeliad salamander, is a species of salamander in the family Plethodontidae. It is endemic to southwestern Chiapas, Mexico, where it is only known from the Cerro Tres Picos, the type locality.

== Description ==
The type series consists of eight specimens. The three males that could be reliably sexed measure 25–33 mm (0.98–1.30 in) in snout–vent length. Similarly, the two females with reliable sex measure 23 and 26 mm (0.91 and 1.02 in) in snout–vent length. The tail is somewhat longer or equal to the body length, with the largest type measuring 72 mm (2.8 in) in total length. The snout is elongate and have extremely large nostrils (to which the specific name megarhinus refers). The body is slender. The digits have relatively broad tips and show a variable degree of webbing. The alcohol-preserved specimens are dorsally dark brown with some darker and light mottling along the middle of the back and tail. The venter is dirty cream.

== Habitat and conservation ==
The habitat of Dendrotriton megarhinus is cloud forest at an elevation of about 2,000 m (6,600 ft) above sea level. It lives in terrestrial bromeliads. It was common within its small range in the 1970s, but more recent information is lacking. There are no direct threats to this species but its small range renders it vulnerable to stochastic events. It is protected by law in Mexico and occurs in the La Sepultura Biosphere Reserve.

Dendrotriton megarhinus is only known from near Tonalá, Chiapas, Mexico.
