= Pseudoeurycea conanti =

Conservation status
- Endangered (IUCN 3.1)

Scientific classification
- Kingdom: Animalia
- Phylum: Chordata
- Class: Amphibia
- Order: Urodela
- Family: Plethodontidae
- Genus: Pseudoeurycea
- Species: P. conanti

Binomial name
- Pseudoeurycea conanti Bogert, 1967

Species of salamander

Pseudoeurycea conanti is a species of salamander in the family Plethodontidae. It is endemic to Oaxaca, Mexico.

Its natural habitats are subtropical or tropical dry forests, subtropical or tropical moist montane forests, plantations, and heavily degraded former forest. It is threatened by habitat loss.
