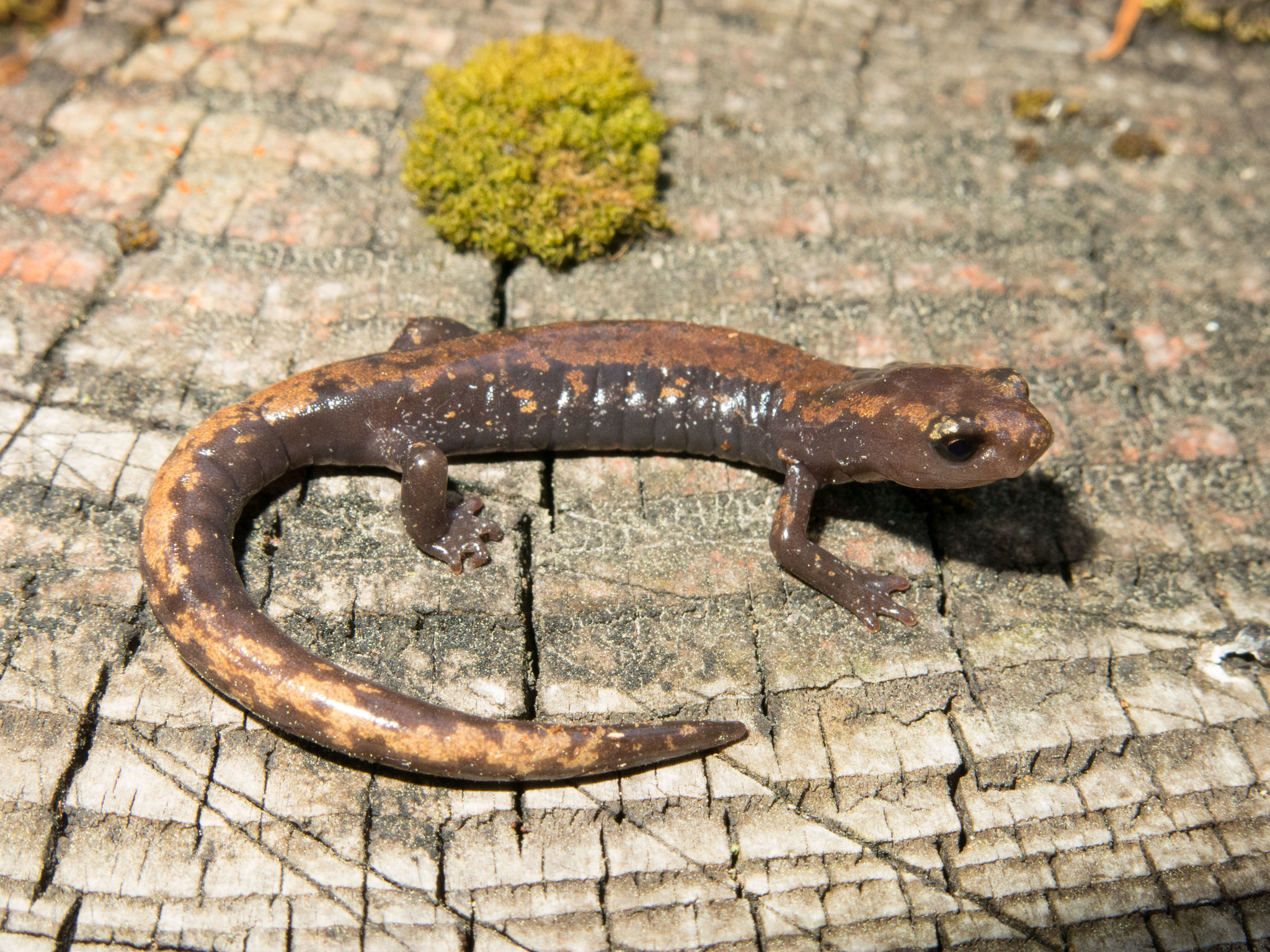

Conservation status
- Critically Endangered (IUCN 3.1)

Scientific classification
- Kingdom: Animalia
- Phylum: Chordata
- Class: Amphibia
- Order: Urodela
- Family: Plethodontidae
- Genus: Pseudoeurycea
- Species: P. robertsi

Binomial name
- Pseudoeurycea robertsi (Taylor, 1939)

Synonyms
- Oedipus robertsi Taylor, 1939 "1938"; Bolitoglossa robertsi (Taylor, 1939)

= Pseudoeurycea robertsi =

Species of amphibian

Pseudoeurycea robertsi is a species of salamander in the family Plethodontidae. It is endemic to Mexico and only known from the Nevado de Toluca, near Toluca in the State of Mexico. Its common name is Roberts' false brook salamander. The specific name robertsi honors the collector of the holotype, H. Radclyffe Roberts from the Philadelphia Academy of Sciences.

== Description ==
Females in the type series measured 35–51 mm (1.4–2.0 in) in snout–vent length; the sole male was 49 mm (1.9 in) in SVL. The tail is laterally compressed and almost equal to SVL or shorter. The head is broad, rather flattened, and with truncate snout. There is a broad, orange stripe on the back and tail. The limbs are well developed. The first digit is very short; there is no webbing.

There is a significant difference in the dorsal patterns of the Pseudoeurycea robertsi species, specifically in the number and size of the dorsal stripes. There was a total of seven patterns of dorsal stripes. The average adult size of the stripes was found to be around 89.15 mm and ranging from 38.7-117.9mm.

== Habitat and conservation ==
Pseudoeurycea robertsi is a terrestrial salamander living in pine-fir forests at elevations of 2,900–3,600 m (9,500–11,800 ft) above sea level. Specimens have been found under rocks, logs, and loose bark of fallen logs and stumps. It is relatively common but has declined in the past and has a small area of occurrence. Moreover, there are threats to its habitat from tourism, forestry, agricultural and livestock activities, and urbanisation: formerly a national park, Nevado de Toluca is now an Área de protección de Flora y Fauna, conferring a weaker conservation status.
