= Ixalotriton parvus =

Conservation status
- Critically Endangered (IUCN 3.1)

Scientific classification
- Kingdom: Animalia
- Phylum: Chordata
- Class: Amphibia
- Order: Urodela
- Family: Plethodontidae
- Genus: Ixalotriton
- Species: I. parvus

Binomial name
- Ixalotriton parvus (Lynch & Wake, 1989)

Synonyms
- Pseudoeurycea parva Lynch & Wake, 1989; Ixalotriton parva Raffaëlli, 2007

Species of amphibian

Ixalotriton parvus, the dwarf false brook salamander, is a species of salamander in the family Plethodontidae. It is endemic to a small mountainous area of Mexico where its natural habitat is subtropical or tropical moist montane forests. It is threatened by habitat loss.

== Description ==
The dwarf false brook salamander is small with a broad head, small nostrils, protruding eyes and slender body. It grows to a length of about 7.5 centimetres (3.0 in), half of which is the tail. It is a greyish-brown colour with a pale brown stripe running along the ridge of the back and a few whitish spots on the tail, which is prehensile. In appearance it is very similar to Aquiloeurycea praecellens.

== Distribution and habitat ==
The dwarf false brook salamander is endemic to the Cerro Baul Mountains in the eastern part of Oaxaca State, Mexico at an altitude of about 1,600 metres (5,200 ft) above sea level. It lives in virgin cloud forests and does not flourish after forestry operations have caused disturbance. It is a terrestrial species and is usually found in the water that collects in the centre of bromeliads.

== Biology ==
The dwarf false brook salamander has been little studied but the female is believed to lay several eggs in a concealed site at the beginning of the dry season. She then guards the eggs until they hatch into juvenile salamanders at the start of the rainy season, bypassing the aqueous larval stage.

== Status ==
The dwarf false brook salamander is listed as critically endangered on the IUCN Red List of Threatened Species. This is because its range is only about 10 square kilometres (3.9 sq mi) and the forest where it lives is being disturbed by logging. It was last surveyed in 2007 and on that occasion, a single specimen was found.
