= Pseudoeurycea firscheini =

Conservation status
- Endangered (IUCN 3.1)

Scientific classification
- Kingdom: Animalia
- Phylum: Chordata
- Class: Amphibia
- Order: Urodela
- Family: Plethodontidae
- Genus: Pseudoeurycea
- Species: P. firscheini

Binomial name
- Pseudoeurycea firscheini Shannon and Werler, 1955

Species of amphibian

Pseudoeurycea firscheini is a species of salamander in the family Plethodontidae. It is endemic to the Sierra Madre de Oaxaca of west-central Veracruz, Mexico, and known from Acultzingo (its type locality) on the Puebla–Veracruz border eastward to the Sierra Zongolica. It is also known as the Firschein's false brook salamander or simply Firschein's salamander. The specific name firscheini honors Mr. Irwin Lester Firschein, an American biologist, geneticists, and anthropologist. The authors acknowledge Firschein for his explorations on Volcan San Martin, said to "have done much toward stimulating interest in this region of Mexico".

== Description ==
Pseudoeurycea firscheini was described based on four specimens of unspecified sex, including the holotype measuring 47 mm (1.9 in) in snout–vent length and a juvenile measuring 23 mm (0.91 in) in snout–vent length and 47 mm (1.9 in) in total length. The adults have small, lichen-like light spots on the tail. The sides and the underparts of the body are almost black. The hind legs are relatively large. The fingers are less than half-webbed, whereas the slender toes are about one-third webbed.

== Habitat and conservation ==
Its natural habitats are pine-oak forests and lower cloud forests at elevations of 1,900–2,200 m (6,200–7,200 ft) above sea level. The type series was collected in water-filled bromeliads growing on trees at heights of 2.1–6.1 m (7–20 ft) above ground, and it appears to require the presence of abundant bromeliads growing on mature trees in its habitat.

The dependence of Pseudoeurycea firscheini on large bromeliad-covered trees makes it susceptible to habitat loss caused by expanding agriculture and human settlements and by wood extraction. The species might be present in the Cañón del Río Blanco National Park, but this has yet to be confirmed. Mexican law protects it under the "Special Protection" category.
