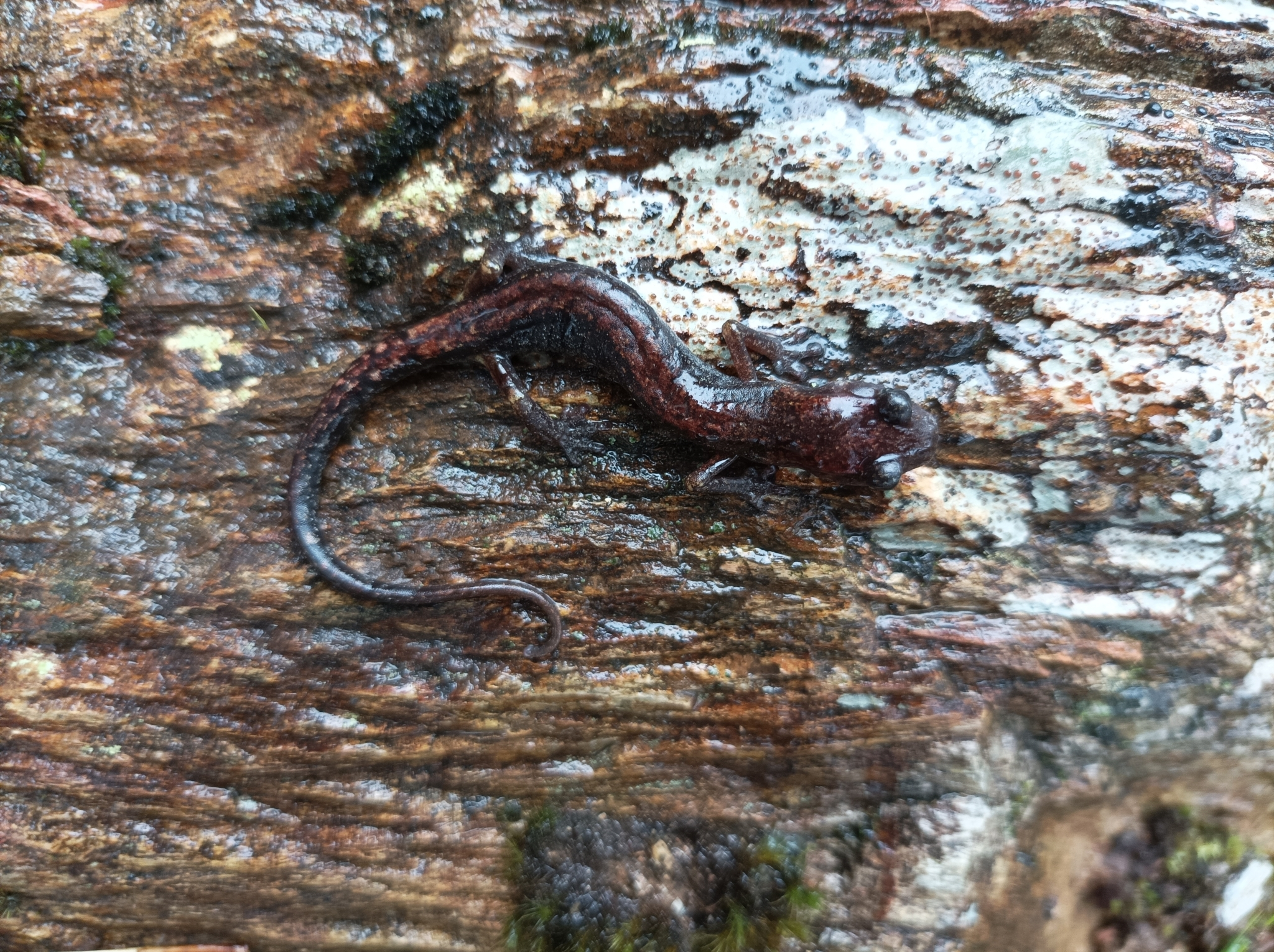

Conservation status
- Critically Endangered (IUCN 3.1)

Scientific classification
- Kingdom: Animalia
- Phylum: Chordata
- Class: Amphibia
- Order: Urodela
- Family: Plethodontidae
- Genus: Pseudoeurycea
- Species: P. unguidentis

Binomial name
- Pseudoeurycea unguidentis (Taylor, 1941)

Synonyms
- Bolitoglossa unguidentis Taylor, 1941

= Pseudoeurycea unguidentis =

Species of amphibian

Pseudoeurycea unguidentis is a species of salamander in the family Plethodontidae. It is endemic to northern Oaxaca, Mexico, where it is known from its type locality, Cerro San Felipe in the Sierra Madre de Oaxaca, and some other mountains, although the identity of animals from these other locations is uncertain. Its common names are claw-toothed salamander, clawtooth false brook salamander, and clawtoed false brook salamander.

Pseudoeurycea unguidentis measure about 6.4 cm (2.5 in) in snout–vent length and 14–15 cm (5.5–5.9 in) in total length. It has a brown and gray middorsal region, lacking a delineated middorsal stripe. The species' natural habitat is pine-oak and fir forests. It is a semi-arboreal species commonly found under logs. It tolerates some habitat modification. As of 2008, it had not been recorded since 1976 at the type locality. The reasons for the decline are unknown but probably involve habitat loss and modification; also climate change and chytridiomycosis may have played some role. The species' range includes the Benito Juárez National Park.
