= Pseudoeurycea nigromaculata =

Conservation status
- Endangered (IUCN 3.1)

Scientific classification
- Kingdom: Animalia
- Phylum: Chordata
- Class: Amphibia
- Order: Urodela
- Family: Plethodontidae
- Genus: Pseudoeurycea
- Species: P. nigromaculata

Binomial name
- Pseudoeurycea nigromaculata (Taylor, 1941)

Synonyms
- Bolitoglossa nigromaculata Taylor, 1941

Species of amphibian

Pseudoeurycea nigromaculata, commonly known as the black-spotted salamander or black-spotted false brook salamander is a species of salamander in the family Plethodontidae. It is endemic to Veracruz, Mexico, and known from Cerro Chicahuaxtla (1,300–1,600 m (4,300–5,200 ft) asl)) in Cuatlalpan (the type locality, near Fortín de las Flores) and from Volcán San Martín at elevations of 1,200–1,300 m (3,900–4,300 ft). These separate populations likely represent distinct species.

== Description ==
Pseudoeurycea nigromaculata is a medium-sized plethodontid: females in the type series (collected by Hobart Muir Smith) measure 51–57 mm (2.0–2.2 in) in snout–vent length. The tail is longer than the snout–vent length, giving a maximum total length of about 12 cm (4.7 in). The body is blackish (lighter in younger specimens), the tail has lighter coloration, and both carry black spots that have given the species its name.

Two observed egg clutches contained 19 and 25 eggs.

== Habitat and conservation ==
Pseudoeurycea nigromaculata is an arboreal species living in bromeliads in cloud forest. Once relatively common, it now appears to be very rare. Most of its habitat has disappeared or is severely degraded. It is protected by Mexican law under the "Special Protection" category.
