= Pseudoeurycea werleri =

Conservation status
- Endangered (IUCN 3.1)

Scientific classification
- Kingdom: Animalia
- Phylum: Chordata
- Class: Amphibia
- Order: Urodela
- Family: Plethodontidae
- Genus: Pseudoeurycea
- Species: P. werleri

Binomial name
- Pseudoeurycea werleri Darling & Smith, 1954

Species of amphibian

Pseudoeurycea werleri is a species of salamander in the family Plethodontidae. Its common name is Werler's false brook salamander or simply Werler's salamander. It is endemic to the Sierra de los Tuxtlas range in southern Veracruz state, Mexico. Its natural habitats are tropical rainforests and cloud forests where it lives in moss mats. It is threatened by habitat loss caused by subsistence agriculture, logging, and human settlement.
