= Pseudoeurycea anitae =

Conservation status
- Critically Endangered (IUCN 3.1)

Scientific classification
- Kingdom: Animalia
- Phylum: Chordata
- Class: Amphibia
- Order: Urodela
- Family: Plethodontidae
- Genus: Pseudoeurycea
- Species: P. anitae

Binomial name
- Pseudoeurycea anitae Bogert, 1967

Species of amphibian

Pseudoeurycea anitae, commonly known as Anita's false brook salamander or Anita's salamander, is a species of salamander in the family Plethodontidae. It is endemic to Mexico and only known from its type locality near San Vicente Lachixío, Oaxaca, in the Sierra Madre del Sur mountains, at about 2,100 m (6,900 ft) above sea level. The specific name anitae honors Anita Smith, a resident of Oaxaca City who helped Charles Mitchill Bogert when he was collecting in the surroundings of the city. This species might already be extinct.

== Description ==
The type series consists of three specimens, two females (one of them the holotype) measuring 47 and 50 mm (1.9 and 2.0 in) and a juvenile 24 mm (0.94 in) in snout–vent length. The tail is shorter than the body; the total length ranges between 43 and 92 mm (1.7 and 3.6 in). The limbs are well developed with webbed fingers and toes. The head, the middle of the trunk, and the tail are dark brown in their upper surfaces, flanked by two irregular rows of dark spots or bars. The throat and venter are white, with faint mottling on the belly and the underside of the tail.

== Habitat and conservation ==
Its natural habitats are pine-oak forests. It has been found in sinkholes, crevices and caves; it only occurs in moist places. It is threatened by habitat loss due to logging and development. The known habitat has largely disappeared and dried out. As of 2016, the species has not been observed since 1976, despite searches.
