= Pseudoeurycea gadovii =

Conservation status
- Vulnerable (IUCN 3.1)

Scientific classification
- Kingdom: Animalia
- Phylum: Chordata
- Class: Amphibia
- Order: Urodela
- Family: Plethodontidae
- Genus: Pseudoeurycea
- Species: P. gadovii

Binomial name
- Pseudoeurycea gadovii (Dunn, 1926)

Synonyms
- Oedipus gadovii Dunn, 1926; Bolitoglossa gadovii (Dunn, 1926)

Species of salamander

Pseudoeurycea gadovii, commonly known as Gadow's false brook salamander or Gadow's salamander, is a species of salamander in the family Plethodontidae. It is endemic to Mexico and occurs on and near the volcanoes Pico de Orizaba and Cofre de Perote in central region of Veracruz as well as on the slopes of La Malinche on the Tlaxcala-Puebla border.

Its natural habitats are pine-oak forests and bunchgrass above the treeline. Its altitudinal range is 2,250–4,250 m (7,380–13,940 ft) above sea level. It is a terrestrial species typically found hidden in burrows or under rotten logs or big rocks. It is threatened by habitat loss caused by logging, especially at lower elevations. All the volcanoes it is known from host national parks.
