= Pseudoeurycea tenchalli =

Conservation status
- Critically Endangered (IUCN 3.1)

Scientific classification
- Kingdom: Animalia
- Phylum: Chordata
- Class: Amphibia
- Order: Urodela
- Family: Plethodontidae
- Genus: Pseudoeurycea
- Species: P. tenchalli

Binomial name
- Pseudoeurycea tenchalli Adler, 1996

Species of amphibian

Pseudoeurycea tenchalli, commonly known as the bearded salamander, is a species of salamander in the family Plethodontidae. It is endemic to Cerro Teotepec (Sierra Madre del Sur) in Guerrero state, Mexico.

Pseudoeurycea tenchalli is terrestrial salamander that lives in pine–oak forests (altitude about 2,650 m (8,690 ft) asl), hiding in logs and other debris. There is some logging in its remote but small distribution area that constitutes a threat to this little-known species.
