= Muscular salamander =

Conservation status
- Endangered (IUCN 3.1)

Scientific classification
- Kingdom: Animalia
- Phylum: Chordata
- Class: Amphibia
- Order: Urodela
- Family: Plethodontidae
- Genus: Pseudoeurycea
- Species: P. papenfussi

Binomial name
- Pseudoeurycea papenfussi Parra-Olea, García-París, Hanken & Wake, 2005

Species of amphibian

The muscular salamander (Pseudoeurycea papenfussi), also known commonly as la salamandra escaladora in Mexican Spanish, is a species of salamander in the family Plethodontidae. The species is endemic to Mexico.

== Etymology ==
The specific name, papenfussi, is in honor of American herpetologist Theodore Johnstone Papenfuss.

== Habitat ==
The preferred natural habitats of Pseudoeurycea papenfussi are subtropical or tropical dry forests and rocky areas, at elevations of 2,800–2,900 m (9,200–9,500 ft).

== Conservation status ==
Pseudoeurycea papenfussi is threatened by habitat loss.
