= Pseudoeurycea orchileucos =

Conservation status
- Endangered (IUCN 3.1)

Scientific classification
- Kingdom: Animalia
- Phylum: Chordata
- Class: Amphibia
- Order: Urodela
- Family: Plethodontidae
- Genus: Pseudoeurycea
- Species: P. orchileucos

Binomial name
- Pseudoeurycea orchileucos (Brodie, Mendelson, and Campbell, 2002)

Synonyms
- Lineatriton orchileucos Brodie, Mendelson, and Campbell, 2002

Species of amphibian

Pseudoeurycea orchileucos, commonly known as the Sierra de Juárez worm salamander, is a species of salamander in the family Plethodontidae. It is endemic to Oaxaca, Mexico, where it is known from the northern slopes of Sierra de Juarez at elevations of 800–1,390 m (2,620–4,560 ft) above sea level.

== Description ==
Males measure 30–33 mm (1.2–1.3 in) in snout–vent length. The average tail length is 60 mm (2.4 in). The head is about as wide as the body; the eyes are protuberant. There are 13 costal grooves. The specific name orchileucos, from the Greek orchis (=testicle) and leukos (=white), refers to the white color of the outer epithelial layer of the testes and vasa deferentia in adult males (the latter might have scattered melanocytes). This trait distinguishes it from Pseudoeurycea orchimelas with black testes and vasa deferentia.

== Habitat and conservation ==
Natural habitats of Pseudoeurycea orchileucos are cloud forests. They live in leaf litter terrestrially and fossorially; most specimens have been recovered by turning rocks and stones or in and under rotting logs. The species is threatened by habitat loss (deforestation) caused by expanding subsistence farming and human settlements and by logging. It is a rare, poorly known species.
