= Pseudoeurycea smithi =

Conservation status
- Critically Endangered (IUCN 3.1)

Scientific classification
- Kingdom: Animalia
- Phylum: Chordata
- Class: Amphibia
- Order: Urodela
- Family: Plethodontidae
- Genus: Pseudoeurycea
- Species: P. smithi

Binomial name
- Pseudoeurycea smithi (Taylor, 1938)

Species of amphibian

Pseudoeurycea smithi, commonly known as Smith's false brook salamander, is a species of salamander in the family Plethodontidae. It is endemic to certain mountainous regions of Mexico. Its natural habitat is subtropical or tropical moist montane forests. It is threatened by habitat loss.

== Description ==
Smith's false brook salamander is a large species that can grow to 14.6 centimetres (5.7 in), half of which is tail. It has a wide head and large paratoid glands behind the eyes. There are twelve to fifteen costal grooves on either side of the body and the tail is prehensile and has a constriction at its base. The limbs are slender and the fingers and toes completely or partially webbed. The back is dark brown, the sides olive brown with black bars and the belly pale. The chin is cream coloured with brown speckles and the sides of the tail have black spots.

== Distribution and habitat ==
Pseudoeurycea smithi occurs in several mountain ranges in north west Oaxaca State, Mexico, at an altitude of between 2,500 and 3,000 metres (8,200 and 9,800 ft) above sea level. Its natural habitat is pine forests and it is often found hidden under loose bark on fallen logs. In the past it has demonstrated that it can adapt to living in secondary forest after destruction of the virgin forest.

== Biology ==
Smith's false brook salamander is a terrestrial species. Little is known of the breeding habits of this species but the female is believed to brood the eggs and they hatch directly into juvenile salamanders with no intervening larval stage.

== Status ==
The IUCN Red List of Threatened Species lists this species as "Critically Endangered". At one time it was very common within its range but had declined in numbers by more than eighty percent by 2004. Although logging, changing agricultural practices and human activities have taken place in the mountains where it lives, good quality habitat still exists and these factors do not fully explain the decline in population size, the cause of which remains a mystery. Some of the range is within the bounds of the Parque Nacional Benito Juarez which makes conservation easier. Research is needed to discover the causes of the population collapse.
