= Pseudoeurycea altamontana =

Conservation status
- Endangered (IUCN 3.1)

Scientific classification
- Kingdom: Animalia
- Phylum: Chordata
- Class: Amphibia
- Order: Urodela
- Family: Plethodontidae
- Genus: Pseudoeurycea
- Species: P. altamontana

Binomial name
- Pseudoeurycea altamontana (Taylor, 1939)

Synonyms
- Oedipus altamontanus Taylor, 1939 "1938"; Bolitoglossa altamontana (Taylor, 1939)

Species of amphibian

Pseudoeurycea altamontana, commonly known as the Morelos salamander or Morelos false brook salamander, is a species of salamander in the family Plethodontidae. It is endemic to central Mexico and known from its type locality, Lake Zempoala and from the west slope of Popocatépetl, in the state of Morelos, the extreme east of Mexico State, and southern Mexico City.

== Description ==
The two specimens in the type series measured 40 and 49 mm (1.6 and 1.9 in) in snout–vent length; the larger specimen (holotype) had a 47 mm (1.9 in) tail. The head is relatively large. The fingers are nearly free from webbing. There are 12 costal folds. Living individuals have striking violet-purplish color in their head and body, with creamy markings and mottling.

== Habitat and conservation ==
Its natural habitats are pine, pine-oak and fir forests at around 3,000 m (9,800 ft) above sea level. It is terrestrial species found under the bark of logs and stumps. It is threatened by habitat loss. It is found in the Lagunas de Zempoala National Park, but habitat loss is also occurring within this protected area.
