= Pseudoeurycea orchimelas =

Conservation status
- Endangered (IUCN 3.1)

Scientific classification
- Kingdom: Animalia
- Phylum: Chordata
- Class: Amphibia
- Order: Urodela
- Family: Plethodontidae
- Genus: Pseudoeurycea
- Species: P. orchimelas

Binomial name
- Pseudoeurycea orchimelas (Brodie, Mendelson, and Campbell, 2002)

Synonyms
- Lineatriton orchimelas Brodie, Mendelson, and Campbell, 2002

Species of amphibian

Pseudoeurycea orchimelas, commonly known as the San Martin worm salamander, is a species of salamander in the family Plethodontidae. It is endemic to Veracruz, Mexico, where it is known from the Sierra de los Tuxtlas at elevations of 100–1,300 m (330–4,270 ft) above sea level.

== Description ==
Males measure 27–33 mm (1.1–1.3 in) and females 33–37 mm (1.3–1.5 in) in snout–vent length. The average tail length is 51 and 68 mm (2.0 and 2.7 in) for males and females, respectively. The head is wider than the body; the eyes are protuberant. There are ten costal grooves. The specific name orchimelas, from the Greek orchis (=testicle) and melas (=black), refers to the black pigmentation of the outer epithelial layer of the testes and vasa deferentia in adult males. This trait distinguishes it from Pseudoeurycea orchileucos with white testes and vasa deferentia.

== Habitat and conservation ==
Natural habitats of Pseudoeurycea orchimelas are lowland wet forests. They live in leaf litter terrestrially and fossorially. The species is threatened by habitat loss (deforestation) caused by expanding subsistence farming and human settlements and by logging. It is quite an abundant species but secretive.
