= Pseudoeurycea lineola =

Conservation status
- Endangered (IUCN 3.1)

Scientific classification
- Kingdom: Animalia
- Phylum: Chordata
- Class: Amphibia
- Order: Urodela
- Family: Plethodontidae
- Genus: Pseudoeurycea
- Species: P. lineola

Binomial name
- Pseudoeurycea lineola (Cope, 1865)

Synonyms
- Spelerpes lineolus Cope, 1865; Lineatriton lineolus (Cope, 1865)

Species of amphibian

Pseudoeurycea lineola, commonly known as the Veracruz worm salamander or Mexican slender salamander, is a species of salamander in the family Plethodontidae. It is endemic to the eastern slope of the Trans-Mexican Volcanic Belt near Cuautlapan, in the west-central Veracruz, Mexico, at elevations of 800–1,250 m (2,620–4,100 ft) above sea level. Molecular evidence suggests that it consists of two distinct species. It was the type species of genus Lineatriton.

== Description ==
Males measure 35–43 mm (1.4–1.7 in) and females 34–44 mm (1.3–1.7 in) in snout–vent length. The average tail length is 71 and 73 mm (2.8 and 2.9 in) for males and females, respectively. The males have white (unpigemented) testes and vasa deferentia.

== Habitat and conservation ==
Natural habitats of Pseudoeurycea lineola are pine-oak forests, but it can also survive in shaded coffee plantations. It is a terrestrial species found beneath stones, logs and other debris, and in subterranean situations. The species is threatened by habitat loss caused by expanding agriculture and human settlements and by wood extraction. It is an uncommon species that is difficult to find.
