= Pseudoeurycea teotepec =

Conservation status
- Critically Endangered (IUCN 3.1)

Scientific classification
- Kingdom: Animalia
- Phylum: Chordata
- Class: Amphibia
- Order: Urodela
- Family: Plethodontidae
- Genus: Pseudoeurycea
- Species: P. teotepec

Binomial name
- Pseudoeurycea teotepec Adler, 1996

Species of amphibian

Pseudoeurycea teotepec, commonly known as the Teotepec salamander, is a species of salamander in the family Plethodontidae. It is endemic to Mexico and only known from its type locality, southern slope of Cerro Teotepec (Sierra Madre del Sur) in Guerrero, at about 3,425 m (11,237 ft) asl.

== Description ==
The type series consists of a single female (holotype) that measures 62 mm (2.4 in) in snout–vent length; the tail is relatively short at 51 mm (2.0 in). The body is thick with short limbs. The dorsum is black with slightly greenish, cream-colored iridophore patches that are most pronounced on sides of body, limbs, and on entire length of tail. The venter is black with some tiny, widely scattered, cream-colored iridophore patches, the largest one is at the tip of the tail.

== Habitat and conservation ==
The species inhabits moist areas with abundant moss in pine-fir forests. The holotype was found under a moist log.

The species has not been recorded after 1960s when it was first discovered, despite repeated later searches. It appears to have declined significantly. Logging has taken place on Cerro Teotepec; logging and expanding small scale agriculture are possible future threats.
