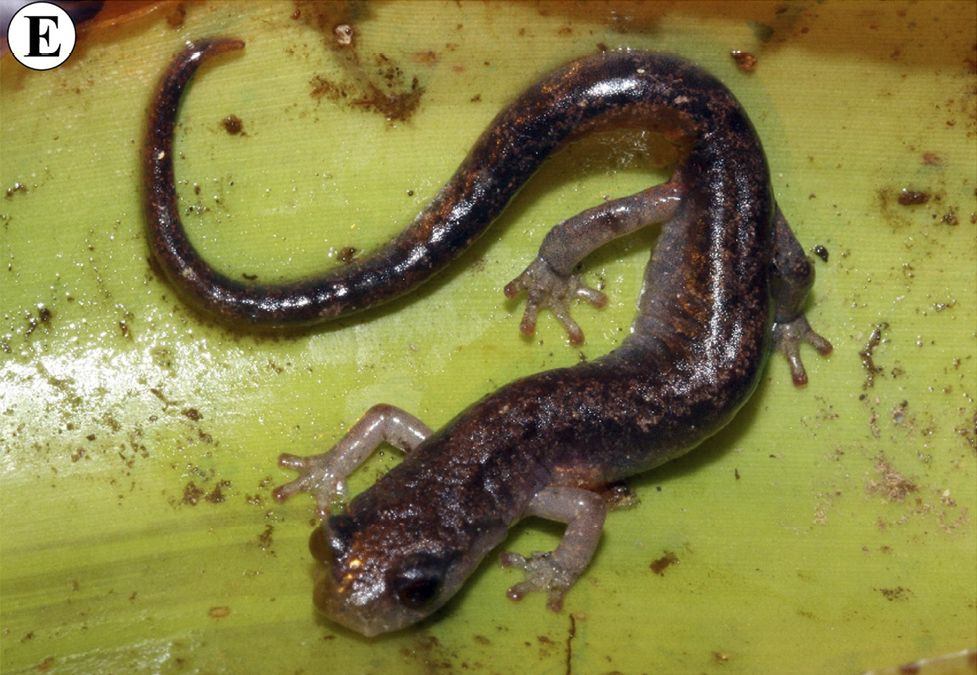
- Specimen from near Plan de Guadalupe

Conservation status
- Endangered (IUCN 3.1)

Scientific classification
- Kingdom: Animalia
- Phylum: Chordata
- Class: Amphibia
- Order: Urodela
- Family: Plethodontidae
- Genus: Pseudoeurycea
- Species: P. ruficauda

Binomial name
- Pseudoeurycea ruficauda Parra-Olea, García-París, Hanken, and Wake, 2004

= Pseudoeurycea ruficauda =

Species of salamander

Pseudoeurycea ruficauda, also known as the orange-tailed agile salamander, is a species of salamander in the family Plethodontidae. It is endemic to the Sierra Mazateca, a part of Sierra Madre de Oaxaca of Mexico. The specific name ruficauda derives from the Latin words rufous (=reddish) and cauda (=tail) and refers to the reddish orange tail of this salamander. P. jaguar is its closest relative.

== Description ==
Pseudoeurycea ruficauda can grow to 45 mm (1.8 in) in snout–vent length (SVL). The tail is slightly shorter than SVL in most individuals. The head is relatively large with large, protruding eyes. The body is slender and the legs are long. The hands and feet are broadly spread and have long, separated digits. Dorsal coloration is orange-tan with coppery-gold highlights mixed with black. The dorsal stripe is irregular and sometimes interrupted; its color varies from tan-yellow to orange to reddish brown. The tail is orange with black spots and a vivid, red-orange to yellow-orange tip.

== Habitat and conservation ==
Pseudoeurycea ruficauda occurs in moist, mixed pine and oak forest at elevations of 2,235–2,290 m (7,333–7,513 ft) above sea level. It is arboreal and can be found under the bark of logs, in epiphytes, and in stone crevices. Presumably, development is direct (i.e., there is no free-living larval stage).

Although common within its known range consisting of only two localities, the quantity and quality of its habitat are declining because of small-scale farming and wood extraction. It is not known to occur in any protected areas.
