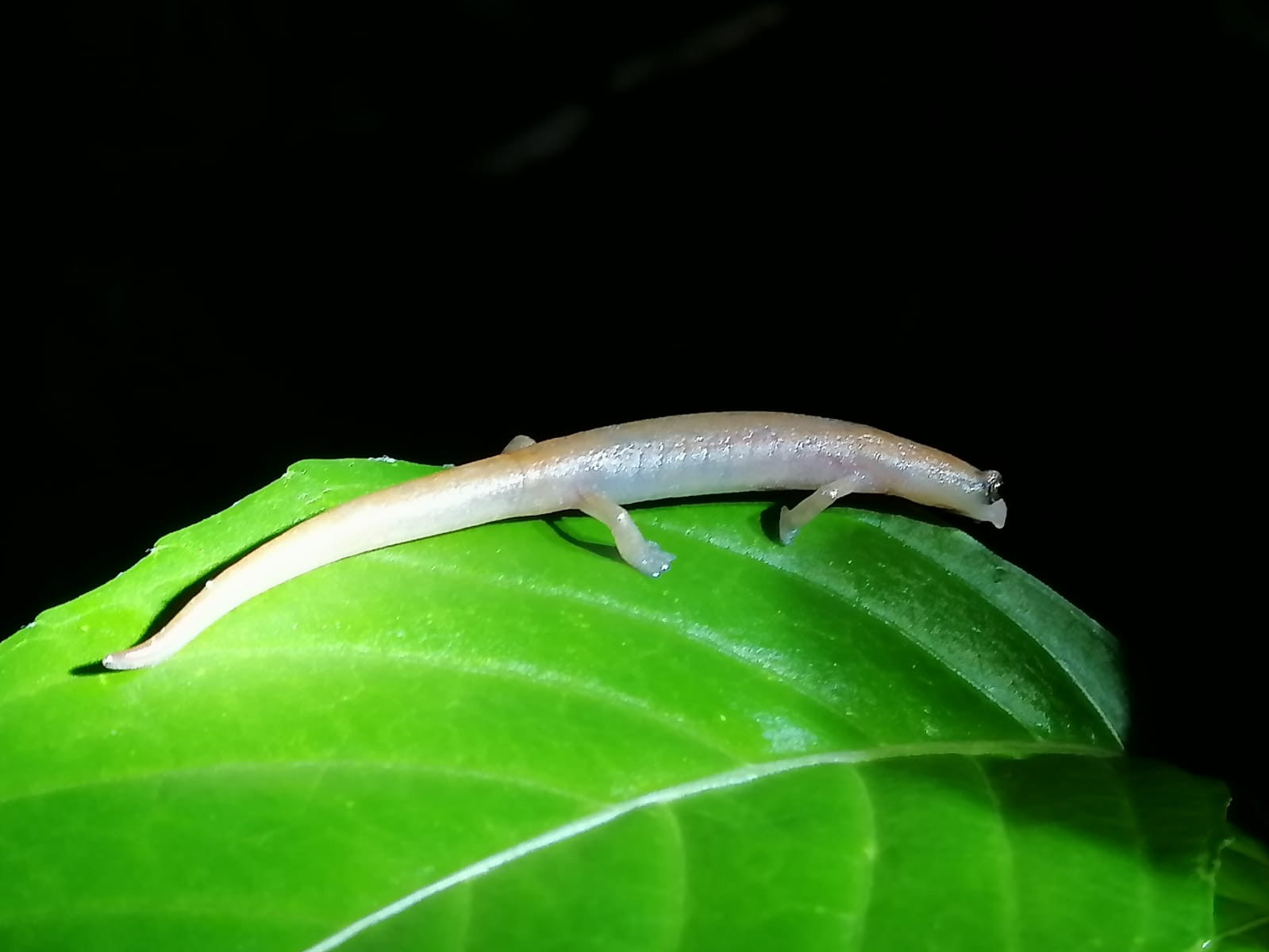

Conservation status
- Least Concern (IUCN 3.1)

Scientific classification
- Kingdom: Animalia
- Phylum: Chordata
- Class: Amphibia
- Order: Urodela
- Family: Plethodontidae
- Genus: Bolitoglossa
- Species: B. occidentalis

Binomial name
- Bolitoglossa occidentalis Taylor, 1941

Synonyms
- Bolitoglossa bilineata Lynch & Smith, 1966

= Southern banana salamander =

Species of amphibian

The southern banana salamander (Bolitoglossa occidentalis) is a species of salamander in the family Plethodontidae. It is found in Guatemala, Honduras, and Mexico. Its natural habitats are subtropical or tropical moist lowland forests, subtropical or tropical moist montane forests, arable land, and plantations. It is threatened by habitat loss.

== Reproduction ==
Research is currently uncertain as to how specific factors influence the southern banana salamander's breeding cycle. Their climate has been shown to affect the cycle, but it's currently believed that the salamander's microhabitat and nearby environment are a more significant factor.
