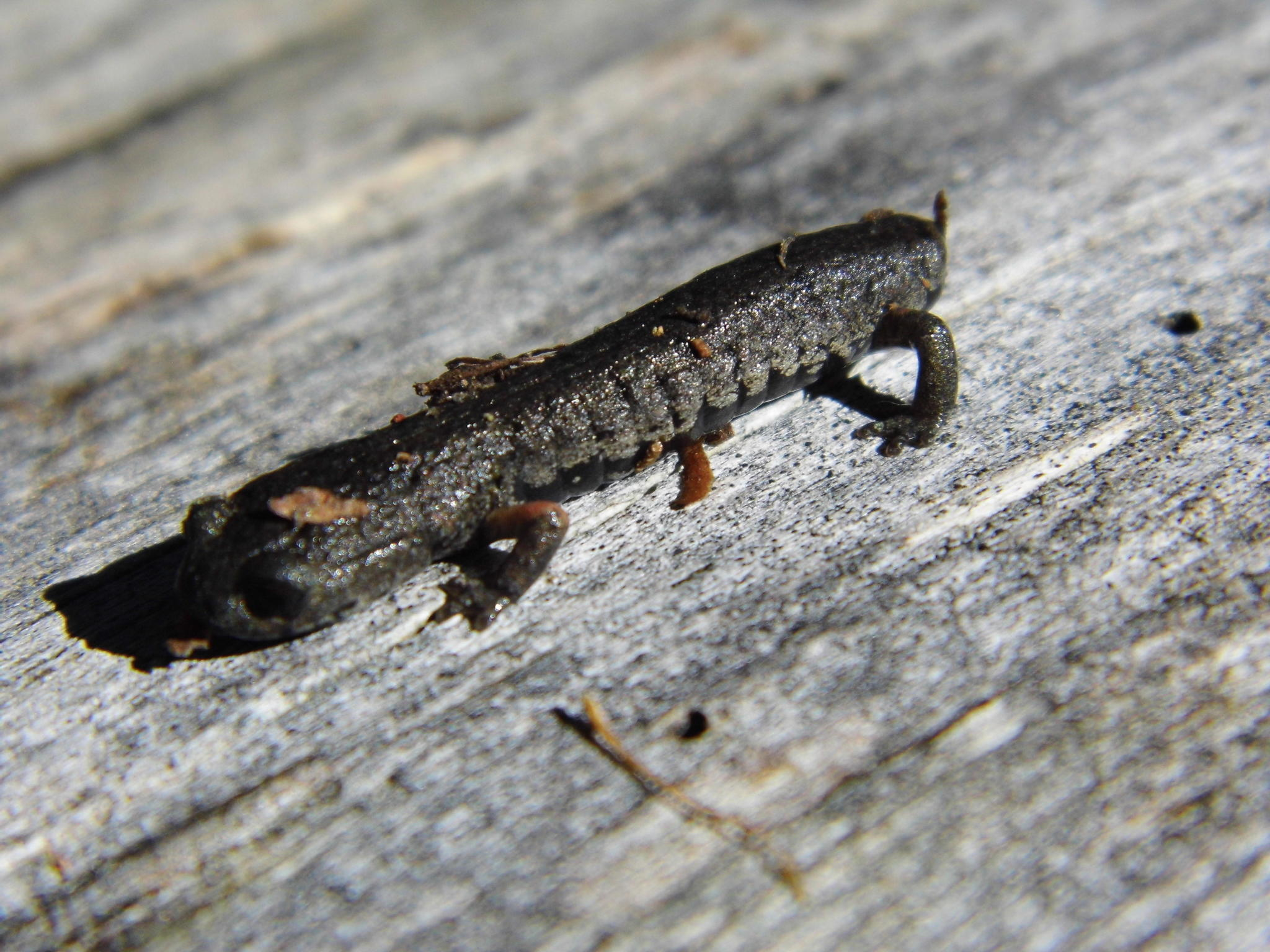
- P. cochranae in Oaxaca, Mexico

Conservation status
- Vulnerable (IUCN 3.1)

Scientific classification
- Kingdom: Animalia
- Phylum: Chordata
- Class: Amphibia
- Order: Urodela
- Family: Plethodontidae
- Genus: Pseudoeurycea
- Species: P. cochranae

Binomial name
- Pseudoeurycea cochranae (Taylor, 1943)

= Pseudoeurycea cochranae =

Species of salamander

Pseudoeurycea cochranae is a species of salamander in the family Plethodontidae. It is endemic to the Sierra Madre del Sur and Sierra Madre de Oaxaca of central and west-central Oaxaca, Mexico.

== Etymology ==
The specific name cochranae honors Doris Mable Cochran, an American herpetologist.

== Habitat ==
Its natural habitats are pine and pine-oak forests at elevations of 2,200–2,700 m (7,200–8,900 ft) above sea level. It is a terrestrial salamander that hides under bark and in leaf-litter. It tolerates some degree of habitat disturbance and is sometimes found in rural gardens and selectively logged lots. It is threatened by habitat loss caused by extensive agricultural expansion, human settlements, and logging.
