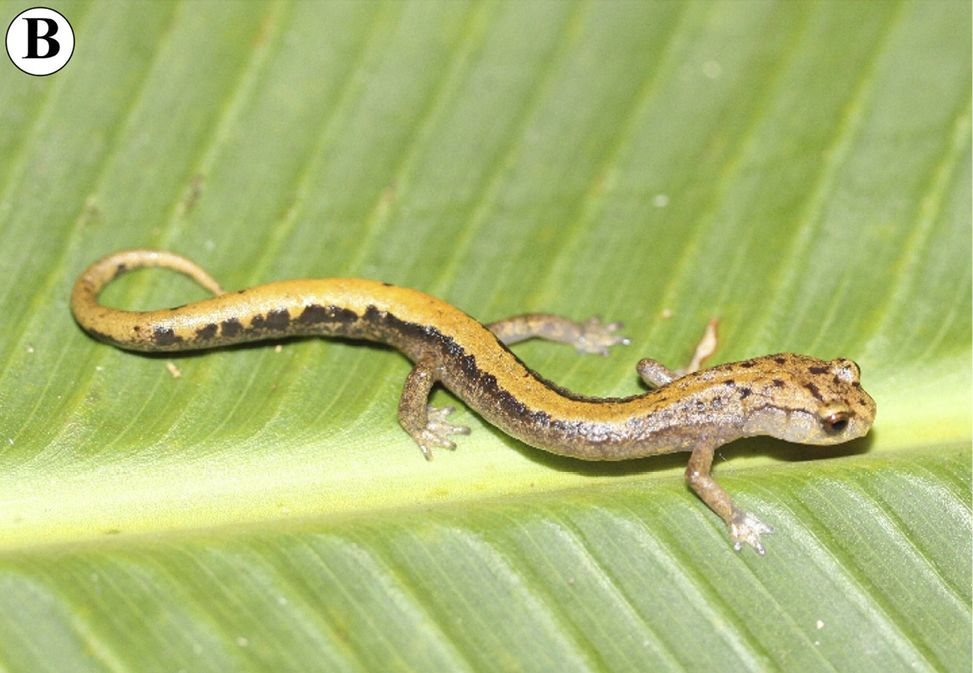

Conservation status
- Critically Endangered (IUCN 3.1)

Scientific classification
- Kingdom: Animalia
- Phylum: Chordata
- Class: Amphibia
- Order: Urodela
- Family: Plethodontidae
- Genus: Pseudoeurycea
- Species: P. saltator

Binomial name
- Pseudoeurycea saltator Lynch and Wake, 1989

= Pseudoeurycea saltator =

Species of salamander

Pseudoeurycea saltator is a species of salamander in the family Plethodontidae. It is endemic to Oaxaca, Mexico, and only known from the northern slopes of the Sierra de Juarez above Vista Hermosa.

Its natural habitats are evergreen cloud forests at elevations of 1,500–2,000 m (4,900–6,600 ft) above sea level. It is primarily an arboreal species living in bromeliads, but it can sometimes be found on the ground or under logs and bark. It is threatened by habitat loss caused by expanding agriculture and logging.
