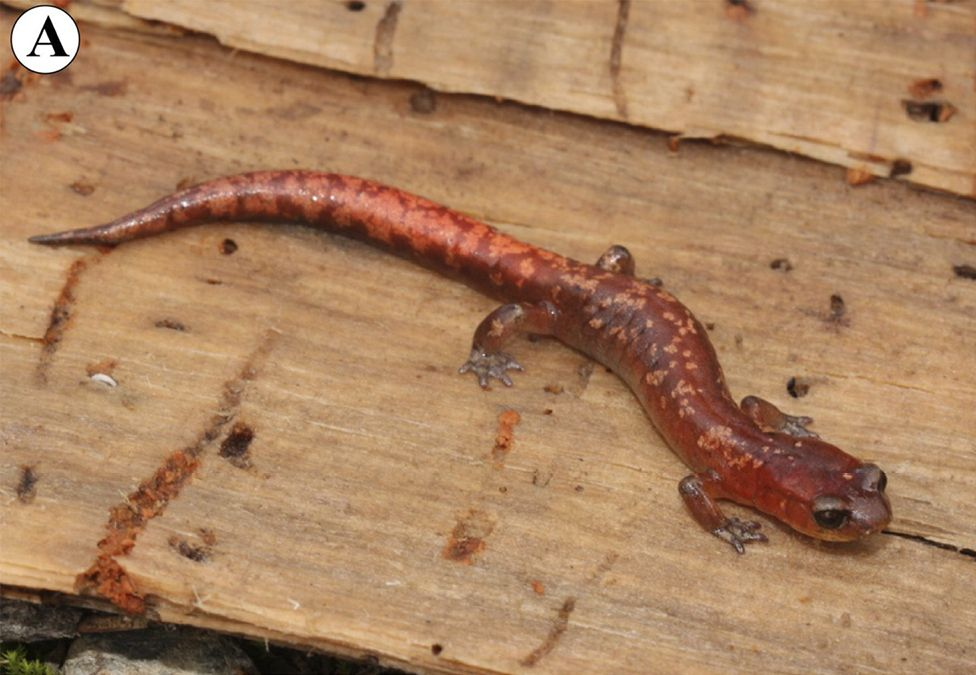

Conservation status
- Critically Endangered (IUCN 3.1)

Scientific classification
- Kingdom: Animalia
- Phylum: Chordata
- Class: Amphibia
- Order: Urodela
- Family: Plethodontidae
- Genus: Pseudoeurycea
- Species: P. aurantia

Binomial name
- Pseudoeurycea aurantia Canseco-Márquez and Parra-Olea, 2003

= Pseudoeurycea aurantia =

Species of amphibian

Pseudoeurycea aurantia, commonly known as Peña Verde salamander, is a species of salamander in the family Plethodontidae. It is endemic to Oaxaca, Mexico and only known from its type locality near Peña Verde, which is the northernmost high peak in the Sierra de Juárez.

== Description ==
Two males in the type series measured about 43 mm (1.7 in) in snout–vent length and eight females 39–52 mm (1.5–2.0 in) in snout–vent length. The habitus is relatively robust. The head is relatively broad. The snout is broadly rounded but more truncate in males than in females. The limbs are relatively long, with well-developed hands and feet with comparatively long and slender digits. The dorsal ground color is reddish brown, grading to pale yellow ventrally. There is a broad and conspicuous orange mid-dorsal stripe that runs from the scapular region to the tip of the tail; in the head region, this dorsal stripe is broken into darker flecks. There are bright yellow spots all over the dorsum but they are more concentrated on the tail. The underside of the body and tail is uniform pale yellow, without spots.

== Habitat and conservation ==
Pseudoeurycea aurantia occur in pine cloud forests and in barren open lands at higher altitudes; the altitudinal range is 2,744–2,805 m (9,003–9,203 ft) above sea level. It has been found under rocks, the bark of logs, and in or under decaying wood. Reproduction is through direct development; one female was found guarding a clutch of 22 eggs under the bark of a log.

The species is extremely common within its small range. However, there are threats to its habitat from forest fires, timber extraction, and small-scale farming, which keeps moving uphill. The IUCN SSC Amphibian Specialist Group underscores that habitat protection is urgently required for this species.
