= Craugastor phasma =

Conservation status
- Critically Endangered (IUCN 3.1)

Scientific classification
- Kingdom: Animalia
- Phylum: Chordata
- Class: Amphibia
- Order: Anura
- Family: Craugastoridae
- Genus: Craugastor
- Subgenus: Craugastor
- Species: C. phasma

Binomial name
- Craugastor phasma (Lips and Savage, 1996)

Synonyms
- Eleutherodactylus phasma Lips and Savage, 1996

Species of frog

Craugastor phasma is a species of frog in the family Craugastoridae. It is endemic to southeastern Costa Rica and only known from its type locality in the Las Tablas protected area in the Puntarenas Province, near the Panamanian border. Only a single individual—the holotype collected in 1992—has ever been observed. It is unusual in its ghost-like, gray-white coloration, and it was initially thought that the specimen was an albino form of some other species. However, the specimen is also morphologically distinct, although some uncertainty regarding the validity of this species remains.

== Etymology ==
The specific name phasma is Greek for "apparition" or "spirit" and refers to the ghost-like appearance of this species.

== Taxonomy and systematics ==
Based on morphological data, Savage and colleagues (2004) suggested that the sister species of Craugastor phasma is Craugastor talamancae, a lowland species. Later studies have grouped Craugastor phasma with montane species in the Craugastor melanostictus species group.

== Description ==
The holotype, an adult female, measures 48 mm (1.9 in) in snout–vent length. Apart from the black eyes and scattered black markings on the head and hind limbs, the dorsal and ventral surfaces are uniformly gray-white. Skin is smooth. The head is slightly broader than it is wide. The snout is obtuse in profile. The canthus rostralis is sharp. The tympanum is ovoid and distinct. The fingers and toes bear disks. The toes have basal webbing.

Craugastor phasma is only known from the Las Tablas protected area in the Puntarenas Province, Costa Rica

== Habitat and conservation ==
The holotype was found on a rocky stream bank in lower montane rainforest at 1,850 m (6,070 ft) above sea level. The site was part of a transect that was regularly monitored for two years, but no other specimens were observed.

The type locality is within the La Amistad Biosphere Reserve. However, the holotype was sick and observed among dead and dying frogs, so disease is a possible, immediate threat to this species.
