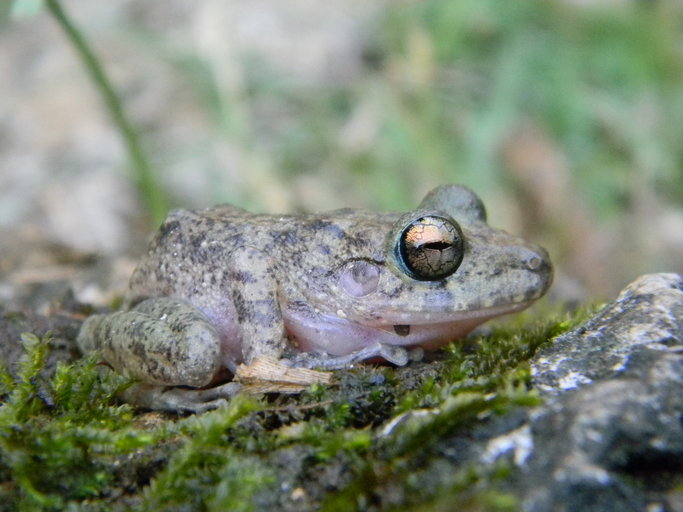

Conservation status
- Critically Endangered (IUCN 3.1)

Scientific classification
- Kingdom: Animalia
- Phylum: Chordata
- Class: Amphibia
- Order: Anura
- Family: Craugastoridae
- Genus: Craugastor
- Subgenus: Craugastor
- Species: C. pozo

Binomial name
- Craugastor pozo (Johnson and Savage, 1995)

Synonyms
- Eleutherodactylus pozo Johnson and Savage, 1995

= Craugastor pozo =

Species of frog

Craugastor pozo is a species of frog in the family Craugastoridae. It is endemic to Mexico and known from the western foothills and highlands of Chiapas. The specific name pozo refers to the local name of the area near its type locality, El Pozo (sometimes also known as Pozo Turipache and Pozo La Pera). Common name Pozo Turipache rainfrog has been coined for it.

== Description ==
Males measure 37–48 mm (1.5–1.9 in) and females 46–81 mm (1.8–3.2 in) in snout–vent length. The canthus rostralis is sharp and tympanum is distinct. The dorsum is brown, typically with a few black streaks or spots associated with the poorly developed parietal and suprascapular ridges. The prefrontal area is pale brown, separated from the back of the head by an interorbital bar. There are usually conspicuous dark lip and limb bars. The supratympanic ridge has black lower edge. The flanks are cream with bold dark brown mottling or marbling. Large adult males have vocal slits.

Before being recognized as representing a separate species, Craugastor pozo were identified as Craugastor brocchi.

== Habitat and conservation ==
The species' natural habitats are wet forest areas at elevations of 700–1,200 m (2,300–3,900 ft) above sea level. They occur on the forest floor under leaf-litter among limestone boulders and limestone caves. They hide by day and are active on the forest floor and in low vegetation by night. This rare species is threatened by habitat loss. It is not known to occur in any protected area.
