= Craugastor guerreroensis =

Conservation status
- Endangered (IUCN 3.1)

Scientific classification
- Kingdom: Animalia
- Phylum: Chordata
- Class: Amphibia
- Order: Anura
- Family: Craugastoridae
- Genus: Craugastor
- Species: C. guerreroensis

Binomial name
- Craugastor guerreroensis (Lynch, 1967)

Synonyms
- Eleutherodactylus guerreroensis Lynch, 1967

Species of frog in the family Craugastoridae endemic to Mexico

Craugastor guerreroensis, also known as the Guerreran robber frog, is a species of frog in the family Craugastoridae. It is endemic to Mexico and only known from its type locality near Agua del Obispo, in the municipality of Chilpancingo de los Bravo, Guerrero.

== Description ==
Craugastor guerreroensis was described based a type series consisting of three adult males measuring 32–40 mm (1.3–1.6 in) in snout–vent length. The head is as wide as the body and broader than long; the snout is subacuminate. The canthus rostralis is moderately sharp. The tympanum is visible and large. The fingers are long and thin with wide finger pads. The innermost toes have slight webbing; the toe tips are enlarged. The coloration is gray with some greenish tinge. There is some darker brown dorsal blotching. The venter is cream yellow.

Craugastor guerreroensis is only known from near Agua del Obispo in Guerrero, Mexico

== Habitat and conservation ==
The species' natural habitat is pine-oak forest at elevations of 980 m (3,220 ft) above sea level. It is a rare frog that appears to have declined as it has not been seen after 1984, despite surveys to locate it; it might be extinct. is threatened by habitat loss caused by logging and conversion of forest to agricultural land. However, it has also disappeared from suitable habitat, suggesting that chytridiomycosis might have been at play.
