= Craugastor rupinius =

Conservation status
- Least Concern (IUCN 3.1)

Scientific classification
- Kingdom: Animalia
- Phylum: Chordata
- Class: Amphibia
- Order: Anura
- Family: Craugastoridae
- Genus: Craugastor
- Species: C. rupinius

Binomial name
- Craugastor rupinius (Campbell and Savage, 2000)

Synonyms
- Eleutherodactylus rupinius Campbell and Savage, 2000

Species of amphibian

Craugastor rupinius is a species of frogs in the family Craugastoridae. It is found in the southeastern Mexico (Chiapas), southern Guatemala, El Salvador, and western Honduras. Common name cliffy stream frog has been coined for it.

== Etymology ==
The specific name rupinius is from Latin rupina, meaning "rocky chasm", in reference to the rocky stream environments this species inhabits.

== Description ==
Adult males grow to 40 mm (1.6 in) and females to 72 mm (2.8 in) in snout–vent length. The upper eyelids have a few scattered, large tubercles. The canthus rostralis is moderately sharp and tympanum is distinct; supratympanic fold is moderately developed. Dorsal skin is rugose with scattered large tubercles. The coloration of the dorsum varies: various shades of brown, yellow-brown, reddish brown, or live-brown are all recorded. Some females show a whitish or pale yellow vertebral line or stripe. Most individuals have a black interorbital line. Some individuals have dark limb bars. The iris is gold or copper-colored.

== Habitat and conservation ==
Its natural habitats are steep, rocky streams, primarily in premontane wet forests, but also in lowland and lower montane wet forests, between 400 and 2,000 m (1,300 and 6,600 ft) above sea level. It also occurs secondary forests and shade coffee plantations. While a common species, it is threatened by habitat loss, and potentially, chytridiomycosis.
