= Craugastor silvicola =

Conservation status
- Data Deficient (IUCN 3.1)

Scientific classification
- Kingdom: Animalia
- Phylum: Chordata
- Class: Amphibia
- Order: Anura
- Family: Craugastoridae
- Genus: Craugastor
- Species: C. silvicola

Binomial name
- Craugastor silvicola (Lynch, 1967)

Synonyms
- Eleutherodactylus silvicola Lynch, 1967

Species of frog

Craugastor silvicola, also known as the forest robber frog, is a species of frog in the family Craugastoridae. It is endemic to Mexico and only known from its type locality near Zanatepec, Oaxaca, on the Isthmus of Tehuantepec.

== Description ==
Craugastor silvicola was described based an adult female, the holotype, measuring 40 mm (1.6 in) in snout–vent length. The head is as wide as the body and slightly broader than long; the snout is rounded. The canthus rostralis is sharp. The tympanum is visible and relatively large. The fingers are long and slender with greatly expanded fingertips. The toes lack webbing and fringes; the toe tips are enlarged. The coloration (in alcohol) is drab: dorsum and flanks are gray to cream with brown markings; the venter is immaculate.

== Habitat and conservation ==
Its natural habitat is pine-oak forest at elevations of 1,450–1,600 m (4,760–5,250 ft) above sea level; the type locality was characterized as cloud forest. It is a very rare frog that is threatened by habitat loss caused by logging and agricultural expansion.
