= Craugastor adamastus =

Conservation status
- Critically Endangered (IUCN 3.1)

Scientific classification
- Kingdom: Animalia
- Phylum: Chordata
- Class: Amphibia
- Order: Anura
- Family: Craugastoridae
- Genus: Craugastor
- Subgenus: Campbellius
- Species: C. adamastus

Binomial name
- Craugastor adamastus (Campbell, 1994)

Synonyms
- Eleutherodactylus adamastus Campbell, 1994

Species of frog

Craugastor adamastus is a species of frog in the family Craugastoridae. It is endemic to Guatemala and only known from its type locality near Aldea Vista Hermosa, on the northern slopes of the eastern portion of the Sierra de las Minas, where the type series was collected in 1980–1981.

== Etymology ==
The specific name adamastus honors Jay M. Savage, in recognition of "his many contributions to herpetology, especially in the area of the biology of Eleutherodactylus" (n.b.—this species was originally described as Eleutherodactylus adamastus). It is derived from the Greek adamastos that means "untamed, wild, or savage".

== Description ==
The type series consists of seven individuals Three adult males and two adult females were measured: the males measure 28–31 mm (1.1–1.2 in) and the females 39–41 mm (1.5–1.6 in) in snout–vent length. The snout is ovoid in dorsal view and truncate in profile. The canthus rostralis is well-defined. The tympanum is distinct in males and indistinct in females. The fingers and toes bear discs; the toes have moderate webbing while the fingers are unwebbed. The upper parts of the body, flanks, and upper surface of limbs are strongly granular. The largest tubercles are on the flanks. Dorsal coloration is more or less uniformly brown, but most specimens have a weak inter-orbital bar and a marking below the eye. The larger tubercles are mostly gray. The venter is yellowish to cream with numerous dark brown melanophores that make a vermiculate pattern on belly and thighs.

== Habitat and conservation ==
This species is known from an undisturbed forest, transitional between premontane moist and premontane wet forest, at about 600–650 m (1,970–2,130 ft) above sea level. Individuals were mostly seen perched on leaf litter or rocks along or near streams, but one individuals was under a rock near a stream.

Craugastor adamastus is threatened by habitat loss caused by agricultural activity and wood extraction, and by water pollution. The type locality, however, is in the Sierra de las Minas Biosphere Reserve. Chytridiomycosis is possibly behind the dramatic declines seen in many other stream-dwelling frogs, and could also affect this species.
