= Craugastor aphanus =

Conservation status
- Endangered (IUCN 3.1)

Scientific classification
- Kingdom: Animalia
- Phylum: Chordata
- Class: Amphibia
- Order: Anura
- Family: Craugastoridae
- Genus: Craugastor
- Species: C. aphanus

Binomial name
- Craugastor aphanus (Campbell, 1994)

Synonyms
- Eleutherodactylus aphanus Campbell, 1994

Species of frog

Craugastor aphanus is a species of frog in the family Craugastoridae. It is endemic to the Sierra del Mico and Sierra de las Minas ranges in the Izabal Department of eastern Guatemala.

== Description ==
Adult males measure 18–22 mm (0.71–0.87 in) and females 35–44 mm (1.4–1.7 in) in snout–vent length. In addition to the marked sexual dimorphism in size, males differ from females by having a relatively larger tympanum that is round as opposed elongated, and in coloration: the dorsum of adult females is medium or dark brown, whereas that of juveniles and males is usually paler and often with some yellow, orange, or reddish brown hue, occasionally dark olive brown. Even more strikingly, the venter is yellowish in males and purplish in females.

The skin of the dorsum is smooth but has prominent occipital folds that extend from the posterior edge of upper eyelids to above the scapulae. Neither fingers nor toes are webbed but they bear small discs.

== Habitat and conservation ==
Its natural habitat is low-altitude (591–786 m (1,939–2,579 ft) above sea level) cloud forest. Although much of its habitat is within a protected area, small-scale wood extraction is taking place and the species is known from only from two locations.
