= Craugastor matudai =

Conservation status
- Endangered (IUCN 3.1)

Scientific classification
- Kingdom: Animalia
- Phylum: Chordata
- Class: Amphibia
- Order: Anura
- Clade: Brachycephaloidea
- Family: Craugastoridae
- Genus: Craugastor
- Subgenus: Campbellius
- Species: C. matudai

Binomial name
- Craugastor matudai (Taylor, 1941)

Synonyms
- Eleutherodactylus matudai Taylor, 1941

Species of amphibian

Craugastor matudai (common names: Matuda's robber frog, Matuda's stream frog) is a species of frog in the family Craugastoridae.

== Taxonomy ==
The first description of the species was published in 1941 by Edward H. Taylor, who placed it in the genus Eleutherodactylus. It was implicitly moved to Craugastor by Andrew J. Crawford and Eric N. Smith in 2005. It is named after Japanese–Mexican botanist Eizi Matuda, who hosted Hobart Muir Smith and his wife Rozella B. Smith, the collectors of the type series from Cerro Ovando.

== Description ==
Males measure 27–28 mm (1.1–1.1 in) and females 37–40 mm (1.5–1.6 in) in snout–vent length. The body is heavily rugose with tiny pearly-topped tubercles. The canthus rostralis is sharp with slightly raised edges. The diameter of the tympanum relative to the eye is much larger in males (>^{4}/_{5}) than in females (little more than ^{1}/_{2}). Males lack vocal sac.

== Distribution and habitat ==
C. matudai is found in montane forests at elevations of 1,500–2,000 m (4,900–6,600 ft) above sea level on the Pacific versant of Mexico and Guatemala. The species is rare, only known to inhabit four separated locations: El Triunfo, Cerro Ovando and Cordon Pico el Loro-Paxtal, in the Sierra Madre de Chiapas of Mexico, and Aldea Fraternidad, in northern Guatemala. The locations have a combined area less than 926 km^{2} (358 sq mi). It is threatened by habitat loss, and possibly also by chytridiomycosis, and was classed as an endangered species by its 2019 assessment for the IUCN Red List. Mexican law protects it under the "Special Protection" category (Pr).
