= Craugastor campbelli =

Conservation status
- Critically Endangered (IUCN 3.1)

Scientific classification
- Kingdom: Animalia
- Phylum: Chordata
- Class: Amphibia
- Order: Anura
- Family: Craugastoridae
- Genus: Craugastor
- Species: C. campbelli

Binomial name
- Craugastor campbelli (E.N. Smith, 2005)

Synonyms
- Eleutherodactylus campbelli E.N. Smith, 2005; Craugastor campbelli — Crawford & E.N. Smith, 2005; Craugastor (Hylactophryne) campbelli — Hedges, Duellman & Heinicke, 2008

Species of amphibian

Craugastor campbelli is a species of frog in the family Craugastoridae. The species is endemic to Guatemala.

== Etymology ==
The specific name, campbelli, is in honor of American herpetologist Jonathan A. Campbell.

== Geographic range ==
C. campbelli is known from the Montañas del Mico in Izabal Department, Guatemala.

== Habitat ==
The natural habitat of C. campbelli is moist tropical forest, at altitudes of 260–962 m (853–3,156 ft).

== Behavior ==
C. campbelli is typically found at night, perched on leaves 0.25–2 m (0.82–6.56 ft) above the ground.

== Reproduction ==
C. campbelli reproduces by direct development.
