= Craugastor taylori =

Conservation status
- Critically Endangered (IUCN 3.1)

Scientific classification
- Kingdom: Animalia
- Phylum: Chordata
- Class: Amphibia
- Order: Anura
- Clade: Brachycephaloidea
- Family: Craugastoridae
- Genus: Craugastor
- Species: C. taylori

Binomial name
- Craugastor taylori (Lynch, 1966)

Synonyms
- Eleutherodactylus taylori Lynch, 1966

Species of amphibian

Craugastor taylori is a species of frog in the family Craugastoridae. It is endemic to Mexico and only known from its type locality near Rayón Mescalapa, Chiapas, in Southeast Mexico. Its common name is Taylor's robber frog. It is named in honour of Edward Harrison Taylor.

== Description ==
Craugastor taylori resembles Craugastor megalotympanum, which may be its closest relative. The holotype of Craugastor taylori, a male, measures 26 mm (1.0 in) in snout–vent length. Dorsum is smooth and pale cream in colour. Skin has some faint markings; limbs are banded. Tympanum is distinct and relatively large, ¾ of the eye diameter. Head is broader than long and snout is long.

== Habitat and conservation ==
Its natural habitat is presumably montane forest. The original description does not mention the specific habitat but refers to collections in cloud forests. It is a protected species in Mexico.
