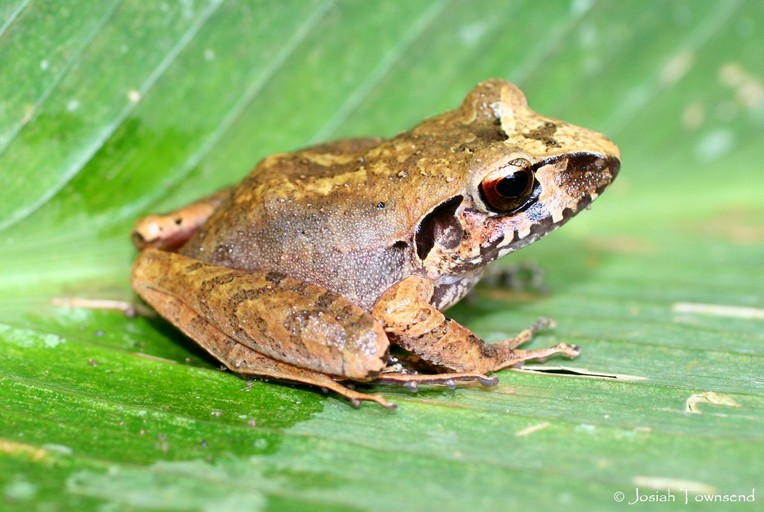

Conservation status
- Least Concern (IUCN 3.1)

Scientific classification
- Kingdom: Animalia
- Phylum: Chordata
- Class: Amphibia
- Order: Anura
- Family: Craugastoridae
- Genus: Craugastor
- Species: C. laticeps

Binomial name
- Craugastor laticeps (Duméril, 1853)

Synonyms
- Eleutherodactylus laticeps (Duméril, 1853); Eleutherodactylus stantoni Schmidt, 1941; Eleutherodactylus werleri Lynch and Fritts, 1965

= Craugastor laticeps =

Species of frog

Craugastor laticeps (common name: broad-headed rainfrog, and many variations) is a species of frog in the family Craugastoridae. It is found in Belize, Guatemala, Honduras, and southern Mexico.

Craugastor laticeps occurs in leaf-litter in lowland and premontane tropical forest. It tolerates moderate habitat alteration and can be found in cacao and coffee plantations. There are some threats to this species due to habitat loss.

== Reproduction ==
Craugastor laticeps might be unique among craugastorid frogs (which normally have direct development): one observation suggests that the species is ovoviviparous, ovipositing eggs with fully developed young almost ready to hatch. The female frog in question was 66 mm (2.6 in) in snout–vent length and laid 44 eggs, and the hatching or newly hatched froglets were about 13–14 mm (0.51–0.55 in) in snout–vent length.
