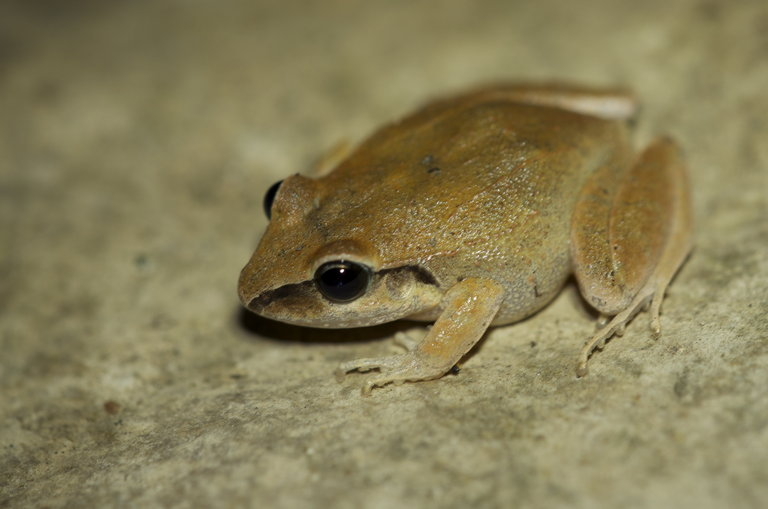

Conservation status
- Least Concern (IUCN 3.1)

Scientific classification
- Kingdom: Animalia
- Phylum: Chordata
- Class: Amphibia
- Order: Anura
- Family: Craugastoridae
- Genus: Craugastor
- Species: C. rhodopis

Binomial name
- Craugastor rhodopis (Cope, 1867)

Synonyms
- Lithodytes rhodopis Cope, 1867 "1866"; Eleutherodactylus rhodopis (Cope, 1867)

= Craugastor rhodopis =

Species of amphibian

Craugastor rhodopis, also known as the polymorphic robber frog, is a species of frog in the family Craugastoridae. It is endemic to Mexico and known from isolated high-elevation populations in western Veracruz and adjacent Hidalgo and Puebla states, and apparently disjunctly, from central and southeastern Chiapas and adjacent Oaxaca. Its natural habitat is tropical montane forest. It is threatened by habitat loss.
