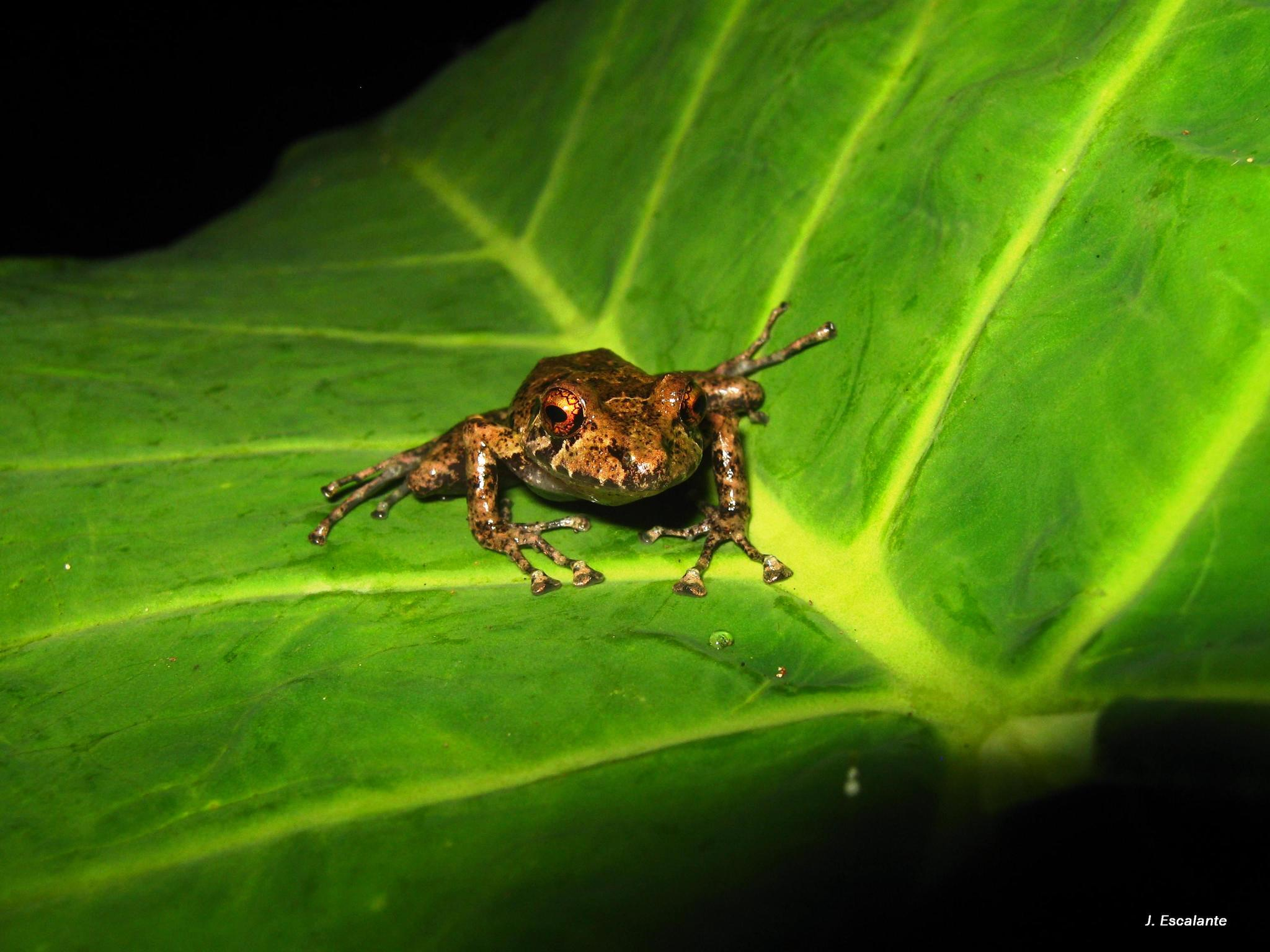

Conservation status
- Least Concern (IUCN 3.1)

Scientific classification
- Kingdom: Animalia
- Phylum: Chordata
- Class: Amphibia
- Order: Anura
- Family: Craugastoridae
- Genus: Craugastor
- Species: C. alfredi

Binomial name
- Craugastor alfredi (Boulenger, 1898)

= Craugastor alfredi =

Alfred's climbing frog

Species of frog

Craugastor alfredi is a species of frog in the family Craugastoridae. It is found in Guatemala and Mexico. Its natural habitat is subtropical or tropical moist lowland forest. It is threatened by habitat loss. Many populations are attracted to living in or near cave entrances, due to orthopterans and other food sources. They are categorized by having truncated digital pads on their two outer fingers and each fifth toe extends longer than the third. A subspecies of Craugastor alfredi was recently discovered in the Honduras called Craugastor cyanochthebius.
