= Craugastor milesi =

Conservation status
- Critically Endangered (IUCN 3.1)

Scientific classification
- Kingdom: Animalia
- Phylum: Chordata
- Class: Amphibia
- Order: Anura
- Clade: Brachycephaloidea
- Family: Craugastoridae
- Genus: Craugastor
- Species: C. milesi

Binomial name
- Craugastor milesi (K. Schmidt, 1933)

Species of frog

Craugastor milesi is a species of frog in the family Craugastoridae. It is endemic to Honduras. Its natural habitats are subtropical or tropical moist montane forests and rivers. It is threatened by habitat loss.
