= Craugastor uno =

Conservation status
- Vulnerable (IUCN 3.1)

Scientific classification
- Kingdom: Animalia
- Phylum: Chordata
- Class: Amphibia
- Order: Anura
- Family: Craugastoridae
- Genus: Craugastor
- Species: C. uno

Binomial name
- Craugastor uno (Savage, 1985)

Synonyms
- Eleutherodactylus uno Savage, 1985 "1984"

Species of amphibian

Craugastor uno is a species of frog in the family Craugastoridae. It is endemic to Mexico and known from the Sierra Madre del Sur in Guerrero and southern Oaxaca. Common names Savage's robber frog and strange robber frog have been coined for it. The specific name uno refers to uniqueness of this species among its relatives (at the time of description, genus Eleutherodactylus).

== Description ==
Craugastor uno was described based on a single specimen (holotype), an adult female measuring 63 mm (2.5 in) in snout–vent length. The appearance is robust; the head is broad and the limbs relatively short. The tympanum is elliptical. The fingers and toes have distinct discs; the toes have also slight webbing. The coloration is variable; specimens from have Guerrero have brown, grey, or orange ground color, while specimens from Oaxaca are generally tan or pink. Also the patterns vary, but all individuals had three paired black dorso-lateral blotches, a white mid-dorsal stripe, and a barred upper lip surface. Skin is covered by pustules that may small or large, giving skin an appearance that is smooth or rugose, respectively.

== Habitat and conservation ==
Craugastor uno inhabits mesic pine-oak forests at elevations of 1,550–2,295 m (5,085–7,530 ft) above sea level. It is threatened by habitat loss (deforestation) from logging, agriculture, and urban encroachment.
