= Craugastor stuarti =

Conservation status
- Vulnerable (IUCN 3.1)

Scientific classification
- Kingdom: Animalia
- Phylum: Chordata
- Class: Amphibia
- Order: Anura
- Family: Craugastoridae
- Genus: Craugastor
- Species: C. stuarti

Binomial name
- Craugastor stuarti (Lynch, 1967)

Synonyms
- Eleutherodactylus stuarti Lynch, 1967

Species of frog

Craugastor stuarti is a species of frog in the family Craugastoridae. It is found in the Pacific slopes of Guatemala and adjacent Chiapas, Mexico. Its natural habitats are tropical humid cloud forests at elevations of 1,300–2,200 m (4,300–7,200 ft) above sea level; it is a terrestrial species although it can also occur in small bushes. It is threatened by habitat loss mainly caused by agriculture and logging.
