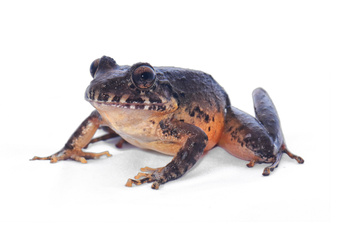

Conservation status
- Critically Endangered (IUCN 3.1)

Scientific classification
- Kingdom: Animalia
- Phylum: Chordata
- Class: Amphibia
- Order: Anura
- Family: Craugastoridae
- Genus: Craugastor
- Subgenus: Craugastor
- Species: C. escoces

Binomial name
- Craugastor escoces (Savage, 1975)

Synonyms
- Eleutherodactylus escoces Savage, 1975

= Craugastor escoces =

Species of frog

Craugastor escoces is a species of frog in the family Craugastoridae. It is endemic to Costa Rica. After not having been seen after 1986—despite extensive directed surveys—it was declared extinct by the International Union for Conservation of Nature (IUCN) in 2004. However, the species was rediscovered on September 18, 2016, when two researchers from the University of Costa Rica found a female Craugastor escoces at the edge of the Juan Castro Blanco National Park in Alajuela Province.

== Habitat ==
Its natural habitats are premontane and lower montane rainforests at elevations of 1,100–2,100 m (3,600–6,900 ft) above sea level.
