= Craugastor hobartsmithi =

Conservation status
- Least Concern (IUCN 3.1)

Scientific classification
- Kingdom: Animalia
- Phylum: Chordata
- Class: Amphibia
- Order: Anura
- Clade: Brachycephaloidea
- Family: Craugastoridae
- Genus: Craugastor
- Species: C. hobartsmithi

Binomial name
- Craugastor hobartsmithi (Taylor, 1936)

Species of frog

Craugastor hobartsmithi is a species of frog in the family Craugastoridae. It is endemic to Mexico. Its natural habitats are subtropical or tropical dry forests and subtropical or tropical moist montane forests. It is threatened by habitat loss.
