= Craugastor nefrens =

Conservation status
- Critically Endangered (IUCN 3.1)

Scientific classification
- Kingdom: Animalia
- Phylum: Chordata
- Class: Amphibia
- Order: Anura
- Family: Craugastoridae
- Genus: Craugastor
- Species: C. nefrens

Binomial name
- Craugastor nefrens (Smith, 2005)

Synonyms
- Eleutherodactylus nefrens Smith, 2005

Species of frog

Craugastor nefrens is a species of frog in the family Craugastoridae. It is endemic to Guatemala and known from the Sierra de Caral in the Izabal Department; it is expected to occur in adjacent Honduras too. Its natural habitat is moist tropical forest where they are found at night perched on leaves 0.3–2 metres above the ground.
