= Craugastor spatulatus =

Conservation status
- Endangered (IUCN 3.1)

Scientific classification
- Kingdom: Animalia
- Phylum: Chordata
- Class: Amphibia
- Order: Anura
- Family: Craugastoridae
- Genus: Craugastor
- Species: C. spatulatus

Binomial name
- Craugastor spatulatus (Smith, 1939)

Synonyms
- Eleutherodactylus spatulatus Smith, 1939; Eleutherodactylus bufonoides Lynch, 1965 "1964"

Species of frog

Craugastor spatulatus is a species of frog in the family Craugastoridae. It is endemic to Mexico and known from Cuautlapam in central Veracruz and Vista Hermosa in the Sierra Juárez, Oaxaca. Its natural habitat is cloud forest. This formerly abundant species has strongly declined because of habitat loss, although other factors may have been involved too.
