= Craugastor myllomyllon =

Conservation status
- Extinct (IUCN 3.1)

Scientific classification
- Kingdom: Animalia
- Phylum: Chordata
- Class: Amphibia
- Order: Anura
- Family: Craugastoridae
- Genus: Craugastor
- Subgenus: Campbellius
- Species: †C. myllomyllon

Binomial name
- †Craugastor myllomyllon (Savage, 2000)

Synonyms
- Eleutherodactylus myllomyllon Savage, 2000

Extinct species of amphibian

Craugastor myllomyllon is an extinct species of frog in the family Craugastoridae. It was endemic to Guatemala and only known from its type locality, Finca Volcan, in the Sierra de Xucaneb, Alta Verapaz Department. Only a single specimen is known.

== Etymology ==
The specific name myllomyllon honors Jonathan A. Campbell, an American herpetologist. It relates to the Scottish surname Campbell (meaning "wry lip") through the Greek words myllos ("bent") and myllon ("lip"). Jay M. Savage further notes that "those that know Jonathan well may see a connection between the name and his oral renditions of his Guatemalan adventures".

== Description ==
The holotype is an immature female measuring 30 mm (1.2 in) in snout–vent length. The snout is rounded in dorsal outline and obtuse (sloping) in lateral view. The tympanum is indistinct. The dorsum is covered with widely spaced moderate-sized tubercles. The fingers have slightly expanded discs and lateral keels; the toe discs that are slightly larger than those on the fingers. The toes have well-developed lateral fringes and moderate webbing. The preserved specimen is dorsally brown, with tips of tubercles and suprascapular and presacral ridges cream-colored. There is an indistinct interorbital bar that is demarcated posteriorly by a narrow dark brown bar. The limbs have weak, dark crossbars. The chin, throat, and venter are pale cream and have scattered melanophores.

== Habitat and conservation ==
The holotype was presumably collected from a premontane wet forest at 875 m (2,871 ft) above sea level; there is some uncertainty about its exact origins. Specific threats to this species are unknown, but habitat loss caused by agricultural encroachment is a general threat.
