= Craugastor amniscola =

Conservation status
- Vulnerable (IUCN 3.1)

Scientific classification
- Kingdom: Animalia
- Phylum: Chordata
- Class: Amphibia
- Order: Anura
- Family: Craugastoridae
- Genus: Craugastor
- Subgenus: Craugastor
- Species: C. amniscola

Binomial name
- Craugastor amniscola (Campbell and Savage, 2000)

Synonyms
- Eleutherodactylus amniscola Campbell and Savage, 2000

Species of amphibian

Craugastor amniscola is a species of frogs in the family Craugastoridae. It is found in western Guatemala and in Chiapas, Mexico. The specific name amniscola is derived from Latin amnis for rivulet and -cola for dweller and refers to the habitat of this species. Accordingly, common name rivulet rainfrog has been coined for it.

== Description ==
Adult males can reach at least 38 mm (1.5 in) and adult females at least 67 mm (2.6 in) in snout–vent length. The snout is subacuminate in dorsal view and round in lateral view. Males have a few scattered, large, flat or rounded tubercles in their upper eyelids. The tympanum is distinct. The finger and toe discs are weakly developed. The fingers have weak lateral keels while the toes have lateral flanges and moderate webbing. The upper parts are medium to olive brown, with heavy black mottling on the back. The limbs have moderately distinct crossbars. The flanks and the groin are whitish with irregular brown or black mottling. The venter is whitish or cream.

== Habitat and conservation ==
Craugastor amniscola inhabits premontane dry forests along small tributary streams at elevations of 600–1,000 m (2,000–3,300 ft) above sea level. Development is direct, i.e., there is no free-living larval stage.

This species is threatened by habitat loss and water pollution. Chytridiomycosis is a potential threat.
