= Craugastor vocalis =

Conservation status
- Least Concern (IUCN 3.1)

Scientific classification
- Kingdom: Animalia
- Phylum: Chordata
- Class: Amphibia
- Order: Anura
- Clade: Brachycephaloidea
- Family: Craugastoridae
- Genus: Craugastor
- Species: C. vocalis

Binomial name
- Craugastor vocalis (Taylor, 1940)

Species of frog

Craugastor vocalis is a species of frog in the family Craugastoridae. It is endemic to Mexico. Its natural habitats are subtropical or tropical dry forests and subtropical or tropical moist montane forests. It is threatened by habitat loss.
