= Craugastor mexicanus =

Conservation status
- Least Concern (IUCN 3.1)

Scientific classification
- Kingdom: Animalia
- Phylum: Chordata
- Class: Amphibia
- Order: Anura
- Family: Craugastoridae
- Genus: Craugastor
- Species: C. mexicanus

Binomial name
- Craugastor mexicanus (Brocchi, 1877)

Synonyms
- Leiuperus mexicanus Brocchi, 1877; Eleutherodactylus mexicanus (Brocchi, 1877); Microbatrachylus oaxacae Taylor, 1940 "1939"; Eleutherodactylus oaxacae (Taylor, 1940); Microbatrachylus lineatissimus Taylor, 1941; Eleutherodactylus lineatissimus (Taylor, 1941); Microbatrachylus fuscatus Davis and Dixon, 1957; Eleutherodactylus mexicanus fuscatus (Davis and Dixon, 1957)

Species of frog

Craugastor mexicanus is a species of frog in the family Craugastoridae. It is endemic to eastern Mexico and occurs in the states of Oaxaca, Puebla, Hidalgo, and Veracruz. It is a common species inhabiting tropical wet and semi-deciduous forest, pine-oak montane forest, and montane cloud forest at elevations of 700–3,420 m (2,300–11,220 ft) above sea level. Although it is adaptable to habitat disturbance, loss of cloud forest is a potential threat to it. Also chytridiomycosis can have negative impacts. It is present in a number of protected areas, including Cofre de Perote National Park, Tehuacán-Cuicatlán Biosphere Reserve, and Cuenca Hidrográfica Río Necaxa.
