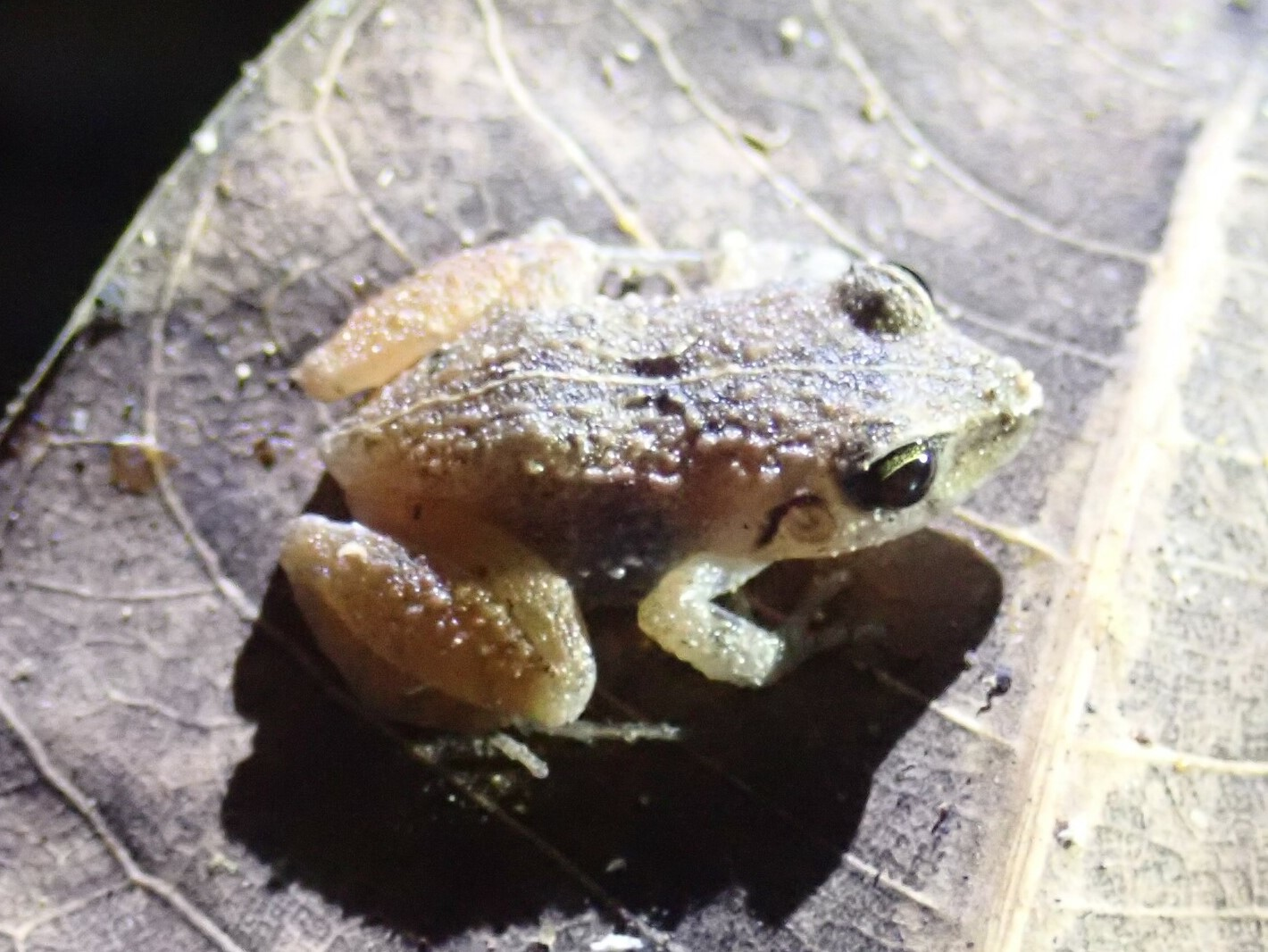

Conservation status
- Least Concern (IUCN 3.1)

Scientific classification
- Kingdom: Animalia
- Phylum: Chordata
- Class: Amphibia
- Order: Anura
- Family: Craugastoridae
- Genus: Craugastor
- Species: C. stejnegerianus

Binomial name
- Craugastor stejnegerianus (Cope, 1893)

Synonyms
- Microbatrachylus costaricensis Taylor, 1952

= Craugastor stejnegerianus =

Species of frog

Craugastor stejnegerianus is a species of frog in the family Craugastoridae. It is found in Costa Rica and Panama. Its natural habitats are subtropical or tropical dry forests, subtropical or tropical moist lowland forests, subtropical or tropical moist montane forests, pastureland, plantations, and heavily degraded former forest. It is threatened by habitat loss.
