= Craugastor underwoodi =

Conservation status
- Least Concern (IUCN 3.1)

Scientific classification
- Kingdom: Animalia
- Phylum: Chordata
- Class: Amphibia
- Order: Anura
- Family: Craugastoridae
- Genus: Craugastor
- Species: C. underwoodi

Binomial name
- Craugastor underwoodi (Boulenger, 1896)

Species of frog

Craugastor underwoodi is a species of frog in the family Craugastoridae. It is found in Costa Rica and Panama. Its natural habitats are subtropical or tropical moist lowland forests, subtropical or tropical moist montane forests, pastureland, plantations, and heavily degraded former forest.
