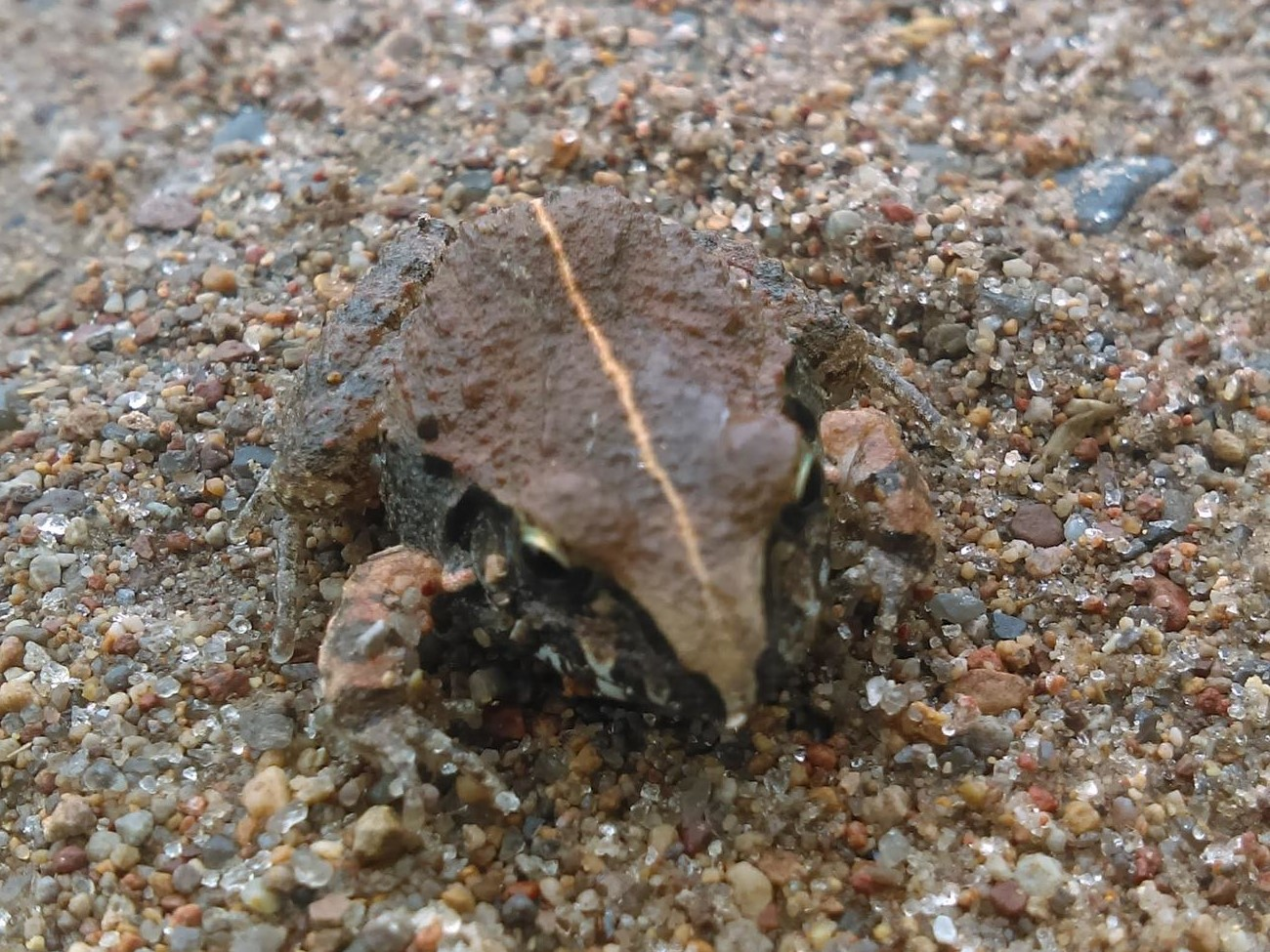

Conservation status
- Least Concern (IUCN 3.1)

Scientific classification
- Kingdom: Animalia
- Phylum: Chordata
- Class: Amphibia
- Order: Anura
- Clade: Brachycephaloidea
- Family: Craugastoridae
- Genus: Craugastor
- Species: C. occidentalis

Binomial name
- Craugastor occidentalis (Taylor, 1941)

= Craugastor occidentalis =

Species of frog

Craugastor occidentalis is a species of frog in the family Craugastoridae. It is endemic to Mexico. Its natural habitat is subtropical or tropical dry forests.
