= Craugastor daryi =

Conservation status
- Endangered (IUCN 3.1)

Scientific classification
- Kingdom: Animalia
- Phylum: Chordata
- Class: Amphibia
- Order: Anura
- Clade: Brachycephaloidea
- Family: Craugastoridae
- Genus: Craugastor
- Species: C. daryi

Binomial name
- Craugastor daryi (Ford & Savage, 1984)

Species of frog

Craugastor daryi is a species of frog in the family Craugastoridae. It is endemic to Guatemala. Its natural habitats are subtropical or tropical moist montane forests, rivers, and intermittent rivers. It is threatened by habitat loss.
