= Craugastor palenque =

Conservation status
- Vulnerable (IUCN 3.1)

Scientific classification
- Kingdom: Animalia
- Phylum: Chordata
- Class: Amphibia
- Order: Anura
- Clade: Brachycephaloidea
- Family: Craugastoridae
- Genus: Craugastor
- Species: C. palenque

Binomial name
- Craugastor palenque (Campbell & Savage, 2000)

Species of amphibian

Craugastor palenque is a species of frogs in the family Craugastoridae.

It is found in Guatemala and Mexico. Its natural habitats are subtropical or tropical moist lowland forests and rivers. It is threatened by habitat loss.
