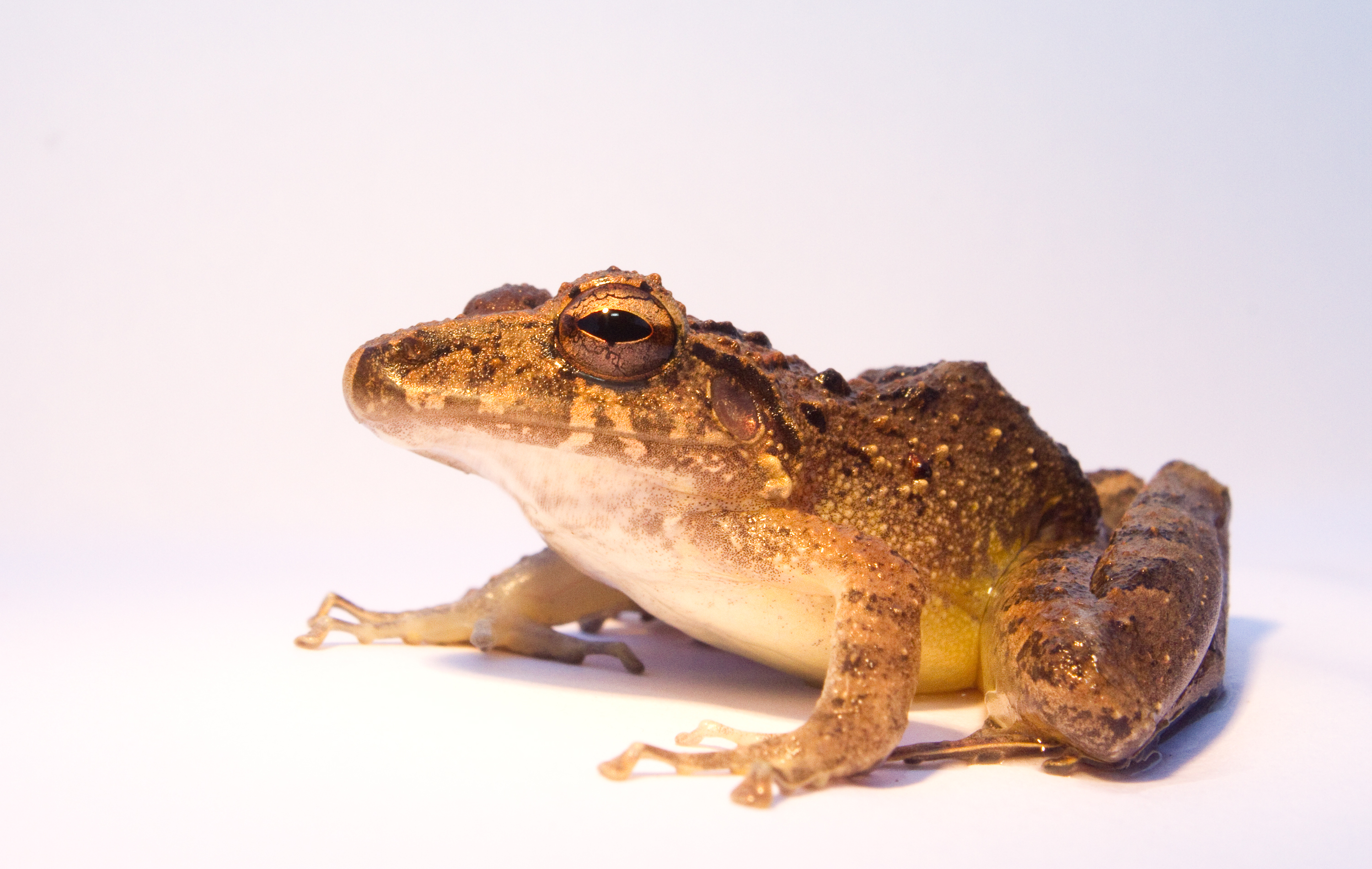
- specimen in Gamboa, Panama

Conservation status
- Least Concern (IUCN 3.1)

Scientific classification
- Kingdom: Animalia
- Phylum: Chordata
- Class: Amphibia
- Order: Anura
- Clade: Brachycephaloidea
- Family: Craugastoridae
- Genus: Craugastor
- Species: C. crassidigitus

Binomial name
- Craugastor crassidigitus (Taylor, 1952)

= Craugastor crassidigitus =

Species of frog

Craugastor crassidigitus is a species of frog in the family Craugastoridae. It is found in Colombia, Costa Rica, Panama, and possibly Nicaragua. Its natural habitats are subtropical or tropical moist lowland forests, subtropical or tropical moist montane forests, arable land, pastureland, plantations, and heavily degraded former forest.
