= Craugastor angelicus =

Angel robber frog

Conservation status
- Critically Endangered (IUCN 3.1)

Scientific classification
- Kingdom: Animalia
- Phylum: Chordata
- Class: Amphibia
- Order: Anura
- Clade: Brachycephaloidea
- Family: Craugastoridae
- Genus: Craugastor
- Species: C. angelicus

Binomial name
- Craugastor angelicus (Savage, 1975)

Species of frog

Craugastor angelicus, commonly known as the angel robber frog, is a species of frog in the family Craugastoridae. It is endemic to Costa Rica. Its natural habitats are subtropical or tropical moist montane forests and rivers.
