= Craugastor montanus =

Conservation status
- Endangered (IUCN 3.1)

Scientific classification
- Kingdom: Animalia
- Phylum: Chordata
- Class: Amphibia
- Order: Anura
- Clade: Brachycephaloidea
- Family: Craugastoridae
- Genus: Craugastor
- Species: C. montanus

Binomial name
- Craugastor montanus (Lynch, 1965)

Synonyms
- Microbatrachylus montanus Taylor, 1942; Eleutherodactylus sartori Lynch, 1965 — replacement name Craugastor sartori (Lynch, 1965)

Species of frog

Craugastor sartori, also known as the Chiapas dwarf robber frog, is a species of frog in the family Craugastoridae. It is endemic to Mexico and known from the Sierra Madre de Chiapas in the vicinity of Cerro Ovando, at elevations of about 1,200–1,900 m (3,900–6,200 ft) asl. Its natural habitats are montane cloud and mixed forests. It is threatened by habitat loss caused by particularly logging.
