= Craugastor cuaquero =

Conservation status
- Data Deficient (IUCN 3.1)

Scientific classification
- Kingdom: Animalia
- Phylum: Chordata
- Class: Amphibia
- Order: Anura
- Clade: Brachycephaloidea
- Family: Craugastoridae
- Genus: Craugastor
- Species: C. cuaquero

Binomial name
- Craugastor cuaquero (Savage, 1980)

Species of frog

Craugastor cuaquero is a species of frog in the family Craugastoridae. It is endemic to Costa Rica. Its natural habitat is subtropical or tropical moist montane forests.
