= Craugastor obesus =

Conservation status
- Critically Endangered (IUCN 3.1)

Scientific classification
- Kingdom: Animalia
- Phylum: Chordata
- Class: Amphibia
- Order: Anura
- Clade: Brachycephaloidea
- Family: Craugastoridae
- Genus: Craugastor
- Species: C. obesus

Binomial name
- Craugastor obesus (Barbour, 1928)

Synonyms
- Eleutherodactylus obesus (Barbour, 1928); Syrrhopus obesus Barbour, 1928

Species of frog

Craugastor obesus is a species of frog in the family Craugastoridae. It is found in the Caribbean slopes of southeastern Costa Rica and western Panama. Its natural habitats are lowland moist forest, premontane and lower montane wet forest and rainforest. It can be found in the spray zone on rocks, boulders, and cliff faces in the middle of moderate-sized cascading streams.

Craugastor obesus is a rare frog. In Costa Rica it was last time recorded in 1984. Recent sampling efforts within its range in Panama have not produced any new observations either, although not enough has been done to indicate uplifting to possibly extinct. The main threat to this species is chytridiomycosis.
