= Craugastor pelorus =

Conservation status
- Vulnerable (IUCN 3.1)

Scientific classification
- Kingdom: Animalia
- Phylum: Chordata
- Class: Amphibia
- Order: Anura
- Clade: Brachycephaloidea
- Family: Craugastoridae
- Genus: Craugastor
- Species: C. pelorus

Binomial name
- Craugastor pelorus Campbell & Savage, 2000

Species of frog

Craugastor pelorus is a species of frog in the family Craugastoridae.

It is endemic to Mexico. Its natural habitats are subtropical or tropical moist lowland forests, subtropical or tropical moist montane forests, and intermittent rivers. It is threatened by habitat loss.
