= Craugastor catalinae =

Conservation status
- Critically Endangered (IUCN 3.1)

Scientific classification
- Kingdom: Animalia
- Phylum: Chordata
- Class: Amphibia
- Order: Anura
- Family: Craugastoridae
- Genus: Craugastor
- Subgenus: Craugastor
- Species: C. catalinae

Binomial name
- Craugastor catalinae (Campbell and Savage, 2000)

Synonyms
- Eleutherodactylus catalinae Campbell and Savage, 2000

Species of amphibian

Craugastor catalinae is a species of frogs in the family Craugastoridae. It is found in the Río Cotón drainage in the Pacific southwestern Costa Rica and on the Pacific slopes of Volcán Barú, western Panama. The specific name catalinae, rather obliquely, honors Karen R. Lips: Spanish name "Catalina" corresponds to Danish name "Karen". Lips collected a part of the type series and has "contributed substantially to our knowledge of the Río Cotón drainage herpetofauna and the declining amphibian populations problem in lower Central America."

== Description ==
Adult males measure 30–45 mm (1.2–1.8 in) and adult females 45–75 mm (1.8–3.0 in) in snout–vent length. The snout is subovoid to subelliptical from above and rounded in profile. The tympanum is distinct; it is round in males but ovoid in females. The fingers have discs and weak lateral keels. The toes have discs, fleshy fringes or broad flanges, and are moderately to heavily webbed. The dorsum is dark brown, olive, greenish gray, or gray-brown, and has a few darker spots. There is often a faint, light mid-dorsal pin stripe. The posterior thigh surface is dark brown and has yellow mottling. The venter is pale cream, with weak light brown punctations on the throat and chest.

== Habitat and conservation ==
Natural habitats of Craugastor catalinae are streams in premontane and lower montane humid forests at elevations of 1,219–1,800 m (3,999–5,906 ft) above sea level. This species was once common in Costa Rica, but has now disappeared from much of its range; it has also declined in Panama. In addition to habitat loss, the decline is assumed to be caused by chytridiomycosis. It is known from some protected areas, including the La Amistad International Park.
