= Craugastor merendonensis =

Conservation status
- Critically Endangered (IUCN 3.1)

Scientific classification
- Kingdom: Animalia
- Phylum: Chordata
- Class: Amphibia
- Order: Anura
- Clade: Brachycephaloidea
- Family: Craugastoridae
- Genus: Craugastor
- Species: C. merendonensis

Binomial name
- Craugastor merendonensis (K. Schmidt, 1933)

Species of amphibian

Craugastor merendonensis is a species of frog in the family Craugastoridae.

It is endemic to Honduras. Its natural habitats are subtropical or tropical moist lowland forests and rivers.
