= Craugastor glaucus =

Conservation status
- Endangered (IUCN 3.1)

Scientific classification
- Kingdom: Animalia
- Phylum: Chordata
- Class: Amphibia
- Order: Anura
- Clade: Brachycephaloidea
- Family: Craugastoridae
- Genus: Craugastor
- Species: C. glaucus

Binomial name
- Craugastor glaucus (Lynch, 1967)

Species of frog

Craugastor glaucus is a species of frog in the family Craugastoridae. It is endemic to the Chiapas Highlands of southern Mexico. Its natural habitat is subtropical or tropical moist montane forest. It is threatened by habitat loss.
