= Craugastor batrachylus =

Conservation status
- Data Deficient (IUCN 3.1)

Scientific classification
- Kingdom: Animalia
- Phylum: Chordata
- Class: Amphibia
- Order: Anura
- Clade: Brachycephaloidea
- Family: Craugastoridae
- Genus: Craugastor
- Species: C. batrachylus

Binomial name
- Craugastor batrachylus Taylor, 1940

Synonyms
- Eleutherodactylus batrachylus Taylor, 1940

Species of frog

Craugastor batrachylus is a species of frog in the family Craugastoridae. It is endemic to Mexico. Its natural habitats are subtropical or tropical moist montane forests and subtropical or tropical moist shrubland.
