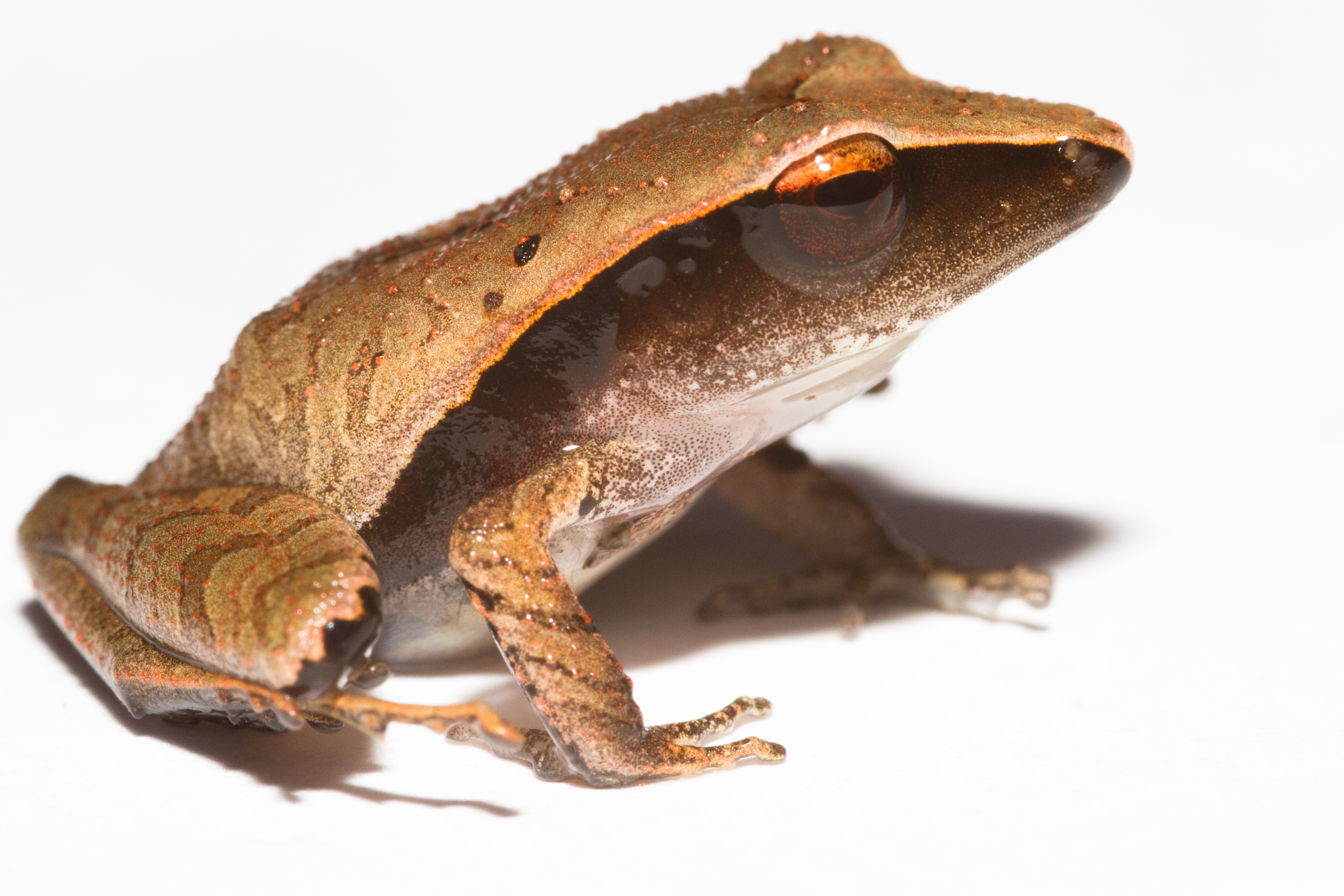

Conservation status
- Least Concern (IUCN 3.1)

Scientific classification
- Kingdom: Animalia
- Phylum: Chordata
- Class: Amphibia
- Order: Anura
- Family: Craugastoridae
- Genus: Craugastor
- Species: C. gollmeri

Binomial name
- Craugastor gollmeri (Peters, 1863)

Synonyms
- Eleutherodactylus goldmani Noble, 1924; Eleutherodactylus humeralis Fowler, 1916; Lithodytes lanciformis Cope, 1877

= Craugastor gollmeri =

Species of frog

Craugastor gollmeri is a species of frog in the family Craugastoridae. It is found in Costa Rica and Panama. Its natural habitats are subtropical or tropical moist lowland forests, subtropical or tropical moist montane forests, rural gardens, and heavily degraded former forest. It is threatened by habitat loss.

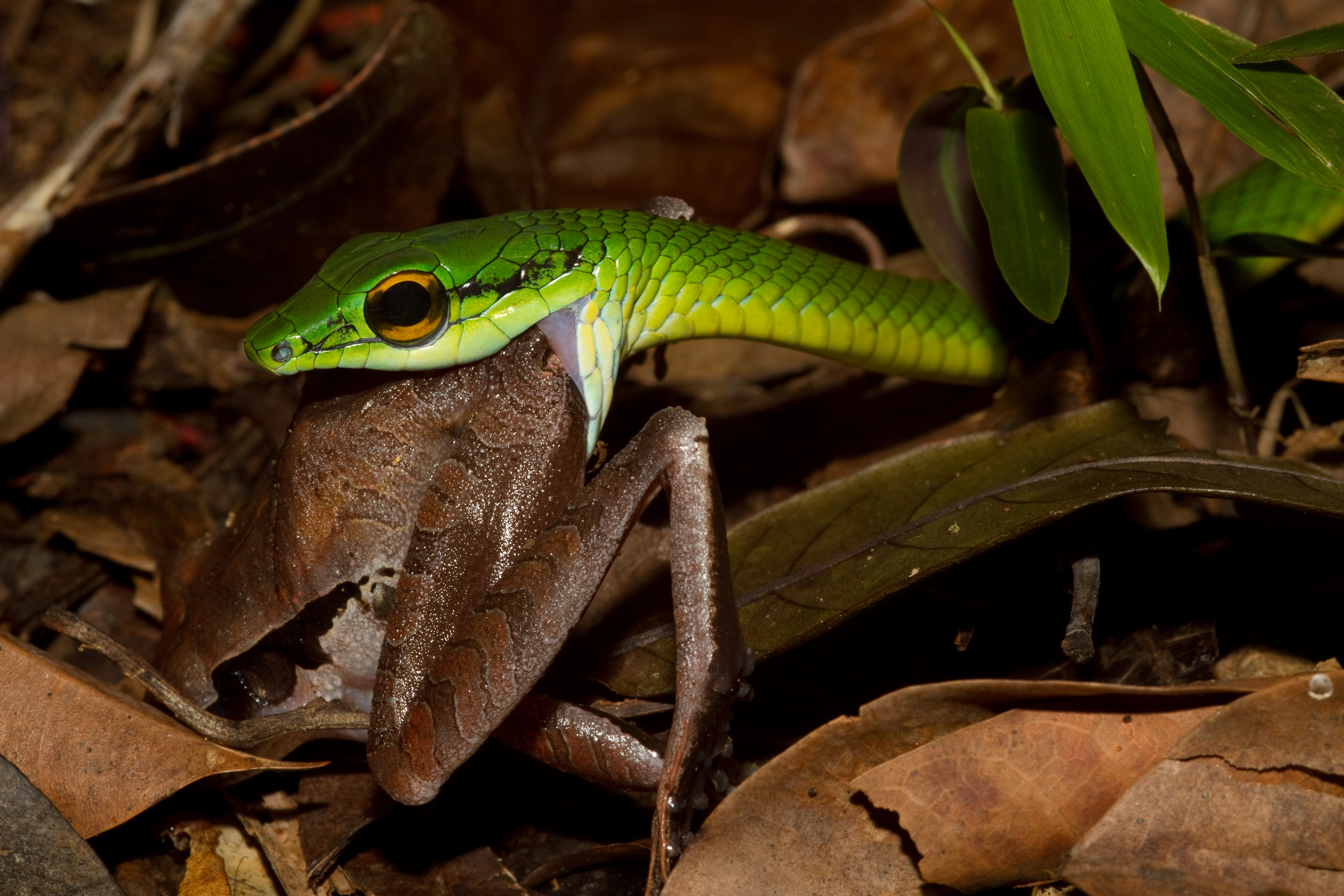
Leptophis ahaetulla eating Craugastor gollmeri
