= Craugastor coffeus =

Conservation status
- Critically Endangered (IUCN 3.1)

Scientific classification
- Kingdom: Animalia
- Phylum: Chordata
- Class: Amphibia
- Order: Anura
- Family: Craugastoridae
- Genus: Craugastor
- Species: C. coffeus

Binomial name
- Craugastor coffeus (McCranie & Köhler, 1999)

Species of frog

Craugastor coffeus is a species of frog in the family Craugastoridae. It is found in Honduras and possibly Guatemala. Its natural habitats are subtropical or tropical moist montane forests and plantations . It is threatened by habitat loss.
