= Craugastor rayo =

Conservation status
- Endangered (IUCN 3.1)

Scientific classification
- Kingdom: Animalia
- Phylum: Chordata
- Class: Amphibia
- Order: Anura
- Family: Craugastoridae
- Genus: Craugastor
- Species: C. rayo

Binomial name
- Craugastor rayo (Savage and DeWeese, 1979)

Synonyms
- Eleutherodactylus rayo Savage and DeWeese, 1979

Species of frog

Craugastor rayo, also known as the Sabana robber frog, is a species of frog in the family Craugastoridae. It is endemic to the Cordillera de Talamanca, Costa Rica.

== Etymology ==
The specific name rayo is an "arbitrary combination of letters that happens to mean lightning in Spanish". However, it also is an allusion to Roy Wallace McDiarmid, collector of the holotype, recognizing his contributions to studying the Costa Rican herpetofauna.

== Description ==
Adult males measure 37–45 mm (1.5–1.8 in) and females 38–71 mm (1.5–2.8 in) in snout–vent length. The fingers have well-developed lateral fringes whereas the toes are basally webbed. The base color is deep bluish purple in males and slightly lighter and tending toward tan in females. Dorsal patterning is variable and may involve blotches or a mid-dorsal stripe, while some individuals are uniform in color. Limbs may be uniform or have dark, broad crossbars.

== Habitat and conservation ==
Its natural habitats are stream margins in upper premontane wet forests and rainforests and in lower montane rainforests at elevations of 1,480–1,820 m (4,860–5,970 ft) or 1,600–1,850 m (5,250–6,070 ft) above sea level. It is threatened by habitat loss, and possibly, chytridiomycosis.
