= Craugastor bocourti =

Conservation status
- Endangered (IUCN 3.1)

Scientific classification
- Kingdom: Animalia
- Phylum: Chordata
- Class: Amphibia
- Order: Anura
- Family: Craugastoridae
- Genus: Craugastor
- Species: C. bocourti

Binomial name
- Craugastor bocourti (Brocchi, 1877)

Synonyms
- Hylodes bocourti Brocchi, 1877; Eleutherodactylus bocourti (Brocchi, 1877)

Species of amphibian

Craugastor bocourti (common name: Bocourt's robber frog) is a species of frog in the family Craugastoridae. The species is endemic to Guatemala and found on the mountains of the Sierra de las Minas in Alta Verapaz Department. It is named after Marie Firmin Bocourt, a French zoologist and artist.

== Habitat ==
The natural habitat of Craugaster bocourti is cloud forest, where it lives on the forest floor. It occurs at elevations of 1,300–1,700 m (4,300–5,600 ft) above sea level.

== Conservation status ==
Craugastor bocourti is threatened by habitat loss caused by agriculture, wood extraction, and human settlement.
