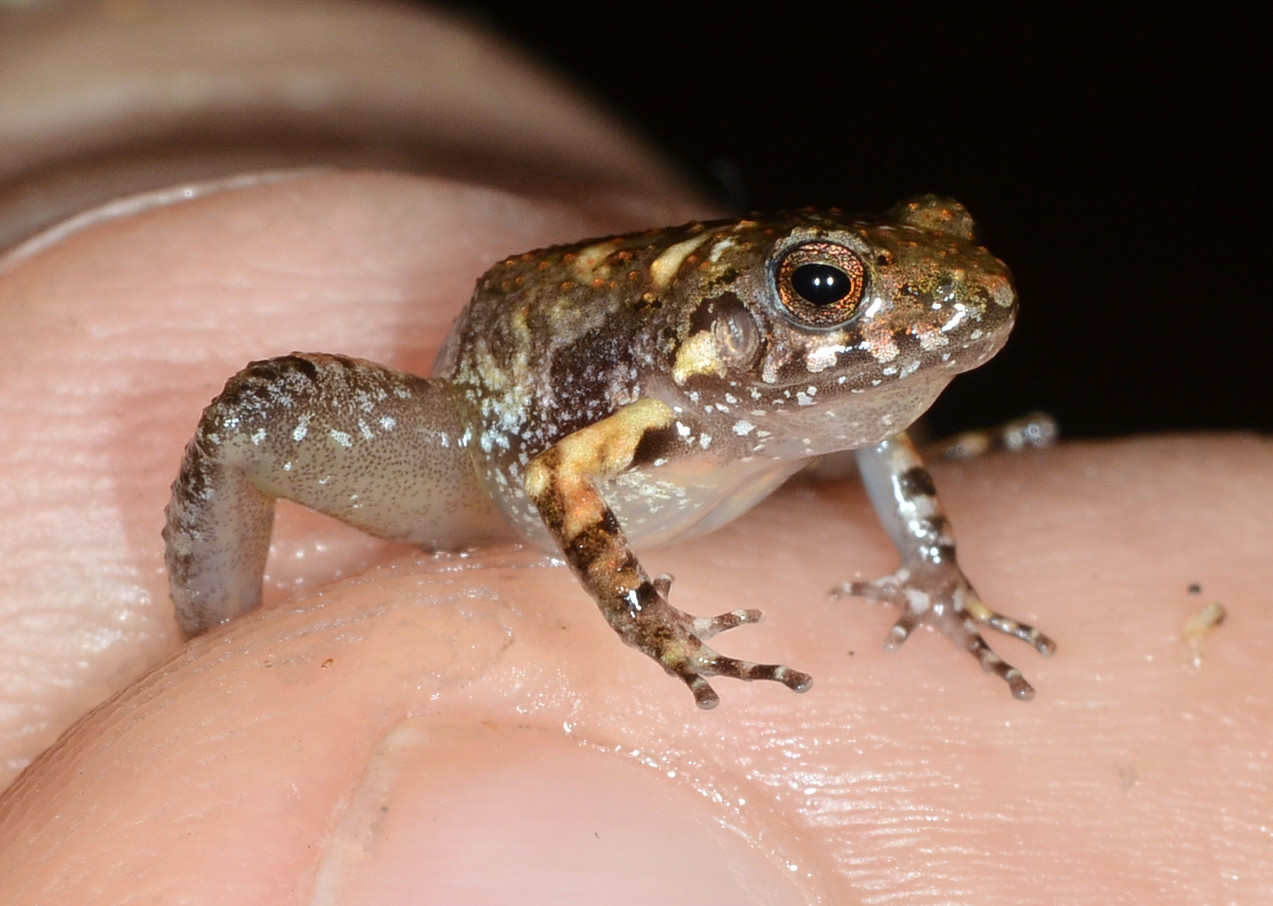

Conservation status
- Least Concern (IUCN 3.1)

Scientific classification
- Kingdom: Animalia
- Phylum: Chordata
- Class: Amphibia
- Order: Anura
- Family: Craugastoridae
- Genus: Craugastor
- Species: C. pygmaeus

Binomial name
- Craugastor pygmaeus (Taylor, 1937)

Synonyms
- Eleutherodactylus pygmaeus Taylor, 1937 "1936"; Microbatrachylus albolabris Taylor, 1940 "1939"; Microbatrachylus pygmaeus (Taylor, 1937); Microbatrachylus minimus Taylor, 1940 "1939"; Microbatrachylus imitator Taylor, 1942

= Craugastor pygmaeus =

Species of frog

Craugastor pygmaeus, also known as the pigmy free-fingered frog or the pigmy robber frog, is a species of frog in the family Craugastoridae. It is found in western Guatemala and southern Mexico from southern Sinaloa to Chiapas.

Craugastor pygmaeus shows strong color polymorphism. Several species have been described and later synonymized with this species, but it is in need of taxonomic revision and probably represents a complex of at least five species.

== Habitat and conservation ==
Craugastor pygmaeus occurs in a great variety of habitats, from lowland forests to montane pine and pine-oak forests and cloud forests at elevations of 400–2,000 m (1,300–6,600 ft) above sea level. It can tolerate some habitat modification as long as shade remains, such as coffee plantations. Development is direct (i.e., there is no free-living larval stage).

Craugastor pygmaeus can be locally common. It can be threatened by habitat and climate change (changing precipitation patterns) leading to the disappearance of shade, humidity and leaf-litter microhabitats. Chytridiomycosis is a potential threat. It occurs in some protected areas.
