= Craugastor decoratus =

Conservation status
- Least Concern (IUCN 3.1)

Scientific classification
- Kingdom: Animalia
- Phylum: Chordata
- Class: Amphibia
- Order: Anura
- Clade: Brachycephaloidea
- Family: Craugastoridae
- Genus: Craugastor
- Species: C. decoratus

Binomial name
- Craugastor decoratus (Taylor, 1942)

Synonyms
- Eleutherodactylus hidalgoensis Taylor, 1942

Species of frog

Craugastor decoratus is a species of frog in the family Craugastoridae. It is endemic to Mexico. Its natural habitats are subtropical or tropical moist montane forests, pastureland, and rural gardens. It is threatened by habitat loss.
