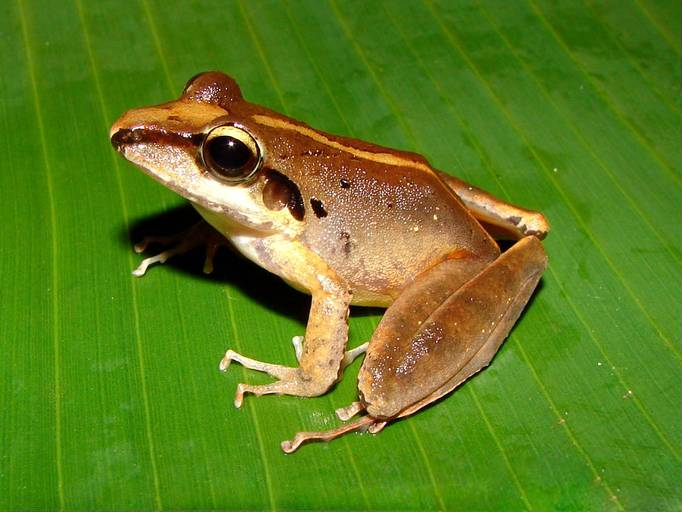
- Craugastor longirostris

Scientific classification
- Kingdom: Animalia
- Phylum: Chordata
- Class: Amphibia
- Order: Anura
- Clade: Brachycephaloidea
- Family: Craugastoridae
- Subfamily: Craugastorinae
- Genus: Craugastor; Cope, 1862

Type species
- Hylodes fitzingeri Schmidt, 1857

Diversity
- See text)

Synonyms
- Microbatrachylus Taylor, 1940 "1939"; Hylactophryne Lynch, 1968; Campbellius Hedges, Duellman & Heinicke, 2008

= Craugastor =

Genus of amphibians

Craugastor is a large genus of frogs in the family Craugastoridae with 126 species. Its scientific names means brittle-belly, from the Ancient Greek krauros (κραῦρος, brittle, dry) and gastēr (γαστήρ, belly, stomach).

== Species ==
The following species are recognised in the genus Craugastor:

- Craugastor adamastus (Campbell, 1994)
- Craugastor aenigmaticus Arias, Chaves, and Parra-Olea, 2018
- Craugastor alfredi (Boulenger, 1898)
- Craugastor amniscola (Campbell and Savage, 2000)
- †Craugastor anciano (Savage, McCranie, and Wilson, 1988)
- Craugastor andi (Savage, 1974)
- Craugastor angelicus (Savage, 1975)
- Craugastor aphanus (Campbell, 1994)
- Craugastor augusti (Dugès, 1879)
- Craugastor aurilegulus (Savage, McCranie, and Wilson, 1988)
- Craugastor azueroensis (Savage, 1975)
- Craugastor batrachylus (Taylor, 1940)
- Craugastor berkenbuschii (Peters, 1870)
- Craugastor bitonium Jameson, Streicher, Manuelli, Head, and Smith, 2022
- Craugastor blairi (Peters, 1870)
- Craugastor bocourti (Barbour, 1928)
- Craugastor bransfordii (Cope, 1886)
- Craugastor brocchi (Boulenger, 1882)
- Craugastor campbelli (Smith, 2005)
- Craugastor candelariensis Jameson, Streicher, Manuelli, Head, and Smith, 2022
- Craugastor castanedai McCranie, 2018
- Craugastor catalinae (Campbell and Savage, 2000)
- Craugastor chac (Savage, 1987)
- Craugastor charadra (Campbell and Savage, 2000)
- Craugastor chingopetaca Köhler and Sunyer, 2006
- Craugastor chrysozetetes (McCranie, Savage, and Wilson, 1989)
- Craugastor coffeus (McCranie and Köhler, 1999)
- Craugastor crassidigitus (Taylor, 1952)
- Craugastor cruzi (McCranie, Savage, and Wilson, 1989)
- Craugastor cuaquero (Savage, 1980)
- Craugastor cueyatl Jameson, Streicher, Manuelli, Head, and Smith, 2022
- Craugastor cyanochthebius McCranie and Smith, 2006
- Craugastor daryi (Ford and Savage, 1984)
- Craugastor decoratus (Taylor, 1942)
- Craugastor emcelae (Lynch, 1985)
- Craugastor emleni (Dunn and Emlen, 1932)
- Craugastor epochthidius (McCranie and Wilson, 1997)
- Craugastor escoces (Savage, 1975)
- Craugastor evanesco Ryan, Savage, Lips, and Giermakowski, 2010
- Craugastor fecundus (McCranie and Wilson, 1997)
- Craugastor fitzingeri (Schmidt, 1857)
- Craugastor fleischmanni (Boettger, 1892)
- Craugastor gabbi Arias, Chaves, Crawford, and Parra-Olea, 2016
- Craugastor galacticorhinus (Canseco-Márquez and Smith, 2004)
- Craugastor glaucus (Lynch, 1967)
- Craugastor gollmeri (Peters, 1863)
- Craugastor greggi (Bumzahem, 1955)
- Craugastor guerreroensis (Lynch, 1967)
- Craugastor gulosus (Cope, 1875)
- Craugastor gutschei McCranie, 2018
- Craugastor hobartsmithi (Taylor, 1937)
- Craugastor inachus (Campbell and Savage, 2000)
- Craugastor laevissimus (Werner, 1896)
- Craugastor laticeps (Duméril, 1853)
- Craugastor lauraster (Savage, McCranie, and Espinal, 1996)
- Craugastor lineatus (Brocchi, 1879)
- Craugastor loki (Shannon and Werler, 1955)
- Craugastor longirostris (Boulenger, 1898)
- Craugastor matudai (Taylor, 1941)
- Craugastor megacephalus (Cope, 1875)
- Craugastor megalotympanum (Shannon and Werler, 1955)
- Craugastor melanostictus (Cope, 1875)
- Craugastor merendonensis (Schmidt, 1933)
- Craugastor metriosistus Ospina-Sarria, Angarita-Sierra, and Pedroza-Banda, 2015
- Craugastor mexicanus (Brocchi, 1877)
- Craugastor milesi (Schmidt, 1933)
- Craugastor mimus (Taylor, 1955)
- Craugastor monnichorum (Dunn, 1940)
- Craugastor montanus (Taylor, 1942)
- †Craugastor myllomyllon (Savage, 2000)
- Craugastor nefrens (Smith, 2005)
- Craugastor noblei (Barbour and Dunn, 1921)
- Craugastor obesus (Barbour, 1928)
- Craugastor occidentalis (Taylor, 1941)
- Craugastor olanchano (McCranie and Wilson, 1999)
- Craugastor omiltemanus (Günther, 1900)
- †Craugastor omoaensis (McCranie and Wilson, 1997)
- Craugastor opimus (Savage and Myers, 2002)
- Craugastor palenque (Campbell and Savage, 2000)
- Craugastor pechorum (McCranie and Wilson, 1999)
- Craugastor pelorus (Campbell and Savage, 2000)
- Craugastor persimilis (Barbour, 1926)
- Craugastor phasma (Lips and Savage, 1996)
- Craugastor podiciferus (Cope, 1875)
- Craugastor polaclavus Jameson, Streicher, Manuelli, Head, and Smith, 2022
- Craugastor polymniae (Campbell, Lamar, and Hillis, 1989)
- Craugastor polyptychus (Cope, 1886)
- Craugastor portilloensis Jameson, Streicher, Manuelli, Head, and Smith, 2022
- Craugastor pozo (Johnson and Savage, 1995)
- Craugastor psephosypharus (Campbell, Savage, and Meyer, 1994)
- Craugastor punctariolus (Peters, 1863)
- Craugastor pygmaeus (Taylor, 1937)
- Craugastor raniformis (Boulenger, 1896)
- Craugastor ranoides (Cope, 1886)
- Craugastor rayo (Savage and DeWeese, 1979)
- Craugastor rhodopis (Cope, 1867)
- Craugastor rhyacobatrachus (Campbell and Savage, 2000)
- Craugastor rivulus (Campbell and Savage, 2000)
- Craugastor rostralis (Werner, 1896)
- Craugastor rubinus Jameson, Streicher, Manuelli, Head, and Smith, 2022
- Craugastor rugosus (Peters, 1873)
- Craugastor rugulosus (Cope, 1870)
- Craugastor rupinius (Campbell and Savage, 2000)
- Craugastor sabrinus (Campbell and Savage, 2000)
- Craugastor sagui Arias, Hertz, and Parra-Olea, 2019
- Craugastor saltator (Taylor, 1941)
- Craugastor saltuarius (McCranie and Wilson, 1997)
- Craugastor sandersoni (Schmidt, 1941)
- Craugastor silvicola (Lynch, 1967)
- Craugastor spatulatus (Smith, 1939)
- Craugastor stadelmani (Schmidt, 1936)
- Craugastor stejnegerianus (Cope, 1893)
- Craugastor stuarti (Lynch, 1967)
- Craugastor tabasarae (Savage, Hollingsworth, Lips, and Jaslow, 2004)
- Craugastor talamancae (Dunn, 1931)
- Craugastor tarahumaraensis (Taylor, 1940)
- Craugastor taurus (Taylor, 1958)
- Craugastor taylori (Lynch, 1966)
- Craugastor trachydermus (Campbell, 1994)
- Craugastor underwoodi (Boulenger, 1896)
- Craugastor uno (Savage, 1985)
- Craugastor vocalis (Taylor, 1940)
- Craugastor vulcani (Shannon and Werler, 1955)
- Craugastor xucanebi (Stuart, 1941)
- Craugastor yucatanensis (Lynch, 1965)
- Craugastor zunigai Arias, Hertz, and Parra-Olea, 2019
