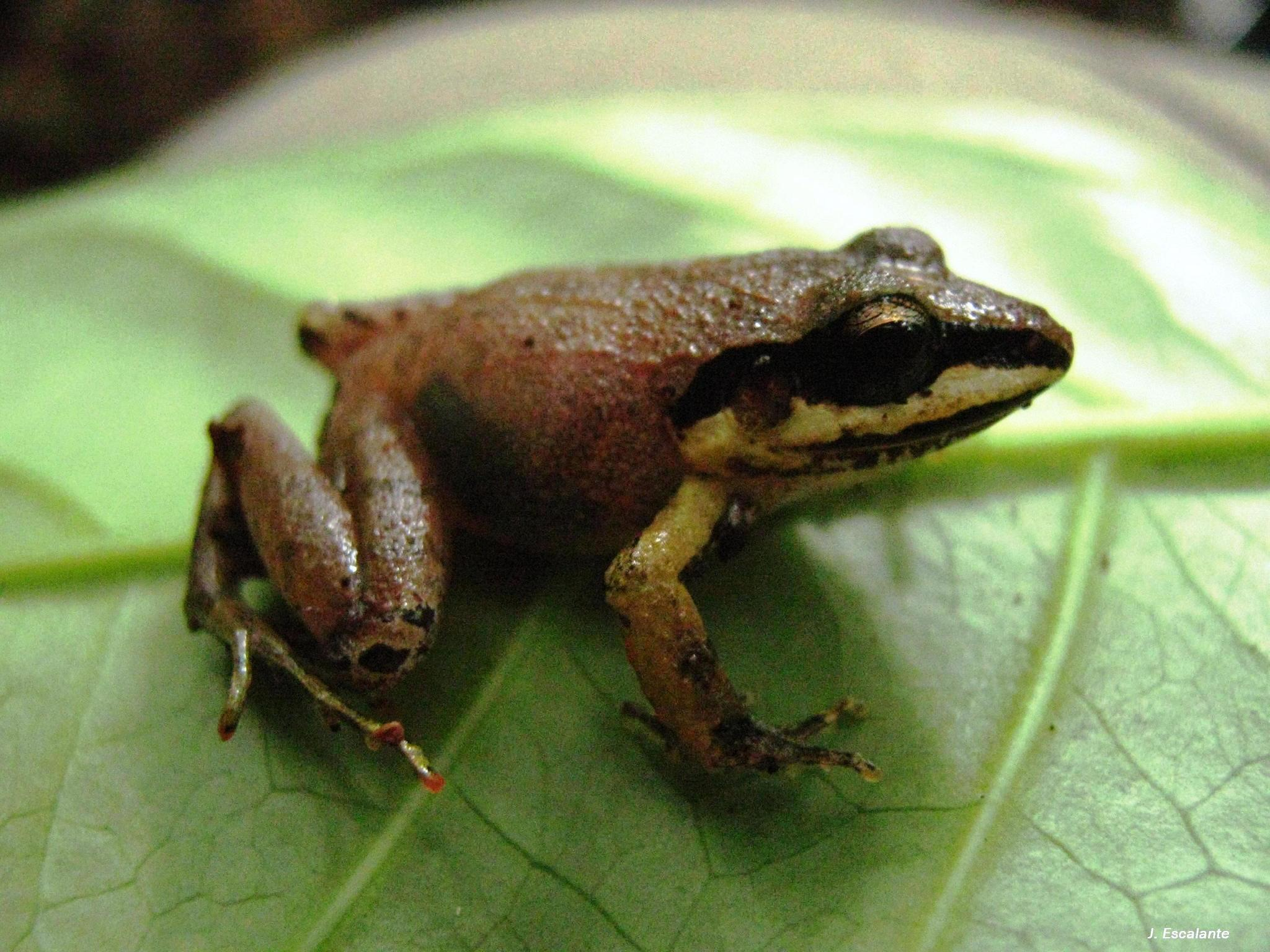

Conservation status
- Least Concern (IUCN 3.1)

Scientific classification
- Kingdom: Animalia
- Phylum: Chordata
- Class: Amphibia
- Order: Anura
- Family: Craugastoridae
- Genus: Craugastor
- Species: C. loki

Binomial name
- Craugastor loki (Shannon & Werler, 1955)

Synonyms
- Eleutherodactylus loki Shannon and Werler, 1955

= Craugastor loki =

Species of frog

Craugastor loki is a species of frog in the family Craugastoridae. It is found in Belize, El Salvador, Guatemala, Honduras, and Mexico. Its natural habitats are subtropical or tropical moist lowland forests, subtropical or tropical moist montane forests, plantations, and rural gardens. It is threatened by habitat loss.
