= Craugastor azueroensis =

Conservation status
- Endangered (IUCN 3.1)

Scientific classification
- Kingdom: Animalia
- Phylum: Chordata
- Class: Amphibia
- Order: Anura
- Clade: Brachycephaloidea
- Family: Craugastoridae
- Genus: Craugastor
- Species: C. azueroensis

Binomial name
- Craugastor azueroensis (Savage, 1975)

Species of frog

Craugastor azueroensis is a species of frog in the family Craugastoridae. It is endemic to Panama's Azuero Peninsula.

Its natural habitats are subtropical or tropical dry forests, subtropical or tropical moist montane forests, and rivers between 60 and 940 meters elevation. Its estimated extent of occurrence (EOO) is 2,213 km^{2}, which represents two threat-defined locations.

It is threatened by habitat loss.
