= Craugastor greggi =

Conservation status
- Endangered (IUCN 3.1)

Scientific classification
- Kingdom: Animalia
- Phylum: Chordata
- Class: Amphibia
- Order: Anura
- Family: Craugastoridae
- Genus: Craugastor
- Species: C. greggi

Binomial name
- Craugastor greggi (Bumzahem, 1955)

Synonyms
- Eleutherodactylus chiquito Lynch, 1965

Species of frog

Craugastor greggi is a species of frog in the family Craugastoridae. It is found in Guatemala and Mexico. Its natural habitats are subtropical or tropical moist montane forests and rivers. It is threatened by habitat loss.
