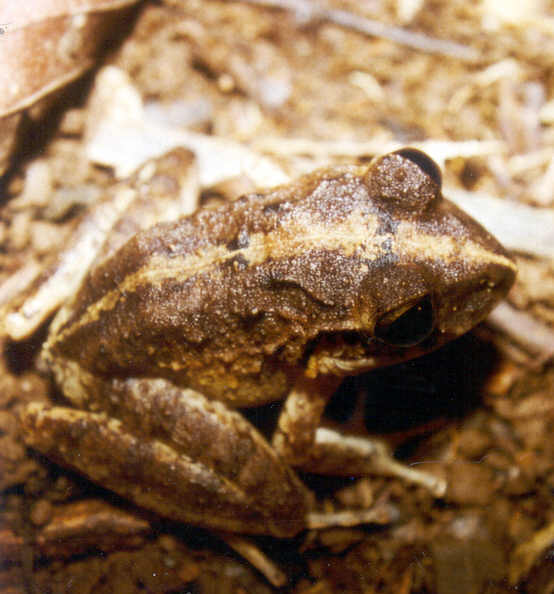

Conservation status
- Least Concern (IUCN 3.1)

Scientific classification
- Kingdom: Animalia
- Phylum: Chordata
- Class: Amphibia
- Order: Anura
- Family: Craugastoridae
- Genus: Craugastor
- Species: C. rugulosus

Binomial name
- Craugastor rugulosus (Cope, 1870)

= Craugastor rugulosus =

Species of frog

Craugastor rugulosus is a species of frog in the family Craugastoridae. It is endemic to Mexico. Its natural habitats are subtropical or tropical dry forests, subtropical or tropical moist montane forests, and rivers. It is threatened by habitat loss.
