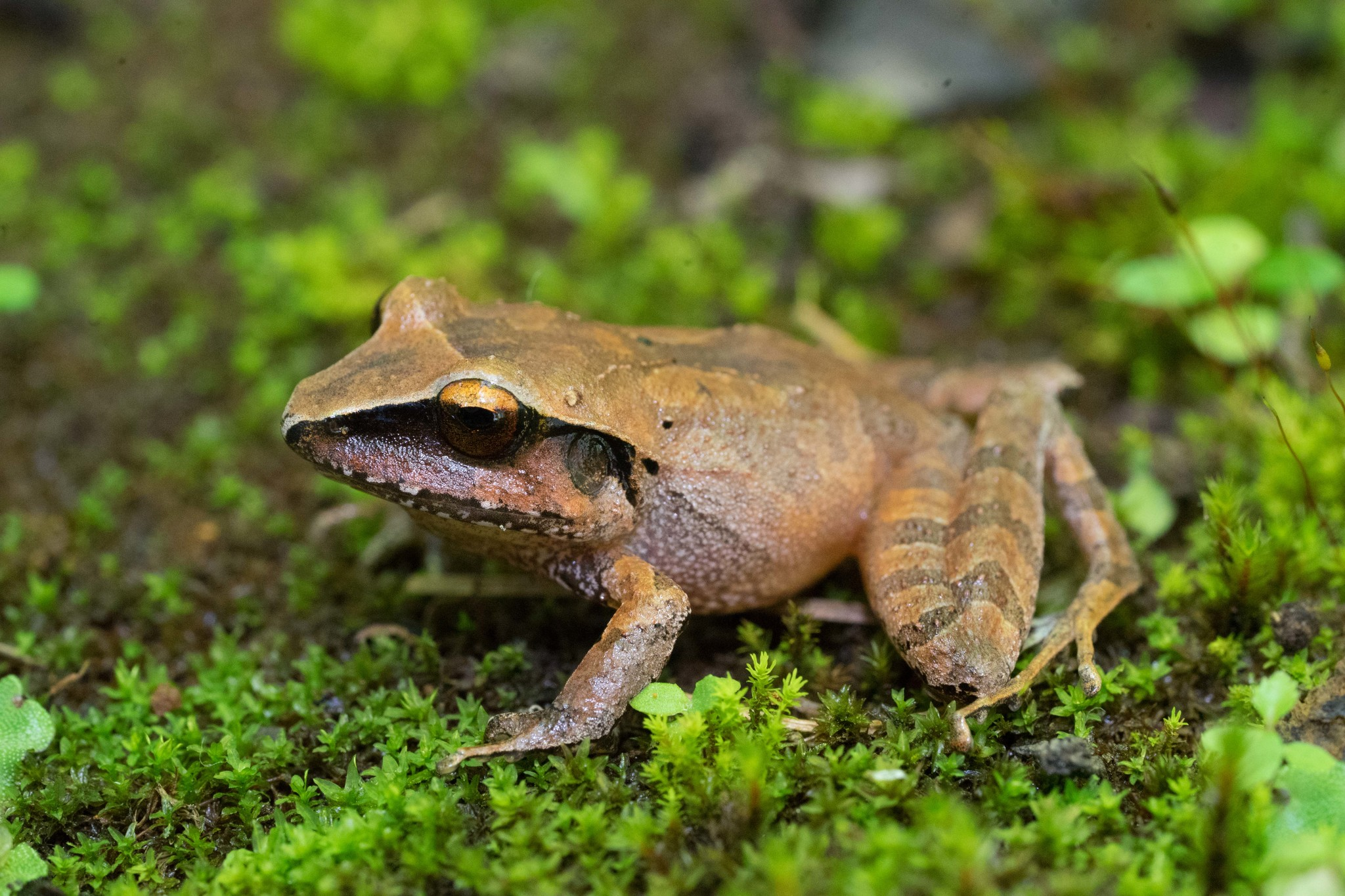

Conservation status
- Least Concern (IUCN 3.1)

Scientific classification
- Kingdom: Animalia
- Phylum: Chordata
- Class: Amphibia
- Order: Anura
- Family: Craugastoridae
- Genus: Craugastor
- Subgenus: Craugastor
- Species: C. lineatus

Binomial name
- Craugastor lineatus (Brocchi, 1879)

Synonyms
- Hylodes lineatus Brocchi, 1879; Eleutherodactylus lineatus (Brocchi, 1879); Eleutherodactylus anzuetoi Stuart, 1941; Eleutherodactylus macdougalli Taylor, 1942

= Craugastor lineatus =

Species of amphibian

Craugastor lineatus, also known as the Montane robber frog, is a species of frog in the family Craugastoridae. It is native to Guatemala and southern Mexico (Oaxaca and Chiapas) and is found in lower montane evergreen forests.
