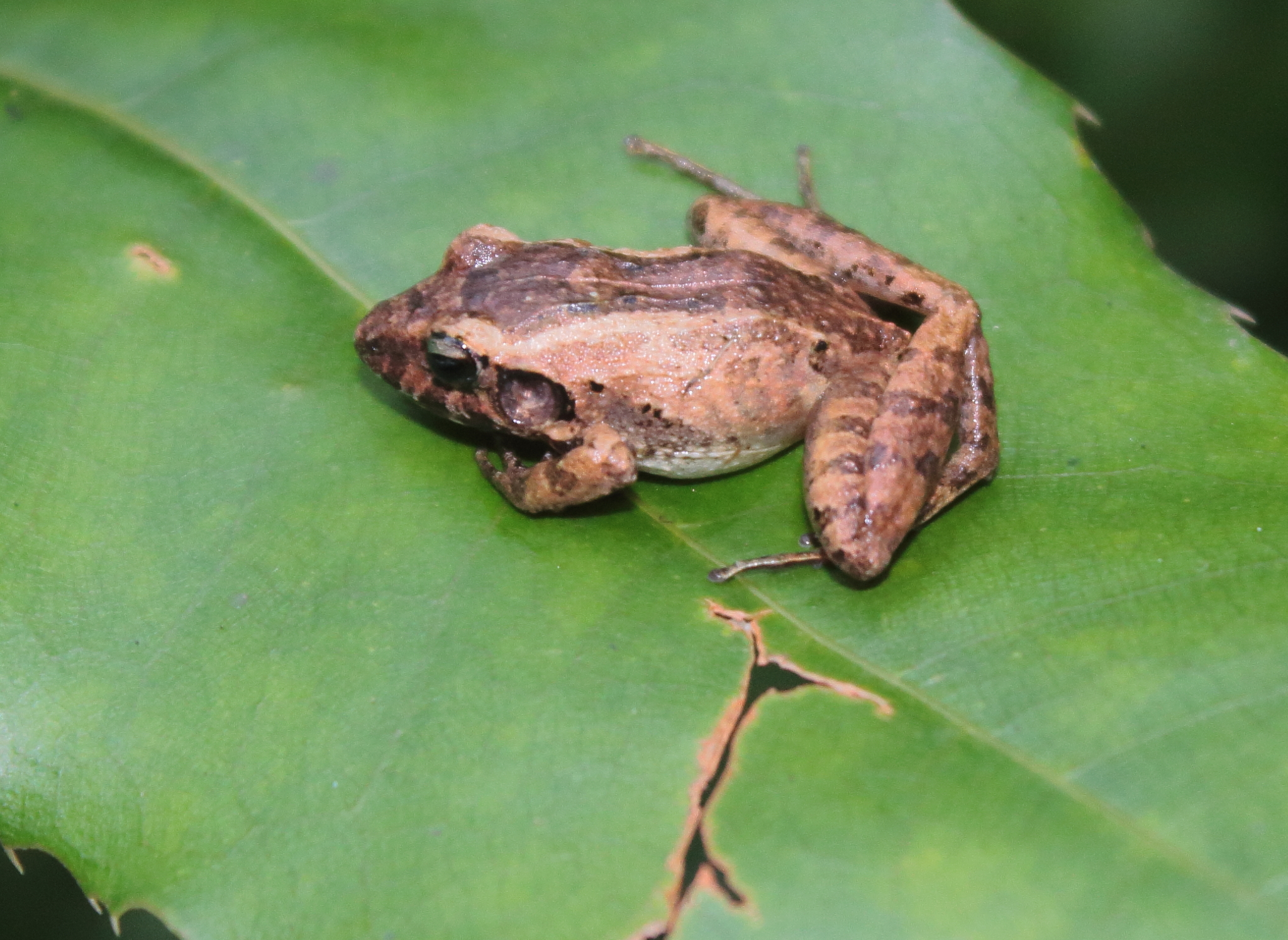

Conservation status
- Least Concern (IUCN 3.1)

Scientific classification
- Kingdom: Animalia
- Phylum: Chordata
- Class: Amphibia
- Order: Anura
- Family: Craugastoridae
- Genus: Craugastor
- Species: C. berkenbuschii

Binomial name
- Craugastor berkenbuschii (Peters, 1870)

= Craugastor berkenbuschii =

Species of frog

Craugastor berkenbuschii is a species of frog in the family Craugastoridae. It is endemic to Mexico. Its natural habitats are subtropical or tropical moist montane forests and rivers. It is threatened by habitat loss.
