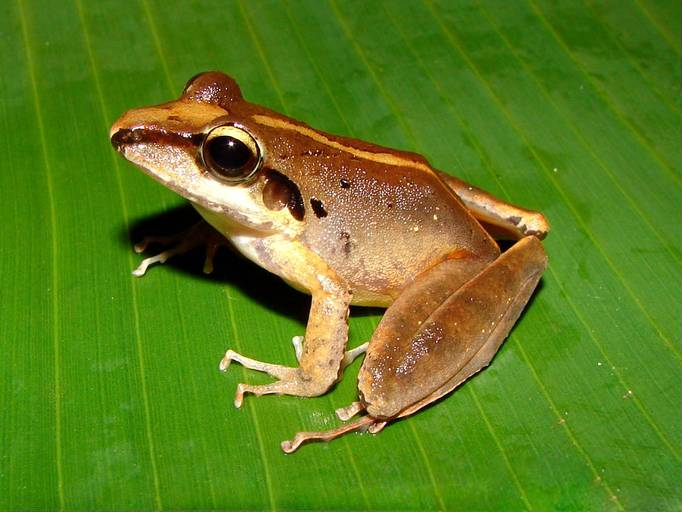

Conservation status
- Least Concern (IUCN 3.1)

Scientific classification
- Kingdom: Animalia
- Phylum: Chordata
- Class: Amphibia
- Order: Anura
- Family: Craugastoridae
- Genus: Craugastor
- Species: C. longirostris

Binomial name
- Craugastor longirostris (Boulenger, 1898)

Synonyms
- Hylodes longirostris Boulenger, 1898; Eleutherodactylus longirostris (Boulenger, 1898)

= Craugastor longirostris =

Species of frog

Craugastor longirostris is a species of frog in the family Craugastoridae. It is found in Ecuador from the Guayas Province northwards to western Colombia extreme eastern Panama, with isolated populations in the Magdalena Valley, Colombia. Its natural habitats are lowland and submontane rainforests, occasionally dry forests. It is potentially threatened by habitat loss.
