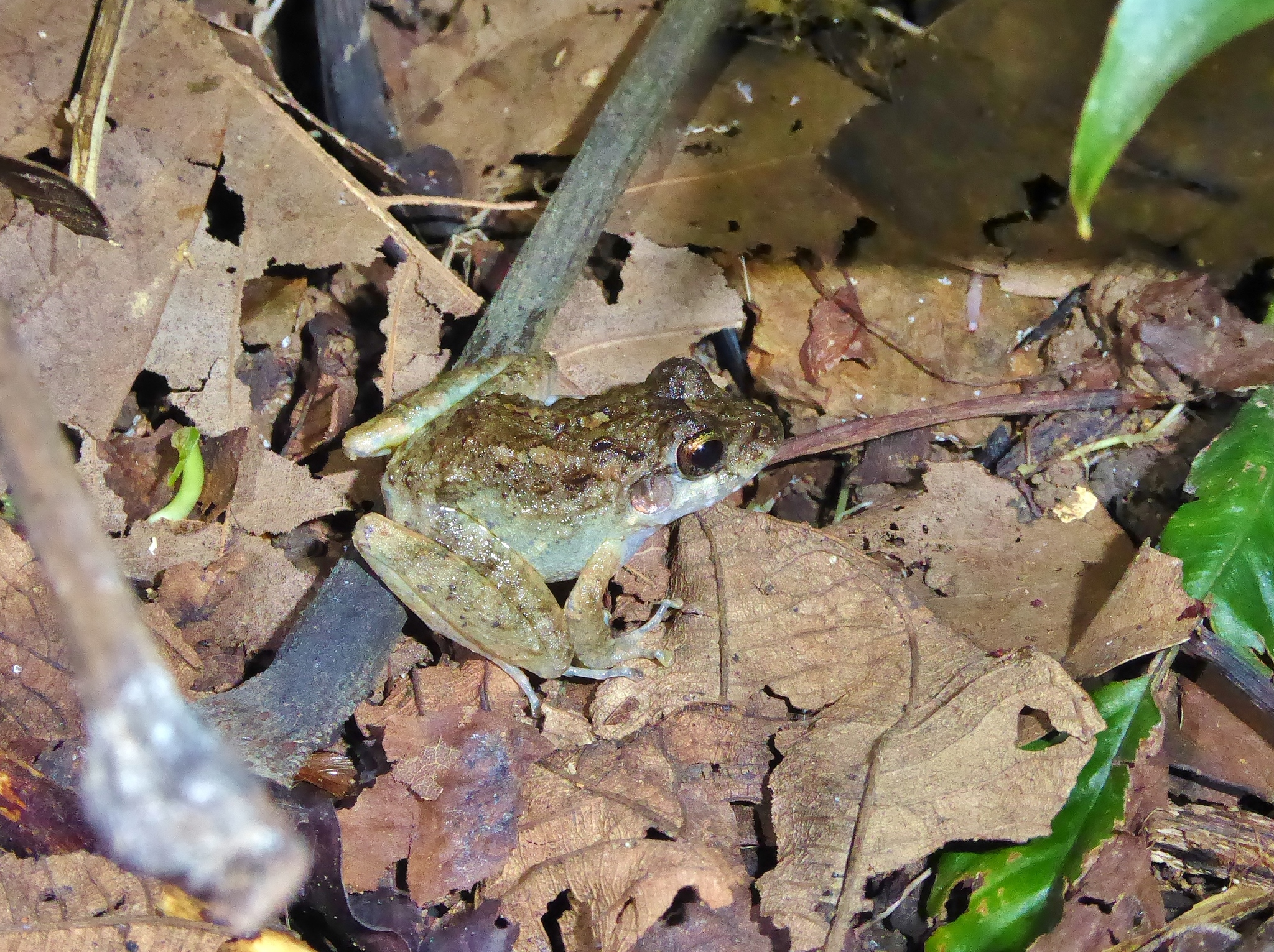

Conservation status
- Vulnerable (IUCN 3.1)

Scientific classification
- Kingdom: Animalia
- Phylum: Chordata
- Class: Amphibia
- Order: Anura
- Clade: Brachycephaloidea
- Family: Craugastoridae
- Genus: Craugastor
- Species: C. charadra

Binomial name
- Craugastor charadra (Campbell & Savage, 2000)

= Craugastor charadra =

Species of amphibian

Craugastor charadra is a species of frogs in the family Craugastoridae.

It is found in Guatemala and Honduras. Its natural habitats are subtropical or tropical moist lowland forests, subtropical or tropical moist montane forests, rivers, and plantations . It is threatened by habitat loss.
