= Craugastor lauraster =

Conservation status
- Least Concern (IUCN 3.1)

Scientific classification
- Kingdom: Animalia
- Phylum: Chordata
- Class: Amphibia
- Order: Anura
- Clade: Brachycephaloidea
- Family: Craugastoridae
- Genus: Craugastor
- Species: C. lauraster

Binomial name
- Craugastor lauraster (Savage, McCranie & Espinal, 1996)

Species of frog

Craugastor lauraster is a species of frog in the family Craugastoridae. It is found in Honduras and Nicaragua. Its natural habitats are subtropical or tropical moist lowland forests, subtropical or tropical moist montane forests, and heavily degraded former forest. It is threatened by habitat loss.
