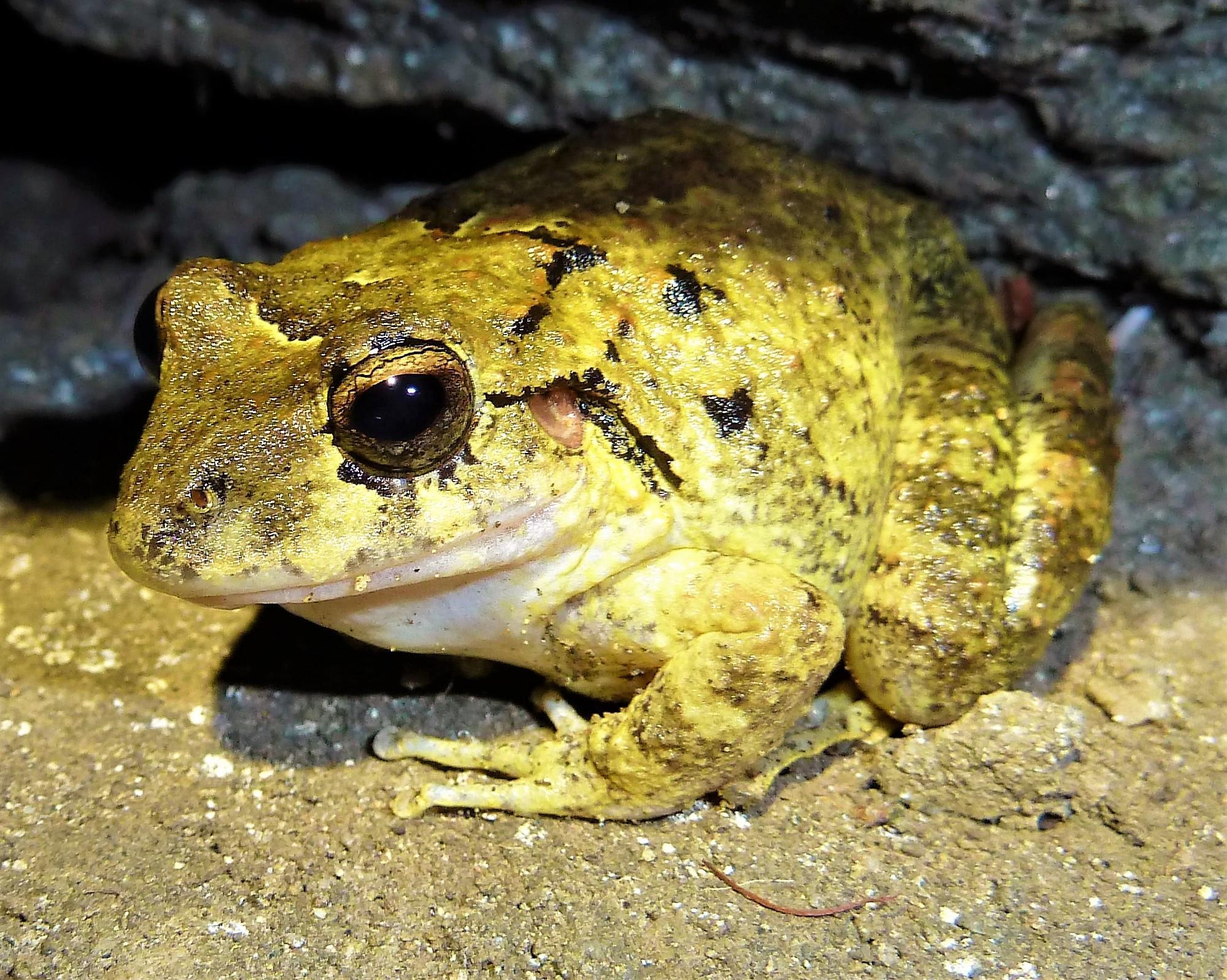

Conservation status
- Critically Endangered (IUCN 3.1)

Scientific classification
- Kingdom: Animalia
- Phylum: Chordata
- Class: Amphibia
- Order: Anura
- Clade: Brachycephaloidea
- Family: Craugastoridae
- Genus: Craugastor
- Species: C. inachus

Binomial name
- Craugastor inachus (Campbell & Savage, 2000)

= Craugastor inachus =

Species of amphibian

Craugastor inachus is a species of frogs in the family Craugastoridae.

It is endemic to Guatemala. Its natural habitats are subtropical or tropical dry forests and rivers. It is threatened by habitat loss.
