= Gunther's robber frog =

Conservation status
- Least Concern (IUCN 3.1)

Scientific classification
- Kingdom: Animalia
- Phylum: Chordata
- Class: Amphibia
- Order: Anura
- Family: Craugastoridae
- Genus: Craugastor
- Species: C. omiltemanus

Binomial name
- Craugastor omiltemanus (Günther, 1900)

Synonyms
- Syrrhaphus omiltemanus Günther, 1900; Eleutherodactylus omiltemanus (Günther, 1900); Hylodes calcitrans Günther, 1900; Eleutherodactylus calcitrans (Günther, 1900)

Species of amphibian

Gunther's robber frog, Günther's robber frog, or Guerreran robber frog (Craugastor omiltemanus, in Spanish rana-ladrona de Omilteme) is a species of frog in the family Craugastoridae. It is endemic to the Sierra Madre del Sur in the Mexican state of Guerrero. Its natural habitats are pine, oak, and pine-oak forests with plenty of leaf-litter on the ground. It is a relatively common species but declining and threatened by habitat loss and disturbance.

== Conservation ==
In Mexico, the frog has been protected under the Mexican law. The Gunther's Robber Frog is need of conservation protection of their habitat and is being looked over at the Omiltemi Ecological State Park.
