= Craugastor emcelae =

Conservation status
- Critically Endangered (IUCN 3.1)

Scientific classification
- Kingdom: Animalia
- Phylum: Chordata
- Class: Amphibia
- Order: Anura
- Clade: Brachycephaloidea
- Family: Craugastoridae
- Genus: Craugastor
- Species: C. emcelae

Binomial name
- Craugastor emcelae (Lynch, 1985)

Species of frog

Craugastor emcelae is a species of frog in the family Craugastoridae. It is found in Panama and possibly Costa Rica. Its natural habitats are subtropical or tropical moist lowland forests and subtropical or tropical moist montane forests. It is threatened by habitat loss.
