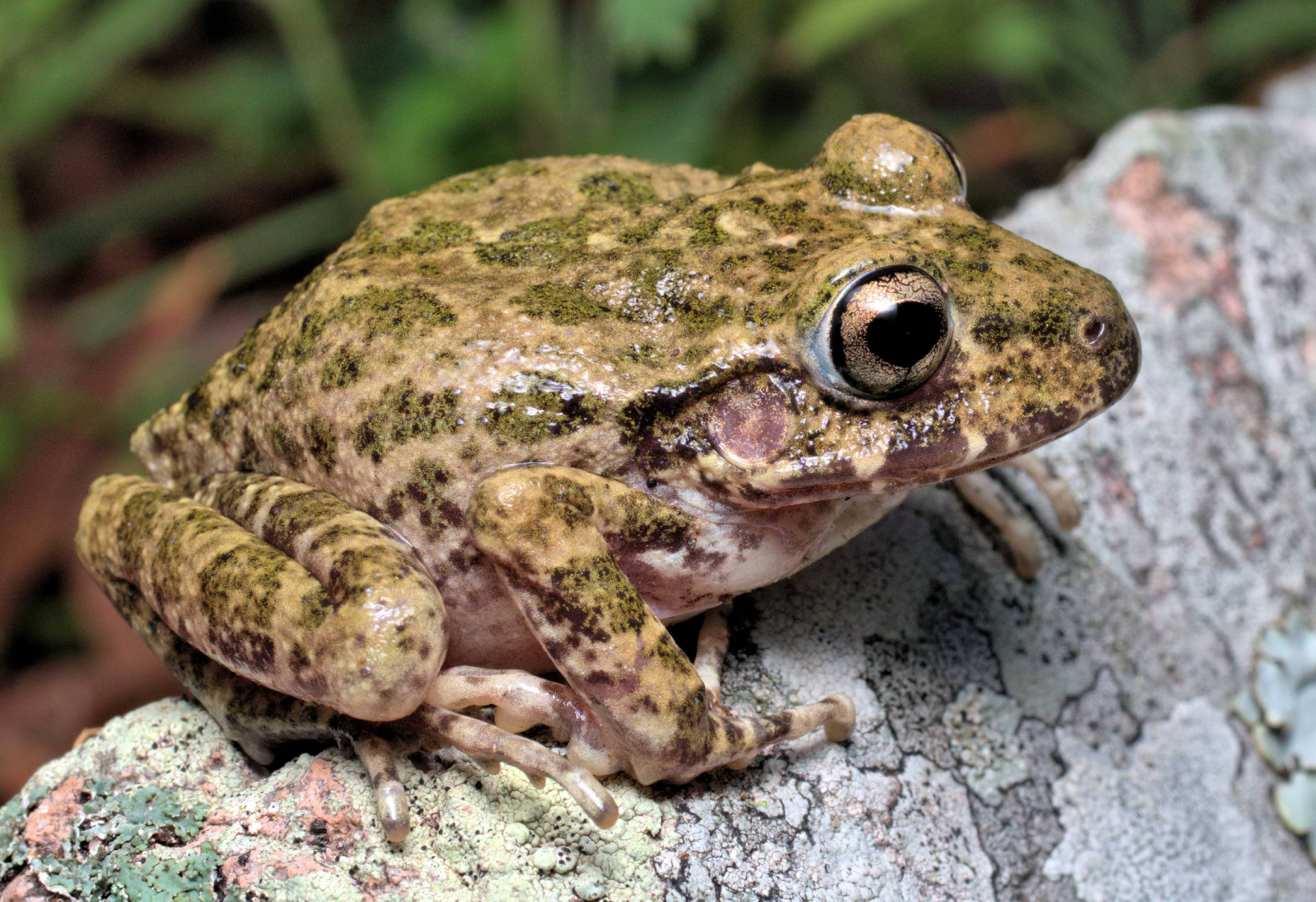

Conservation status
- Least Concern (IUCN 3.1)

Scientific classification
- Kingdom: Animalia
- Phylum: Chordata
- Class: Amphibia
- Order: Anura
- Family: Craugastoridae
- Genus: Craugastor
- Species: C. tarahumaraensis

Binomial name
- Craugastor tarahumaraensis (Taylor, 1940)

Synonyms
- Eleutherodactylus tarahumaraensis Taylor, 1940

= Craugastor tarahumaraensis =

Species of frog

Craugastor tarahumaraensis is a species of frog in the family Craugastoridae. It is endemic to Mexico and known from the Sierra Madre Occidental between the eastern Sonora and western Chihuahua in the north and Jalisco in the south. Its common name is Tarahumara barking frog. The type locality is Mojárachic, in the Tarahumara Mountains, Chihuahua.

== Description ==
Craugastor tarahumaraensis was described based on a single female, the holotype, measuring 43 mm (1.7 in) in snout–vent length. The head is wider than the relatively slender body. The tympanum is distinct, little wider than half width of the eye. The supra-tympanic fold is present. The skin of the dorsum has small pustules or granules. The legs are relatively long and slender. The fingers and toes are without webbing, but the toes are bordered by very narrow lateral folds or ridges.

== Habitat and conservation ==
The species inhabits pine-oak and pine forests at elevations around 2,400 m (7,900 ft) above sea level. It is a terrestrial species living under bark and leaves. The development is direct (i.e., without free-living tadpole stage).

The main threat for Craugastor tarahumaraensis is habitat loss and disturbance caused by logging and agriculture.
