= Craugastor persimilis =

Conservation status
- Least Concern (IUCN 3.1)

Scientific classification
- Kingdom: Animalia
- Phylum: Chordata
- Class: Amphibia
- Order: Anura
- Clade: Brachycephaloidea
- Family: Craugastoridae
- Genus: Craugastor
- Species: C. persimilis

Binomial name
- Craugastor persimilis (Barbour, 1926)

Synonyms
- Eleutherodactylus persimilis Barbour, 1926; Microbatrachylus persimilis (Barbour, 1926)

Species of frog

Craugastor persimilis is a species of frog in the family Craugastoridae. It is found in the lowlands and premontane Atlantic slopes of central to southeastern Costa Rica. Its natural habitats are lowland and premontane moist rainforest. It lives in leaf-litter and can persist in moderately disturbed areas, including plantations. It is an adaptable species that is not considered threatened, despite severe habitat fragmentation within its range.

Craugastor persimilis are small frogs: males grow to a snout–vent length of 13–18 mm (0.51–0.71 in) and females to 13–23 mm (0.51–0.91 in).
