= Craugastor stadelmani =

Conservation status
- Critically Endangered (IUCN 3.1)

Scientific classification
- Kingdom: Animalia
- Phylum: Chordata
- Class: Amphibia
- Order: Anura
- Family: Craugastoridae
- Genus: Craugastor
- Subgenus: Campbellius
- Species: C. stadelmani

Binomial name
- Craugastor stadelmani (Schmidt, 1936)

Synonyms
- Eleutherodactylus stadelmani Schmidt, 1936

Species of amphibian

Craugastor stadelmani is a rare species of frog in the family Craugastoridae. It is endemic to the mountains of northern Honduras. The specific name stadelmani honors Raymond Edward Stadelman, curator at the Tela serpentarium and naturalist at the Museum of Comparative Zoology. Common names Stadelman's coqui, Stadelman's patterlove, and north-central Honduran montane streamside frog have been coined for it.

== Description ==
Adult males measure 27–33 mm (1.1–1.3 in) and adult females 33–47 mm (1.3–1.9 in) in snout–vent length. The snout is nearly rounded to rounded in dorsal view and rounded to nearly vertical in lateral profile. The tympanum is at best barely visible in males and is not visible in females. The fingers have discs and lateral keels but no webbing. The toes have discs and moderate webbing. The dorsal surfaces of the head and body are medium brown; there are some dark brown ridges and large tubercles. The ventral surfaces are pale grey or brown with brown flecking. Males have a single subgular vocal sac, although this is not evident externally.

== Habitat and conservation ==
Craugastor stadelmani occurs in premontane and lower montane wet forests at elevations of 1,125–1,900 m (3,691–6,234 ft) above sea level. Reproduction takes place through direct development (i.e., without free-living larval stage) on the ground along streams.

Craugastor stadelmani was formerly a relatively common species, but populations underwent dramatic declines in the 1990s. In 2004, the species was considered critically endangered, even possibly extinct, with no recent observations from the surveyed sites. The decline was probably caused by habitat loss, although chytridiomycosis may also have played a role, given that the species disappeared also from pristine sites; several populations occurred within protected areas. However, two living specimens were discovered in 2010 at one of sites where the species had apparently disappeared. Nevertheless, habitat loss remains a grave concern for the survival of this species. The only specimen tested for chytridiomycosis gave a negative result.
