= Craugastor monnichorum =

Conservation status
- Endangered (IUCN 3.1)

Scientific classification
- Kingdom: Animalia
- Phylum: Chordata
- Class: Amphibia
- Order: Anura
- Family: Craugastoridae
- Genus: Craugastor
- Subgenus: Craugastor
- Species: C. monnichorum

Binomial name
- Craugastor monnichorum (Dunn, 1940)

Synonyms
- Eleutherodactylus monnichorum Dunn, 1940

Species of frog

Craugastor monnichorum is a species of frog in the family Craugastoridae. It is endemic to the mountains of western Panama in the Chiriquí Province; the type locality is on the slope of Volcán Barú. The specific name monnichorum honors the Monniche family, owners of the property where the type series was collected. However, the common name coined for this species, Dunn's robber frog, refers instead to the scientist who described the species, Emmett Reid Dunn.

== Description ==
Adult males measure at least 45 mm (1.8 in) and adult females 61 mm (2.4 in) in snout–vent length. The snout is flat and broad. The tympanum is small (especially in females) but visible. Supratympanic and dorsolater folds are present. The finger and toe discs are well-developed, and the two outermost finger discs are particularly large. The toes have basal webbing. Dorsal coloration in adults is dark brown with considerable variation in shade and patterns between individuals.

== Habitat and conservation ==
Craugastor monnichorum occurs in humid montane forests at elevations of about 1,400–1,830 m (4,590–6,000 ft) above sea level. It can be found on the ground, rocks, and in low vegetation. The development is direct (i.e., there is no free-living larval stage). The main threat to this species presumably is habitat loss (deforestation). It is present in the Volcán Barú National Park and the La Amistad International Park.
