= Craugastor rhyacobatrachus =

Conservation status
- Critically Endangered (IUCN 3.1)

Scientific classification
- Kingdom: Animalia
- Phylum: Chordata
- Class: Amphibia
- Order: Anura
- Family: Craugastoridae
- Genus: Craugastor
- Subgenus: Craugastor
- Species: C. rhyacobatrachus

Binomial name
- Craugastor rhyacobatrachus (Campbell and Savage, 2000)

Synonyms
- Eleutherodactylus rhyacobatrachus Campbell and Savage, 2000

Species of amphibian

Craugastor rhyacobatrachus is a species of frogs in the family Craugastoridae. It is found in the Pacific slopes of the Talamanca-Barú Massif of Costa Rica and western Panama. The specific name rhyacobatrachus is derived from Greek batrachos (for "frog") and rhyaco ("torrent"), in reference to the torrential streams that this species inhabits.

== Description ==
Adult males measure 40–50 mm (1.6–2.0 in) and adult females 55–81 mm (2.2–3.2 in) in snout–vent length. The snout is subelliptical to elliptical from above and rounded in profile. The upper eye is covered with large tubercles. The tympanum is distinct. The fingers have large discs and weak lateral fringes. The toes have large discs, definite fringes, and are heavily webbed. Skin is dorsally very rugose. The dorsum is tan to olive brown, heavily spotted or blotched with even darker markings. The posterior thigh surface has pale yellow and brown mottling. The venter is pale yellow and is heavily marked brown, as is the throat and chest.

== Habitat and conservation ==
Natural habitats of Craugastor rhyacobatrachus are streams in streams within humid montane forests at elevations of 950–1,800 m (3,120–5,910 ft) above sea level. It is associated with rocks and waterfalls, normally found at night sitting or foraging on rocks in mountain streams. This species was once quite common where it occurred. It appears to have gone extinct in Costa Rica, where, as of 2007, it has not been seen after 1964. It is also believed to have declined in Panama. In addition to habitat loss, the decline is assumed to be caused by chytridiomycosis.
