= Craugastor xucanebi =

Conservation status
- Vulnerable (IUCN 3.1)

Scientific classification
- Kingdom: Animalia
- Phylum: Chordata
- Class: Amphibia
- Order: Anura
- Family: Craugastoridae
- Genus: Craugastor
- Species: C. xucanebi

Binomial name
- Craugastor xucanebi (Stuart, 1941)

Synonyms
- Eleutherodactylus xucanebi Stuart, 1941

Species of frog

Craugastor xucanebi is a species of frog in the family Craugastoridae. It is endemic to Guatemala.

== Habitat ==
The species is known from the central highlands of Guatemala, including Sierra de los Cuchumatanes, Sierra de Xucaneb, and Sierra de las Minas. Its natural habitats are premontane and montane forests at elevations of 600–1,300 m (2,000–4,300 ft) above sea level. It typically occurs in bushes and undergrowth, and might also be found in slightly degraded forest.

== Threats ==
It is threatened by habitat loss caused by agricultural encroachment, extraction of wood, and human settlement.
