= Craugastor psephosypharus =

Conservation status
- Near Threatened (IUCN 3.1)

Scientific classification
- Kingdom: Animalia
- Phylum: Chordata
- Class: Amphibia
- Order: Anura
- Clade: Brachycephaloidea
- Family: Craugastoridae
- Genus: Craugastor
- Species: C. psephosypharus

Binomial name
- Craugastor psephosypharus (Campbell, Savage & Meyer, 1994)

Species of frog

Craugastor psephosypharus is a species of frog in the family Craugastoridae. It is found in Belize, Guatemala, and possibly Honduras. Its natural habitats are subtropical or tropical moist lowland forests, subtropical or tropical moist montane forests, rocky areas, and caves. It is threatened by habitat loss.
