= Craugastor rivulus =

Conservation status
- Vulnerable (IUCN 3.1)

Scientific classification
- Kingdom: Animalia
- Phylum: Chordata
- Class: Amphibia
- Order: Anura
- Clade: Brachycephaloidea
- Family: Craugastoridae
- Genus: Craugastor
- Species: C. rivulus

Binomial name
- Craugastor rivulus Campbell & Savage, 2000

Species of amphibian

Craugastor rivulus is a species of frogs in the family Craugastoridae.

It is endemic to Guatemala. Its natural habitats are subtropical or tropical moist lowland forests, subtropical or tropical moist montane forests, and rivers. It is threatened by habitat loss.
