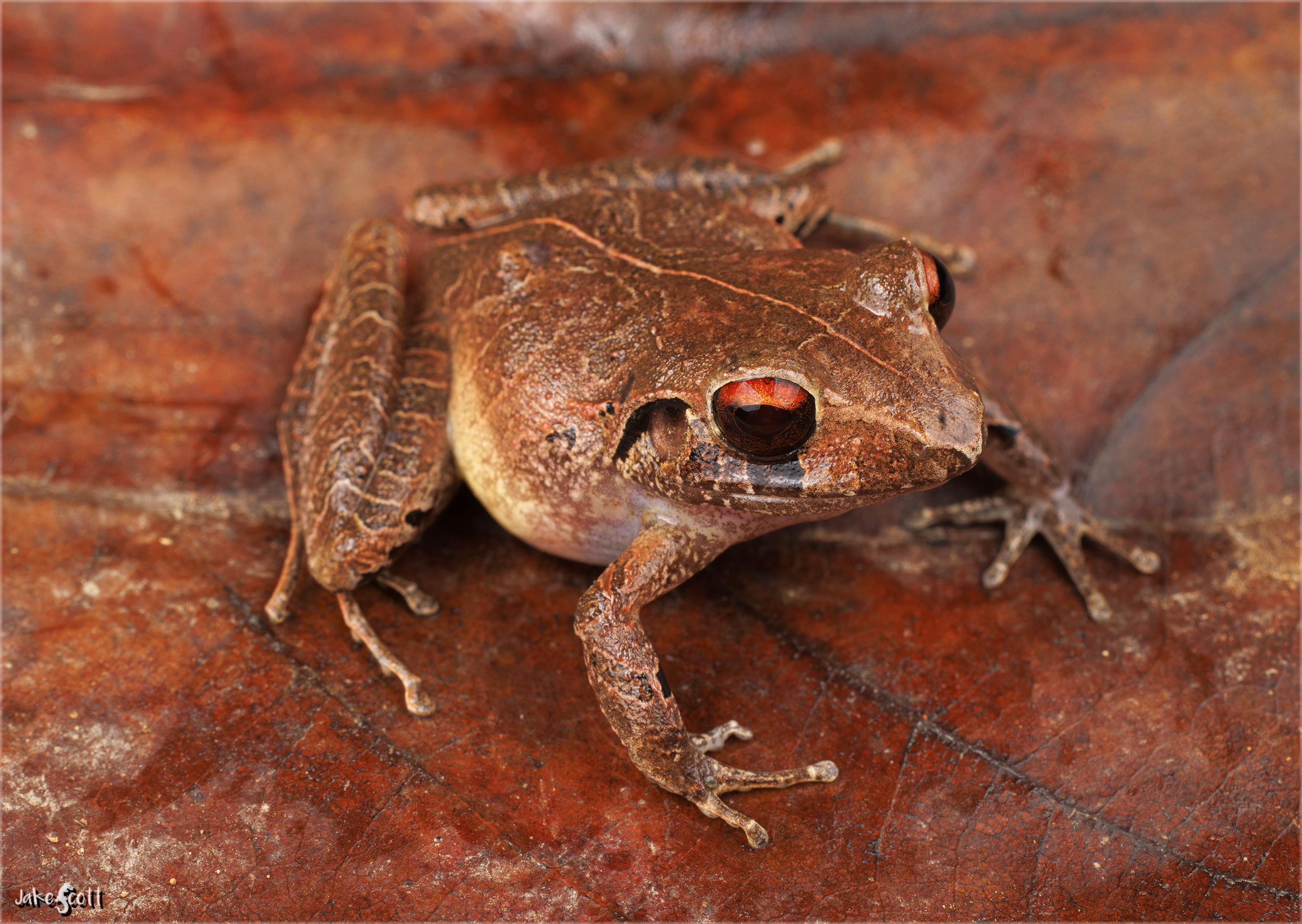

Conservation status
- Least Concern (IUCN 3.1)

Scientific classification
- Kingdom: Animalia
- Phylum: Chordata
- Class: Amphibia
- Order: Anura
- Clade: Brachycephaloidea
- Family: Craugastoridae
- Genus: Craugastor
- Species: C. chac

Binomial name
- Craugastor chac (Savage, 1987)

= Craugastor chac =

Species of frog

Craugastor chac is a species of frog in the family Craugastoridae. It is found in Belize, Guatemala, and Honduras. Its natural habitats are subtropical or tropical moist lowland forests, subtropical or tropical moist montane forests, plantations, and heavily degraded former forest. It is threatened by habitat loss.

Craugastor chac can be distinguished from similar species by its iris coloration. It has a red upper half and a maroon lower half.
