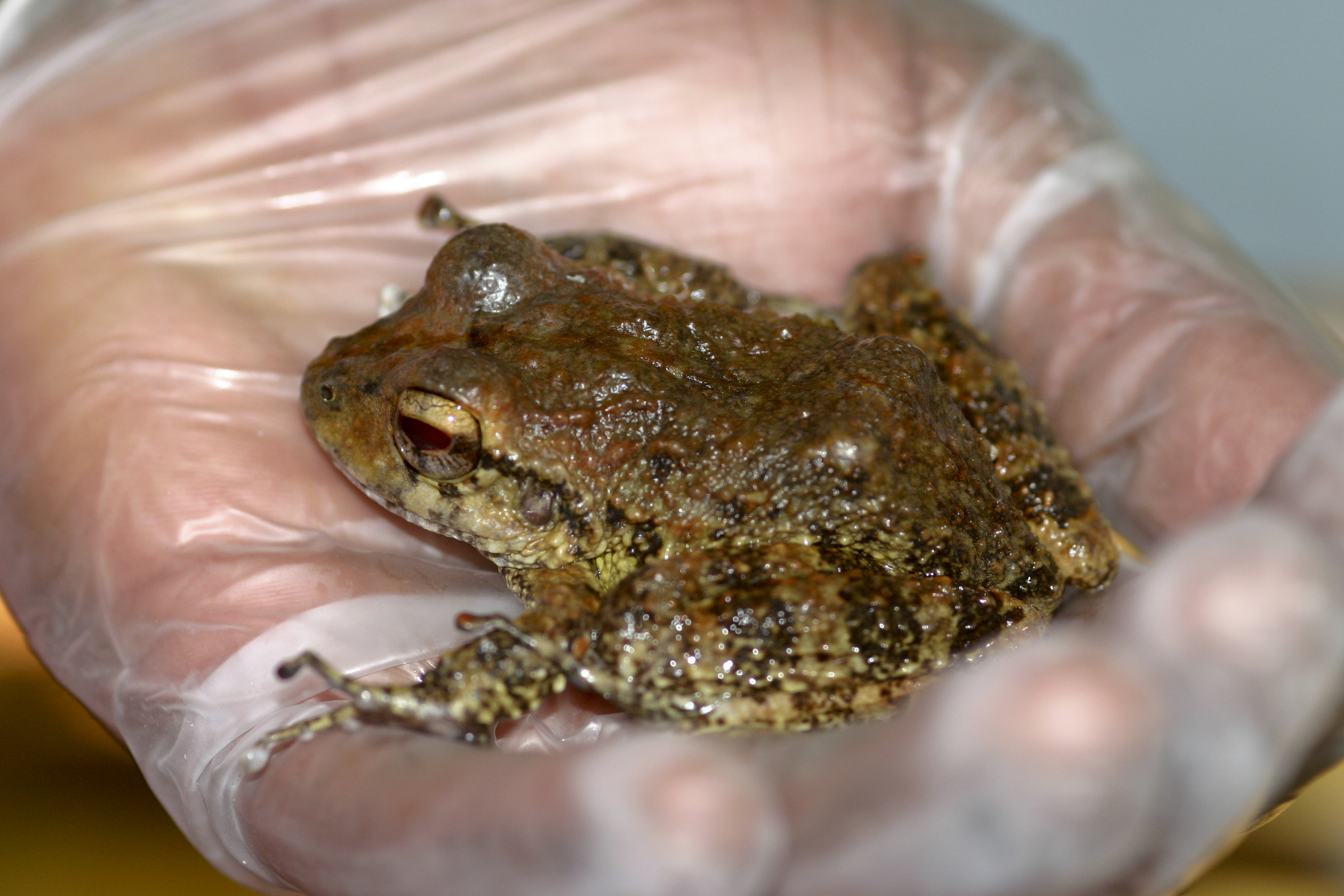

Conservation status
- Critically endangered, possibly extinct (IUCN 3.1)

Scientific classification
- Kingdom: Animalia
- Phylum: Chordata
- Class: Amphibia
- Order: Anura
- Family: Craugastoridae
- Genus: Craugastor
- Species: C. punctariolus

Binomial name
- Craugastor punctariolus (Peters, 1863)

= Craugastor punctariolus =

Species of frog

Craugastor punctariolus is a species of frog in the family Craugastoridae. It is endemic to Panama. Its natural habitats are subtropical or tropical moist montane forests, rivers, and intermittent rivers. It is threatened by habitat loss.

A study done from 1999 to 2005 showed that Craugastor punctariolus is one of many frog species whose population was decimated by an outbreak of Batrachochytrium dendrobatidis among the population.
