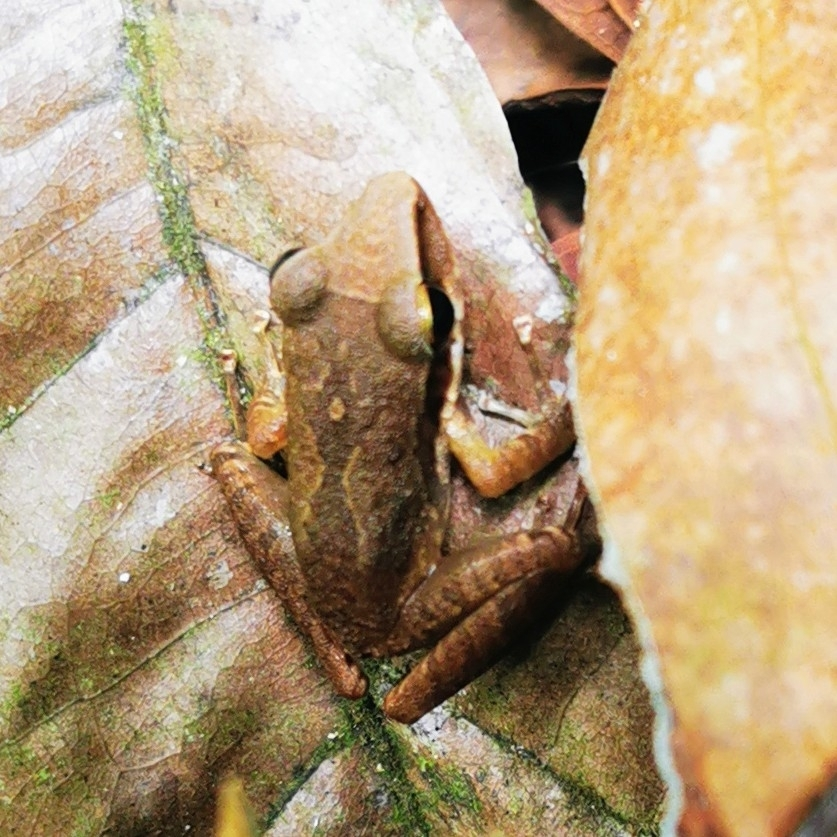

Conservation status
- Least Concern (IUCN 3.1)

Scientific classification
- Kingdom: Animalia
- Phylum: Chordata
- Class: Amphibia
- Order: Anura
- Family: Craugastoridae
- Genus: Craugastor
- Species: C. talamancae

Binomial name
- Craugastor talamancae (Dunn, 1931)

Synonyms
- Eleutherodactylus talamancae Dunn, 1931

= Craugastor talamancae =

Species of frog

Craugastor talamancae is a species of frog in the family Craugastoridae. It is found in the Atlantic versant of Panama, Costa Rica, and southeastern Nicaragua. Common name Almirante robber frog has been proposed for it.

== Description ==
Males grow to 30 mm (1.2 in) and females to 50 mm (2.0 in) in snout–vent length. The limbs are long. The toes are moderately webbed. Dorsal color is typically brown. A dark bar running through the eye and barring on the arms and legs is characteristic for this species. The ventral surfaces are white, with some yellow coloration towards the posterior parts. The throat may have a reddish shade. The iris is golden above and brown below. Juveniles have a prominent white lip line.

The male advertisement call is a high-pitched mew.

== Habitat and conservation ==
Craugastor talamancae in humid lowland and montane secondary and old growth forests at elevations of 15–646 m (49–2,119 ft) above sea level. It can sometimes occur in modified habitats. It is a nocturnal frog that hides in leaf litter during the day, but typically moves to low-lying vegetation at night. The diet consists of small arthropods other than hemipterans.

Craugastor talamancae is common in parts of its range but has declined and is rare in others. It is known from several protected areas. It is threatened by habitat loss (deforestation caused by agriculture and logging). Chytrid fungus has also been detected in the species. It is also threatened by climate-driven reductions in quantity of standing leaf litter.
