= Craugastor melanostictus =

Conservation status
- Least Concern (IUCN 3.1)

Scientific classification
- Kingdom: Animalia
- Phylum: Chordata
- Class: Amphibia
- Order: Anura
- Family: Craugastoridae
- Genus: Craugastor
- Species: C. melanostictus

Binomial name
- Craugastor melanostictus (Cope, 1875)

Synonyms
- Hylodes platyrhynchus Günther, 1900

Species of frog

Craugastor melanostictus is a species of frog in the family Craugastoridae. It is found in Costa Rica and Panama. Its natural habitat is subtropical or tropical moist montane forests. It is threatened by habitat loss.
