= Craugastor megalotympanum =

Conservation status
- Endangered (IUCN 3.1)

Scientific classification
- Kingdom: Animalia
- Phylum: Chordata
- Class: Amphibia
- Order: Anura
- Family: Craugastoridae
- Genus: Craugastor
- Species: C. megalotympanum

Binomial name
- Craugastor megalotympanum (Shannon and Werler, 1955)

Synonyms
- Eleutherodactylus megalotympanum Shannon and Werler, 1955

Species of frog

Craugastor megalotympanum is a species of frog in the family Craugastoridae. It is endemic to the Sierra de los Tuxtlas range in southern Veracruz state, Mexico.

Its natural habitat is lowland tropical humid rainforest. Despite its whole range being within the Los Tuxtlas Biosphere Reserve, it is suffering from habitat loss.
