= Craugastor brocchi =

Conservation status
- Vulnerable (IUCN 3.1)

Scientific classification
- Kingdom: Animalia
- Phylum: Chordata
- Class: Amphibia
- Order: Anura
- Family: Craugastoridae
- Genus: Craugastor
- Species: C. brocchi

Binomial name
- Craugastor brocchi (Boulenger, 1882)

Species of frog

Craugastor brocchi is a species of frog in the family Craugastoridae. It is found in Guatemala and Mexico. Its natural habitats are subtropical or tropical moist montane forests and rivers. It is threatened by habitat loss.
