= Sierra del Mico =

Small mountain range in Guatemala

- Montañas del Mico
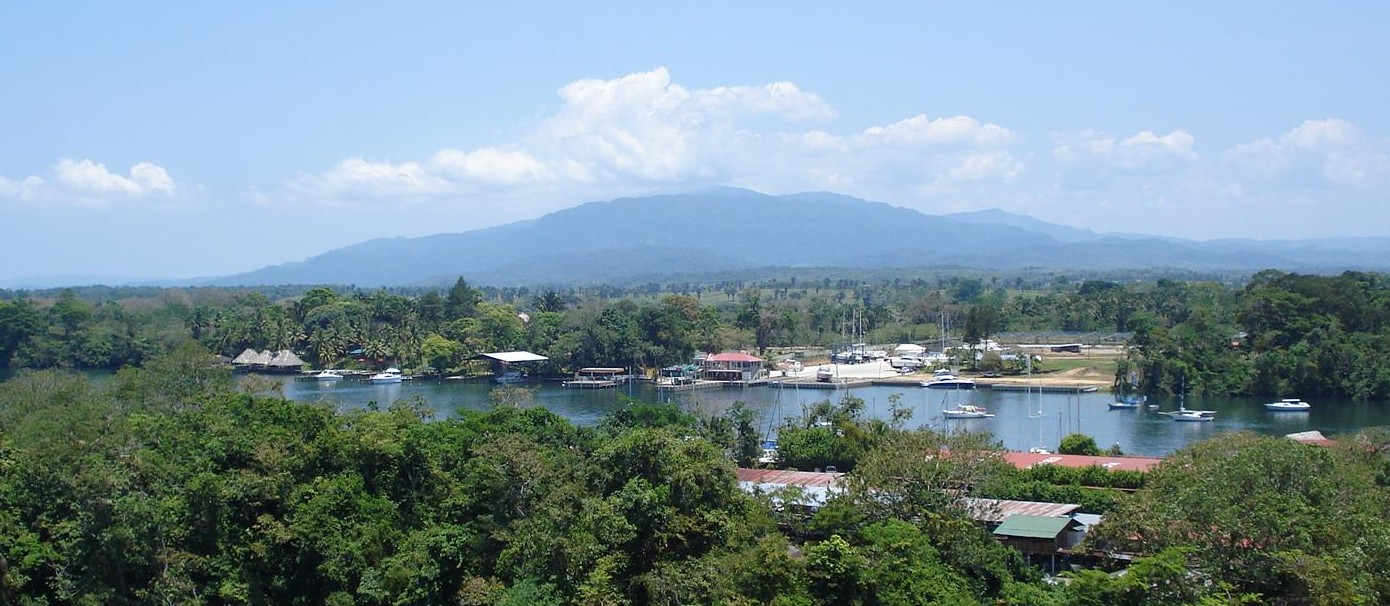

Highest point
- Peak: Cerro San Gil
- Elevation: 1,267 m (4,157 ft)
- Coordinates: 15°40′14″N 88°47′11″W

Dimensions
- Length: 60 km (37 mi)

Geography
- Location within Guatemala
- Country: Guatemala
- Region: Izabal

The Sierra del Mico (or Montañas del Mico) is a small mountain range northeast of the Sierra de las Minas, near Puerto Barrios. It is approximately 60 km long and drops eastwards into the Caribbean sea. Its highest peak is the Cerro San Gil with an elevation of 1,267 m.
