= Canthus (herpetology) =

Feature of a amphibians' and reptiles' head

In snakes and amphibians, the canthus, canthal ridge or canthus rostralis is the angle between the flat crown of the head and the side of the head between the eye and the snout, or more specifically, between the supraocular scale and the rostral scale. It is defined as a sharp ridge in many viperids, but is rounded in most rattlesnakes, for example.
