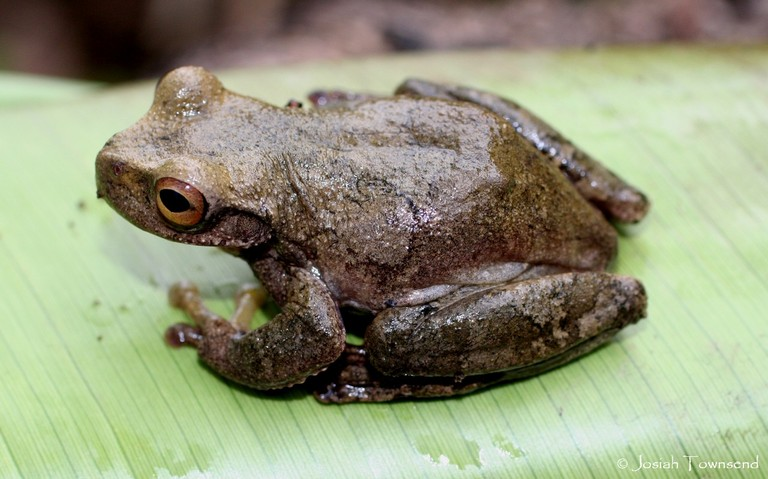
- Atlantihyla spinipollex

Scientific classification
- Kingdom: Animalia
- Phylum: Chordata
- Class: Amphibia
- Order: Anura
- Family: Hylidae
- Subfamily: Hylinae
- Genus: Atlantihyla; Faivovich et al., 2018

Type species
- Hyla spinipollex K. P. Schmidt, 1936

Species
- 3 species (see text)

= Atlantihyla =

Genus of amphibians

Atlantihyla is a genus of frogs in the family Hylidae. It is endemic to Central America, specifically to Honduras and Guatemala. The generic name refers to its distribution on the Atlantic side of the isthmus (from Atlantis+hyla). The members of the genus are known as stream frogs.

== Taxonomy ==
The genus was established based on molecular data in a revision of the subfamily Hylinae by Julián Faivovich and colleagues in 2018. In order to obtain a monophyletic Ptychohyla, Faivovich and colleagues moved two former Ptychohyla species to Atlantihyla and four former Ptychohyla species to Quilticohyla. Atlantihyla has a sister group relationship to a poorly-supported clade that includes Bromeliohyla, Duellmanohyla, and Quilticohyla. A third Atlantihyla species was described in 2020.

== Description ==
The only, tentative phenotypic synapomorphy of this genus is the presence of a well-defined ventrolateral white stripe. A vertical rostral keel is present. Males measure 30–41 mm (1.2–1.6 in) and females 31–46 mm (1.2–1.8 in) in snout–vent length. The tadpoles have large oral discs.

== Species ==
There are currently three recognized species:

- Atlantihyla melissa Townsend, Herrera-B., Hofmann, Luque-Montes, Ross, Dudek, Krygeris, Duchamp, and Wilson, 2020
- Atlantihyla panchoi (Duellman and Campbell, 1982) – Guatemala stream frog
- Atlantihyla spinipollex (K. P. Schmidt, 1936) – Ceiba stream frog

The AmphibiaWeb lists this genus as monotypic, with Atlantihyla melissa as the sole species.
