= Anzuetoi arboreal alligator lizard =

Conservation status
- Critically Endangered (IUCN 3.1)
- CITES Appendix I

Scientific classification
- Kingdom: Animalia
- Phylum: Chordata
- Class: Reptilia
- Order: Squamata
- Suborder: Anguimorpha
- Family: Anguidae
- Genus: Abronia
- Species: A. anzuetoi

Binomial name
- Abronia anzuetoi Campbell & Frost, 1993

Species of lizard

The Anzuetoi arboreal alligator lizard (Abronia anzuetoi), also known commonly as Anzueto's arboreal alligator lizard, is a species of lizard in the family Anguidae. The species is endemic to Volcán de Agua in Guatemala.

== Etymology ==
The specific name, anzuetoi, is in honor of Guatemalan naturalist Roderico Anzueto, who collected the holotype.

== Conservation status ==
The estimated extent of occurrence of Abronia anzuetoi is between 17 km^{2} and 28 km^{2}, and thus the species is considered Critically Endangered by the IUCN. Anthropogenic impact is minimized by the fact that its native habitat has many landmines, and surrounding coffee plantations have been abandoned.

== Habitat ==
Abronia anzuetoi is found at elevations from 1,219–2,286 m (3,999–7,500 ft) on Volcán de Agua, inhabiting cloud forests on the mountain.

== Behaviour ==
Abronia anzuetoi is a diurnal tree-dwelling lizard. Dominant males exhibit territorial behaviour.

== Reproduction ==
Abronia anzuetoi is ovoviviparous, bearing large litters of newborns over several days.
