= Emerald frog =

Emerald frog may refer to:

- Emerald forest frog (Hylorina sylvatica), a frog in the family Batrachylidae found in Argentina and Chile
- Emerald glass frog (Centrolene prosoblepon), a frog in the family Centrolenidae found in Colombia, Costa Rica, Ecuador, Honduras, Nicaragua, and Panama
- Emerald poison frog (Ameerega smaragdinus), frog in the family Dendrobatidae endemic to Peru
- Emerald tree frog (Exerodonta smaragdina), a frog in the family Hylidae endemic to Mexico
