= Quilticohyla acrochorda =

Conservation status
- Critically Endangered (IUCN 3.1)

Scientific classification
- Kingdom: Animalia
- Phylum: Chordata
- Class: Amphibia
- Order: Anura
- Family: Hylidae
- Genus: Quilticohyla
- Species: Q. acrochorda

Binomial name
- Quilticohyla acrochorda (Campbell and Duellman, 2000)

Synonyms
- Ptychohyla acrochorda Campbell and Duellman, 2000; Hyla acrochorda (Campbell and Duellman, 2000)

Species of amphibian

Quilticohyla acrochorda, commonly known as the warty mountain stream frog, is a species of frogs in the family Hylidae. It is endemic to Mexico and known from the Atlantic slopes of the Sierra Juárez in Oaxaca. Before being described as a new species in 2000, it was mixed with Ptychohyla erythromma. The specific name acrochorda is a Greek word for "wart" and refers to the distinctive white warts on the posterior surface of the thigh of this frog.

== Description ==
Adult males measure 30–37 mm (1.2–1.5 in) and adult females 45–58 mm (1.8–2.3 in) in snout–vent length. The snout is rounded in dorsal view and truncate in profile. The supratympanic fold is thin but covers the upper edge of the tympanum. The forelimbs are moderately robust; the fingers are moderately long, have large discs, and are less than one-fourth webbed. The hind limbs are moderately long and slender. The toe discs are only slightly smaller than those on the fingers; the toes are about two-thirds webbed. The dorsal ground color is lime-green, grading into yellow-green on the sides. There is mottling that varies from brown, indistinct to more conspicuous gray or almost maroon. During the daytime, individuals sleeping on leaves have somewhat subdued turquoise-green dorsum.

The largest tadpoles (Gosner stage 37) measure 12.5 mm (0.49 in) in body length and 37.9 mm (1.49 in) in total length.

== Habitat and conservation ==
Quilticohyla acrochorda occurs in mesic cloud forests at elevations of 594–900 m (1,949–2,953 ft) above sea level. Males call perched on branches or bushes along streams. The tadpoles develop in streams. The habitat of this species is threatened by habitat loss caused by small-scale farming and wood extraction; chytridiomycosis is also a potential threat.
