= N. brodiei =

N. brodiei may refer to:

- Neolithodes brodiei, Brodie's king crab, a species of king crab
- Nototriton brodiei, a species of salamander in the family Plethodontidae
