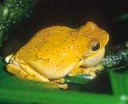
- Tlalocohyla loquax

Scientific classification
- Kingdom: Animalia
- Phylum: Chordata
- Class: Amphibia
- Order: Anura
- Family: Hylidae
- Subfamily: Hylinae
- Genus: Tlalocohyla; Faivovich, Haddad, Garcia, Frost, Campbell, and Wheeler, 2005

Species
- See text

= Tlalocohyla =

Genus of amphibians

Tlalocohyla is a genus of frogs in the family Hylidae, also known as rain treefrogs or Middle American yellow-bellied treefrogs. They occur in Middle America between Mexico and Costa Rica. This genus was created in 2005 following a major revision of the Hylidae. The five species in this genus were previously placed in the genus Hyla.

== Species ==
There are five recognized species:

Binomial name and author	Common name
T. godmani (Günther, 1901)	Godman's tree frog
T. loquax (Gaige and Stuart, 1934)	mahogany tree frog
T. picta (Günther, 1901)	painted tree frog
T. smithii (Boulenger, 1902)	dwarf Mexican tree frog
T. celeste (Varela-Soto, 2022)	Tapir Valley tree frog
