= Godman's tree frog =

Conservation status
- Vulnerable (IUCN 3.1)

Scientific classification
- Kingdom: Animalia
- Phylum: Chordata
- Class: Amphibia
- Order: Anura
- Family: Hylidae
- Genus: Tlalocohyla
- Species: T. godmani

Binomial name
- Tlalocohyla godmani (Günther, 1901)

Species of amphibian

Godman's tree frog (Tlalocohyla godmani) is a species of frog in the family Hylidae endemic to Mexico, where it is found in Veracruz and adjacent areas of Puebla. Its natural habitats are subtropical or tropical moist forests and intermittent rivers. Duellman states they occur in the coastal lowlands and foothills up to elevations of about 900 meters and inhabit broad-leafed evergreen forest with a well defined dry season. Conversely, Darrel Frost states they are from montane forest. It is a gray to tan to brown frog with some low contrasting mottling or reticulations of dark spots and flecks on the back, and yellow on the legs and webbing. Maximum sizes of 38.0 mm. for males and 36.6 mm. for females have been recorded. It was named for Frederick DuCane Godman, a principal contributor to the 19th century British Biological Expedition of Mexico and Central Mexico. It is threatened by habitat loss.
