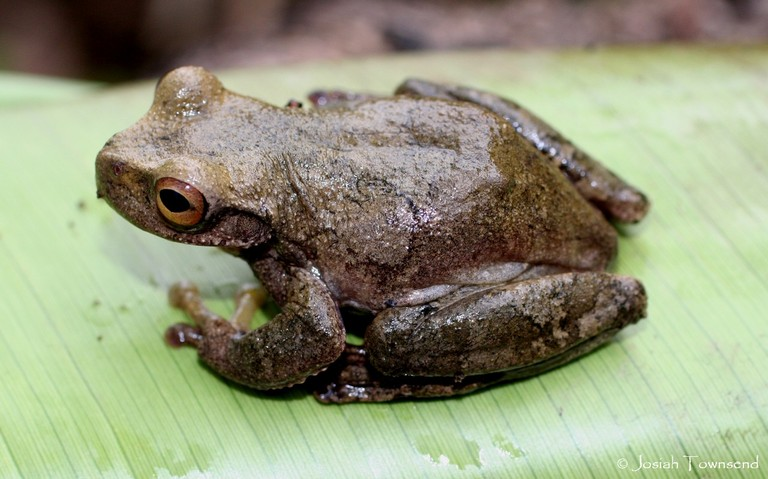

Conservation status
- Endangered (IUCN 3.1)

Scientific classification
- Kingdom: Animalia
- Phylum: Chordata
- Class: Amphibia
- Order: Anura
- Family: Hylidae
- Genus: Atlantihyla
- Species: A. spinipollex

Binomial name
- Atlantihyla spinipollex (K. P. Schmidt, 1936)

Synonyms
- Hyla spinipollex K. P. Schmidt, 1936; Ptychohyla spinipollex (K. P. Schmidt, 1936); Ptychohyla merazi Wilson and McCranie, 1989

= Ceiba stream frog =

Species of amphibian

The Ceiba stream frog (Atlantihyla spinipollex) is a species of frog in the family Hylidae endemic to Honduras. Its natural habitats are subtropical or tropical moist lowland forests, subtropical or tropical moist montane forests, and rivers. It is threatened by habitat loss.

In 2020, a population of frogs believed to be the Ceiba stream frog was described as a new species, Atlantihyla melissa. This new species is a sister species to the Ceiba stream frog.
