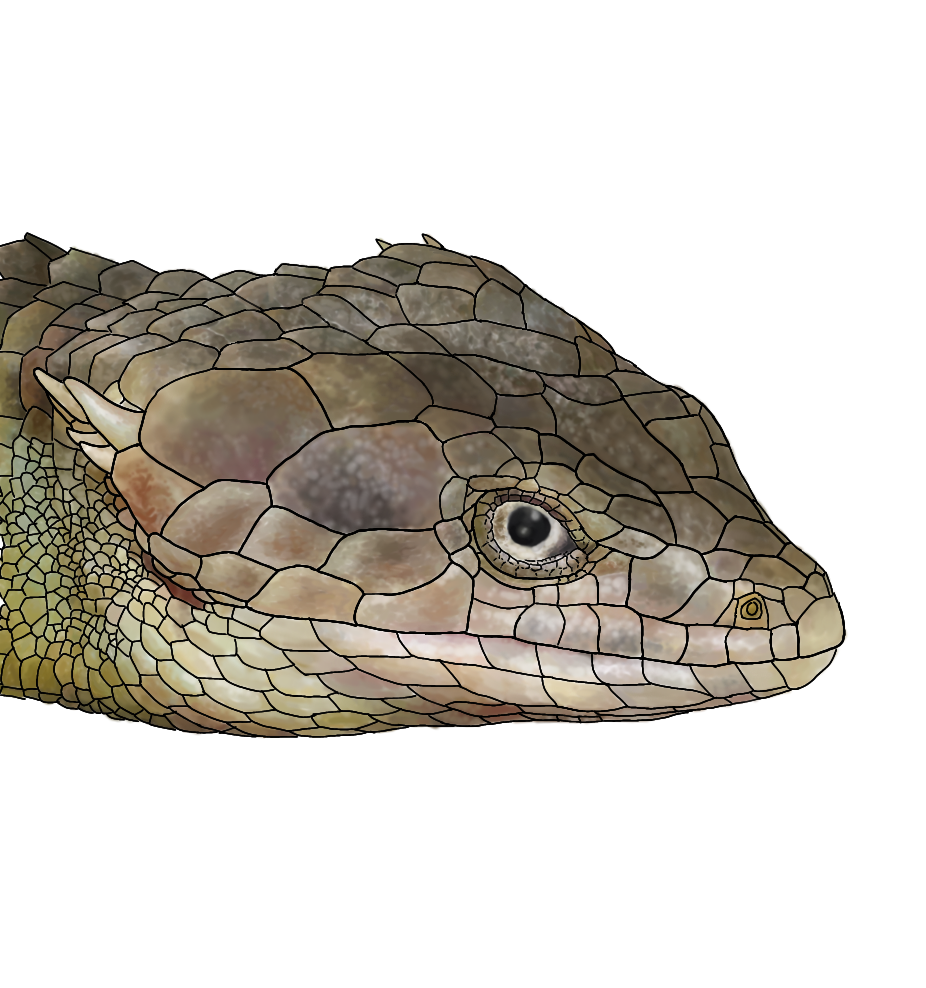

Conservation status
- Endangered (IUCN 3.1)
- CITES Appendix II

Scientific classification
- Kingdom: Animalia
- Phylum: Chordata
- Class: Reptilia
- Order: Squamata
- Suborder: Anguimorpha
- Family: Anguidae
- Genus: Abronia
- Species: A. gaiophantasma

Binomial name
- Abronia gaiophantasma Campbell & Frost, 1993

= Brilliant arboreal alligator lizard =

Species of lizard

The brilliant arboreal alligator lizard (Abronia gaiophantasma) is a species of lizard endemic to Guatemala.

== Habitat and Distribution ==
This species is restricted to the mountains of east-central Guatemala, from the Sierra de las Minas east to the Chilascó region. It occurs at elevations of 1,600–2,650 m, and can be found in pine–oak and cloud forests of lower montane wet forests. Its extent of occurrence is estimated at only 750 km^{2}, and has been declared endangered.

== Threats ==
Threats to this species include habitat loss from agriculture, and the exportation of ornamental Chamaedaphne calyculata plants, conversion of habitats to pine plantations, and intentional fires. It can be found in protected areas such as Mario Dary Rivera Protected Biotope and Sierra de las Minas Biosphere Reserve.

== Description ==
Adult Abronia Gaiophantasma are tan, brown, gray brown, or reddish brown, while young one have dark brown crossbands. Some unique features of this species are that it has 12 dorsal longitudinal scale rows, 28-30 dorsal transverse scale rows, 14-15 ventral longitudinal rows, small surprisal, discrete canthals, single or divided post-mental, and a temporal scale arrangement compared to other abronia species in Central America. [3]

== Reproduction ==
Like other members of the genus abronia, A. Gaiophantasma is Viviparous lizard, giving bith to live young. Lizard reproduction indicates that viviparous, arboreal species tend to have low fecundity and slow reproductive rates. [3,7]
