= Mountain snake =

There are two genera of snake named mountain snake:

- Plagiopholis
- Rhadinophanes, a monotypic genus with its sole representative, the graceful mountain snake, Rhadinophanes monticola
