= Nototriton major =

Conservation status
- Endangered (IUCN 3.1)

Scientific classification
- Kingdom: Animalia
- Phylum: Chordata
- Class: Amphibia
- Order: Urodela
- Family: Plethodontidae
- Genus: Nototriton
- Species: N. major

Binomial name
- Nototriton major Good & Wake, 1993

Species of amphibian

Nototriton major is a species of salamander in the family Plethodontidae. It is also called the Plantanillo Gorge salamander. It is endemic to the Cordillera de Talamanca, Costa Rica.

Its natural habitat is tropical moist montane forests. It is threatened by habitat loss.
