= Frost's arboreal alligator lizard =

Conservation status
- Critically Endangered (IUCN 3.1)
- CITES Appendix I

Scientific classification
- Kingdom: Animalia
- Phylum: Chordata
- Class: Reptilia
- Order: Squamata
- Suborder: Anguimorpha
- Family: Anguidae
- Genus: Abronia
- Species: A. frosti

Binomial name
- Abronia frosti Campbell, Sasa, M. Acevedo & Mendelson, 1998

Species of lizard

Frost's arboreal alligator lizard (Abronia frosti) is a species of lizard in the family Anguidae. The species is endemic to Guatemala in Central America.

== Etymology ==
The specific name, frosti, is in honor of American herpetologist Darrell R. Frost.

== Geographic range ==
A. frosti is found in one isolated location in Huehuetenango Department, Guatemala.

== Habitat ==
The preferred natural habitat of A. frosti, is forest, an altitudes of 2,800–2,900 m (9,200–9,500 ft).

== Description ==
A. frosti can be distinguished from all other Guatemalan species of Abronia by its lack of protuberant supra-aurical spines.

== Reproduction ==
A. frosti is ovoviviparous.
