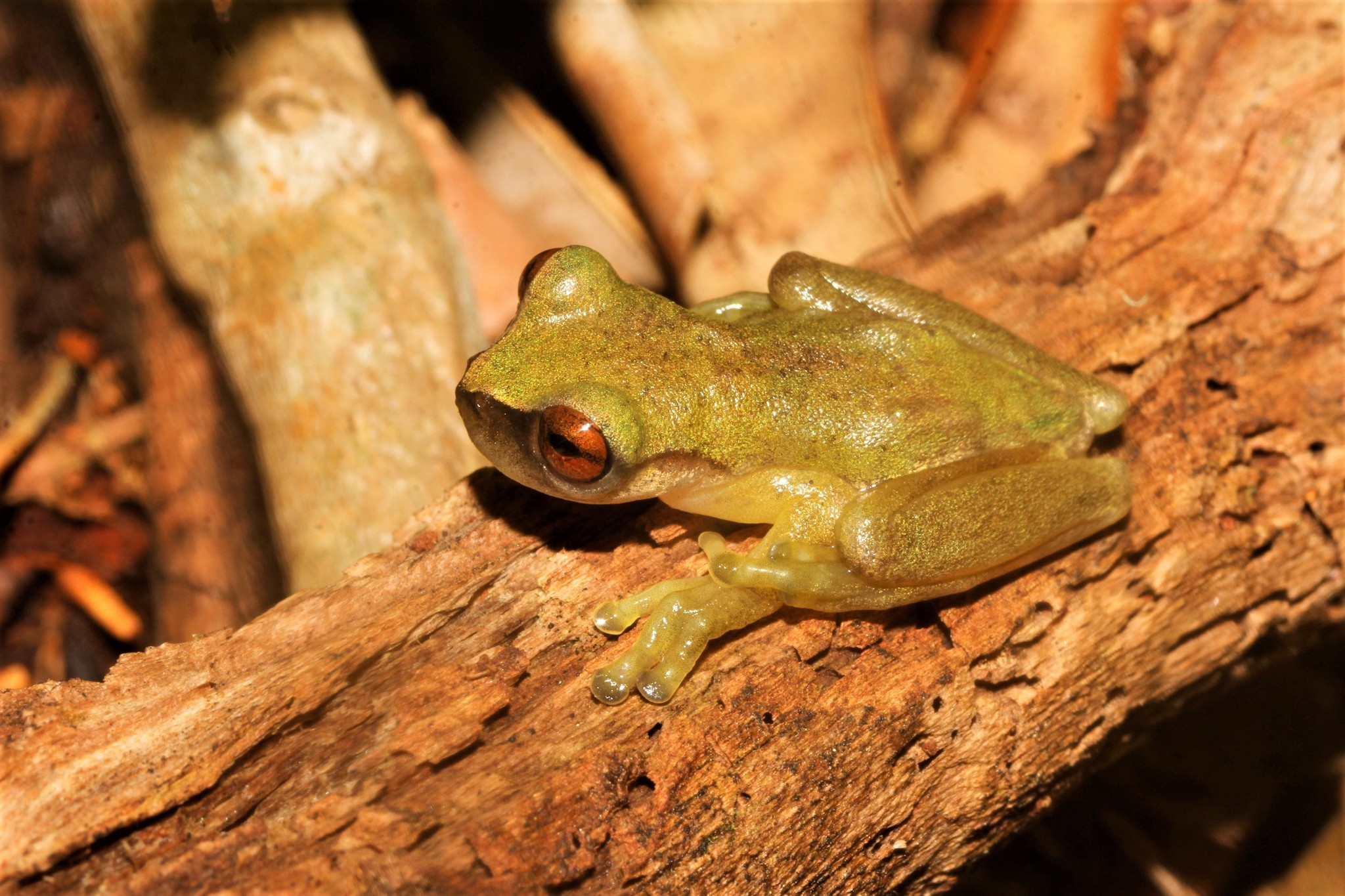

Conservation status
- Near Threatened (IUCN 3.1)

Scientific classification
- Kingdom: Animalia
- Phylum: Chordata
- Class: Amphibia
- Order: Anura
- Family: Hylidae
- Genus: Exerodonta
- Species: E. abdivita

Binomial name
- Exerodonta abdivita (Campbell & Duellman, 2000)

= Exerodonta abdivita =

Species of amphibian

Exerodonta abdivita is a species of frogs in the family Hylidae.

It is endemic to Mexico.

Its natural habitats are subtropical or tropical moist lowland forests, rivers, freshwater marshes, and intermittent freshwater marshes. It is threatened by habitat loss.
