= Nototriton picadoi =

Conservation status
- Least Concern (IUCN 3.1)

Scientific classification
- Kingdom: Animalia
- Phylum: Chordata
- Class: Amphibia
- Order: Urodela
- Family: Plethodontidae
- Genus: Nototriton
- Species: N. picadoi

Binomial name
- Nototriton picadoi (Stejneger, 1911)

Species of amphibian

Nototriton picadoi, commonly known as La Estrella salamander is a species of salamander in the family Plethodontidae. It is endemic to the Cordillera de Talamanca, Costa Rica.

Its natural habitat is tropical moist montane forests. It is threatened by habitat loss.
