= Exerodonta perkinsi =

Conservation status
- Endangered (IUCN 3.1)

Scientific classification
- Kingdom: Animalia
- Phylum: Chordata
- Class: Amphibia
- Order: Anura
- Family: Hylidae
- Genus: Exerodonta
- Species: E. perkinsi

Binomial name
- Exerodonta perkinsi (Campbell & Brodie, 1992)

Species of frog

Exerodonta perkinsi is a species of frog in the family Hylidae otherwise known as the Perkins' tree frog. It is endemic to Guatemala. Its natural habitats are subtropical or tropical moist montane forests, rivers, intermittent freshwater marshes, and heavily degraded former forest. It is threatened by habitat loss.
