= Exerodonta chimalapa =

Conservation status
- Endangered (IUCN 3.1)

Scientific classification
- Kingdom: Animalia
- Phylum: Chordata
- Class: Amphibia
- Order: Anura
- Family: Hylidae
- Genus: Exerodonta
- Species: E. chimalapa

Binomial name
- Exerodonta chimalapa (Mendelson & Campbell, 1994)

Species of frog

Exerodonta chimalapa is a species of frog in the family Hylidae. It is endemic to Mexico. Its natural habitats are temperate forests, subtropical or tropical moist montane forests, and rivers. It is threatened by habitat loss.
