= Nototriton guanacaste =

Conservation status
- Least Concern (IUCN 3.1)

Scientific classification
- Kingdom: Animalia
- Phylum: Chordata
- Class: Amphibia
- Order: Urodela
- Family: Plethodontidae
- Genus: Nototriton
- Species: N. guanacaste

Binomial name
- Nototriton guanacaste Good & Wake, 1993

Species of salamander

Nototriton guanacaste also called the Volcan Cacao moss salamander is a species of salamander in the family Plethodontidae. It is endemic to the Cordillera de Guanacaste, Costa Rica.

Its natural habitat is tropical moist montane forests.
