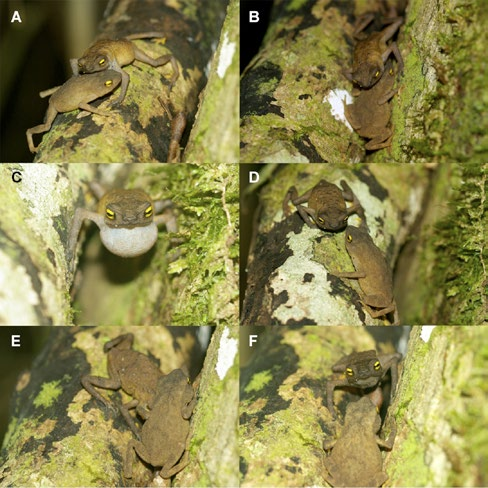
- Frostius pernambucensis males

Scientific classification
- Kingdom: Animalia
- Phylum: Chordata
- Class: Amphibia
- Order: Anura
- Family: Bufonidae
- Genus: Frostius; Cannatella, 1986

Type species
- Atelopus pernambucensis Bokermann, 1962

Species
- 2 species (see text)

= Frostius =

Genus of amphibians

Frostius – known as Frost's toads – is a small genus of true toads consisting of only two species endemic to Brazil. The genus was proposed by David C. Cannatella in 1986 based on an analysis of a species previously classified as Atelopus. Various morphological and life-history information first suggested that it is sister taxon to Atelopus or Atelopus + Osornophryne, but later molecular evidence suggests that it is sister taxon to Oreophrynella. It was named for Darrel Frost in recognition of his work on anuran systematics.

== Species ==
There are only two species in this genus:

Binomial name and author	Common name
Frostius erythrophthalmus Pimenta & Caramaschi, 2007
Frostius pernambucensis (Bokermann, 1962)	Frost's toad
