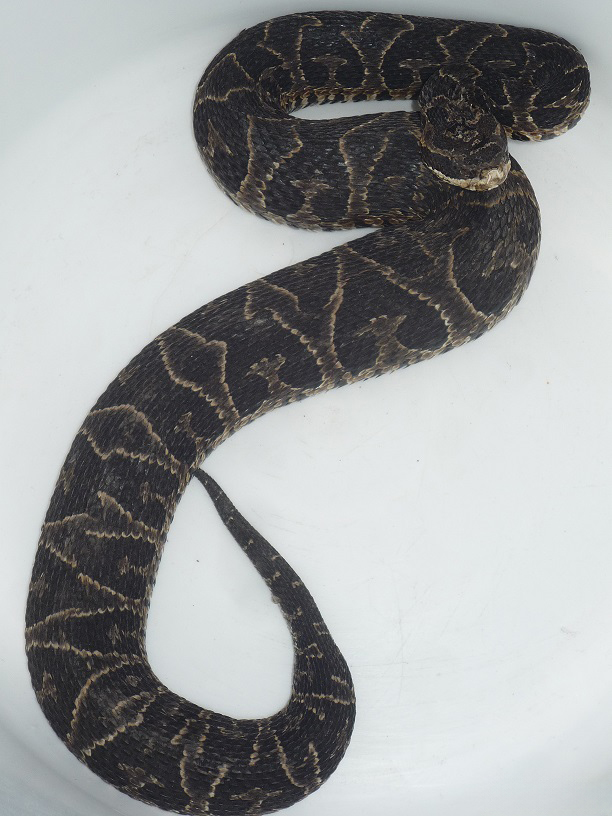

Conservation status
- Data Deficient (IUCN 3.1)

Scientific classification
- Kingdom: Animalia
- Phylum: Chordata
- Class: Reptilia
- Order: Squamata
- Suborder: Serpentes
- Family: Viperidae
- Genus: Bothrops
- Species: B. jonathani

Binomial name
- Bothrops jonathani Harvey, 1994

Synonyms
- Rhinocerophis jonathani (Harvey, 1994)

= Bothrops jonathani =

Species of snake

Bothrops jonathani, Jonathan's lancehead, is a species of snake belonging to the family Viperidae, the vipers. This species is found in southern South America.

== Taxonomy ==
Bothrops jonanthani was first formally described in 1994 by the American herpetologist Michael Brown Harvey with its type locality given as roughly 35km north of El Empalme on Highway 4 in Carrasco Province, Cochabamba Department, form an elevation of around 2,800 m (9,200 ft) at 7° 45'S, 65°00'W, Bolivia. This species is classified in the genus Bothrops which is classified within the subfamily Crotalinae, the pit-vipers within the viper family Viperidae.

== Etymology ==
Bothrops jonathani is classified within the genus Bothrops, a name which is derived from the Greek bothros, which means "pit", a reference to the heat-sensing pits located between the eyes and the nostrils of these snakes. The specific name honours Jonathan A. Campbell, the American herpetologist, for his contribution to the study of Neotropical pitvipers.

== Description ==
Bothrops jonathani has a maximum know svl of 800 mm (31 in). It has a complex facial pattern which is made up of a wide, black edged, dark brown bands with white and tan stripes between them. The ventral scales have a white ground colour patterned with grey becoming greyer towards the grey undertail. The dorsal pattern has a tan ground colour with large cream blotches on the back and smaller brown blotches on the sides, these blotches vary in shape and between individuals.

== Distribution and habitat ==
Bothrops jonathani is found at altitudes between 1,600 and 3,500 m (5,200 and 11,500 ft) along the eastern edge of the Altiplano in the Bolivian departments of Cochabamba, Santa Cruz, Tarija and probably Chuquisaca and in the Argentine provinces of Jujuy and Salta. It is found among tall grass, shrubs and cacti, typically on steep rocky slopes.
