= Nototriton tapanti =

Conservation status
- Least Concern (IUCN 3.1)

Scientific classification
- Kingdom: Animalia
- Phylum: Chordata
- Class: Amphibia
- Order: Urodela
- Family: Plethodontidae
- Genus: Nototriton
- Species: N. tapanti

Binomial name
- Nototriton tapanti Good & Wake, 1993

Species of amphibian

Nototriton tapanti, commonly known as the Tapanti moss salamander, is a species of salamander in the family Plethodontidae. It is endemic to the Cordillera de Talamanca, Costa Rica.

Its natural habitat is tropical moist montane forests. It is threatened by habitat loss.
