= Quilticohyla zoque =

Conservation status
- Endangered (IUCN 3.1)

Scientific classification
- Kingdom: Animalia
- Phylum: Chordata
- Class: Amphibia
- Order: Anura
- Family: Hylidae
- Genus: Quilticohyla
- Species: Q. zoque

Binomial name
- Quilticohyla zoque (Canseco-Márquez, Aguilar-López, Luría-Manzano, Pineda-Arredondo, and Caviedes-Solis, 2017)

Synonyms
- Ptychohyla zoque Canseco-Márquez, Aguilar-López, Luría-Manzano, Pineda-Arredondo, and Caviedes-Solis, 2017

Species of frog

Quilticohyla zoque, the Zoque tree frog, is a frog. It is endemic to Mexico, where it has been observed in evergreen tropical forests between 76 and 600 meters above sea level.

The iris of the frog's eye is pale pink.
