= Quilticohyla =

Scientific classification
- Kingdom: Animalia
- Phylum: Chordata
- Class: Amphibia
- Order: Anura
- Family: Hylidae
- Subfamily: Hylinae
- Genus: Quilticohyla; Faivovich et al., 2018

Species
- Q. acrochorda; Q. erythromma; Q. sanctaecrucis; Q. zoque

Genus of amphibians

Quilticohyla is a genus of frogs in the family Hylidae. They are native to southern Mexico and eastern Guatemala. All species in this genus are endangered or critically endangered.

Members of this genus were formerly classified in the genus Ptychohyla, but the new genus Quilticohyla was coined for them in 2018 after this classification was found to be paraphyletic. The genus name originates from the Nahuatl word quiltic, meaning "green", which refers to the green coloration of these frogs. Quilticohyla is thought to be the sister genus to Bromeliohyla.

The genus has 4 recognized species:

Binomial name and author	Common name
Quilticohyla acrochorda (Campbell and Duellman, 2000)	warty mountain stream frog
Quilticohyla erythromma (Taylor, 1937)	Guerreran stream frog
Quilticohyla sanctaecrucis (Campbell and Smith, 1992)	Chinamococh stream frog
Quilticohyla zoque (Canseco-Márquez, Aguilar-López, Luría-Manzano, Pineda-Arredondo, and Caviedes-Solis, 2017)	Zoque treefrog
