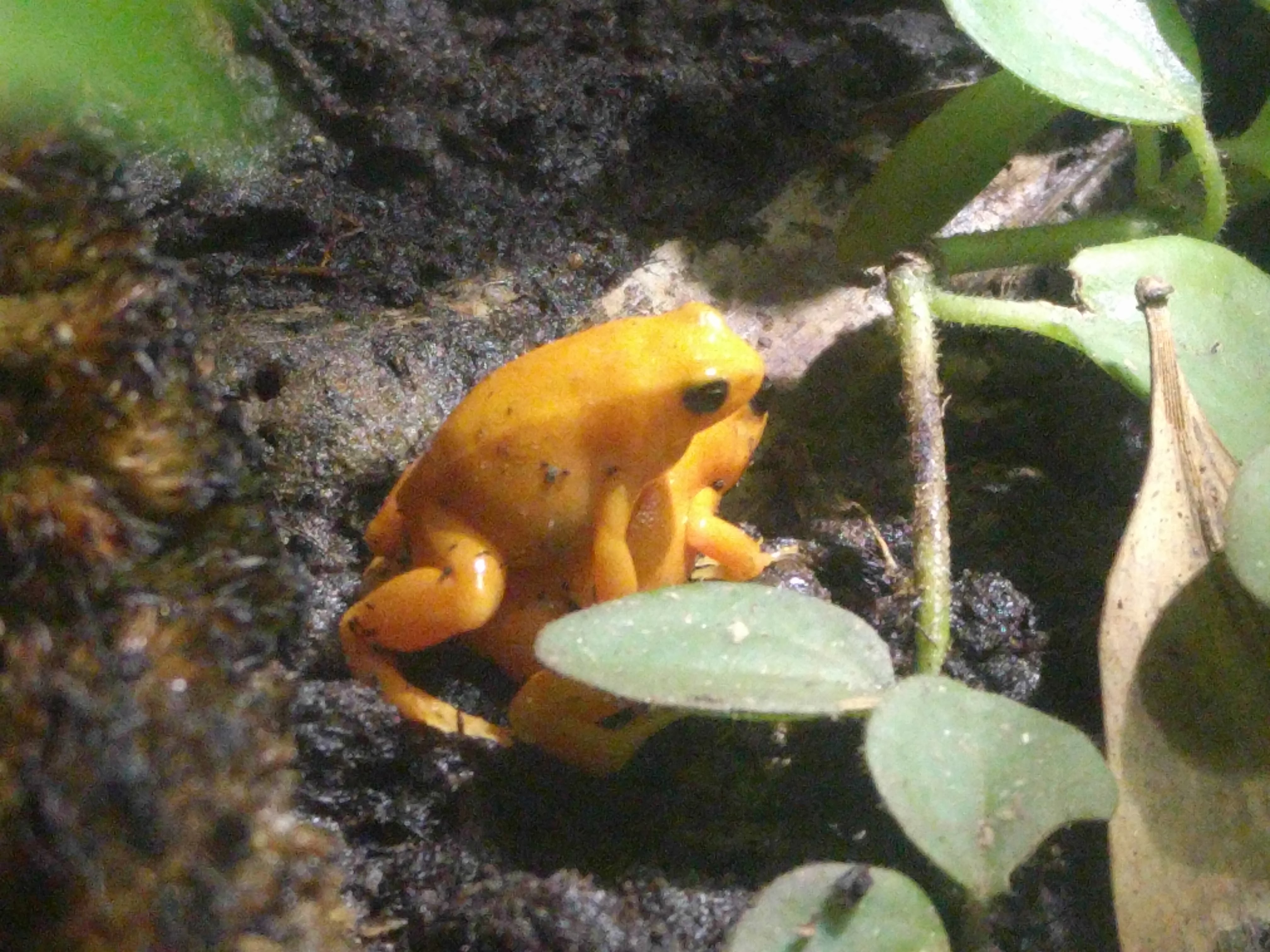

Conservation status
- Least Concern (IUCN 3.1)

Scientific classification
- Kingdom: Animalia
- Phylum: Chordata
- Class: Amphibia
- Order: Anura
- Family: Hylidae
- Genus: Tlalocohyla
- Species: T. smithii

Binomial name
- Tlalocohyla smithii (Boulenger, 1901)

= Dwarf Mexican tree frog =

Species of amphibian

The dwarf Mexican tree frog (Tlalocohyla smithii) is a species of frog in the family Hylidae endemic to Mexico.

== Habitat and distribution ==
Its natural habitats are subtropical or tropical dry forests, intermittent rivers, and intermittent freshwater marshes.

It ranges from central Sinaloa southwards along the Pacific lowlands to southern Oaxaca, and inland in the Balsas-Tepalcatepec Basin Guerrero, Morelos, and Puebla states. It is found at elevations from sea level to 1,332 meters.

== Conservation ==
It is threatened by habitat loss. The frog's distribution is caused by abiotic and biotic factors as well as the availability of resources and characteristics of reproductive sites.
