= Exerodonta melanomma =

Conservation status
- Vulnerable (IUCN 3.1)

Scientific classification
- Kingdom: Animalia
- Phylum: Chordata
- Class: Amphibia
- Order: Anura
- Family: Hylidae
- Genus: Exerodonta
- Species: E. melanomma

Binomial name
- Exerodonta melanomma (Taylor, 1940)

Species of frog

Exerodonta melanomma is a species of frog in the family Hylidae. It is endemic to Mexico. Its natural habitats are subtropical or tropical moist montane forests, rivers, and intermittent rivers. It is threatened by habitat loss.
