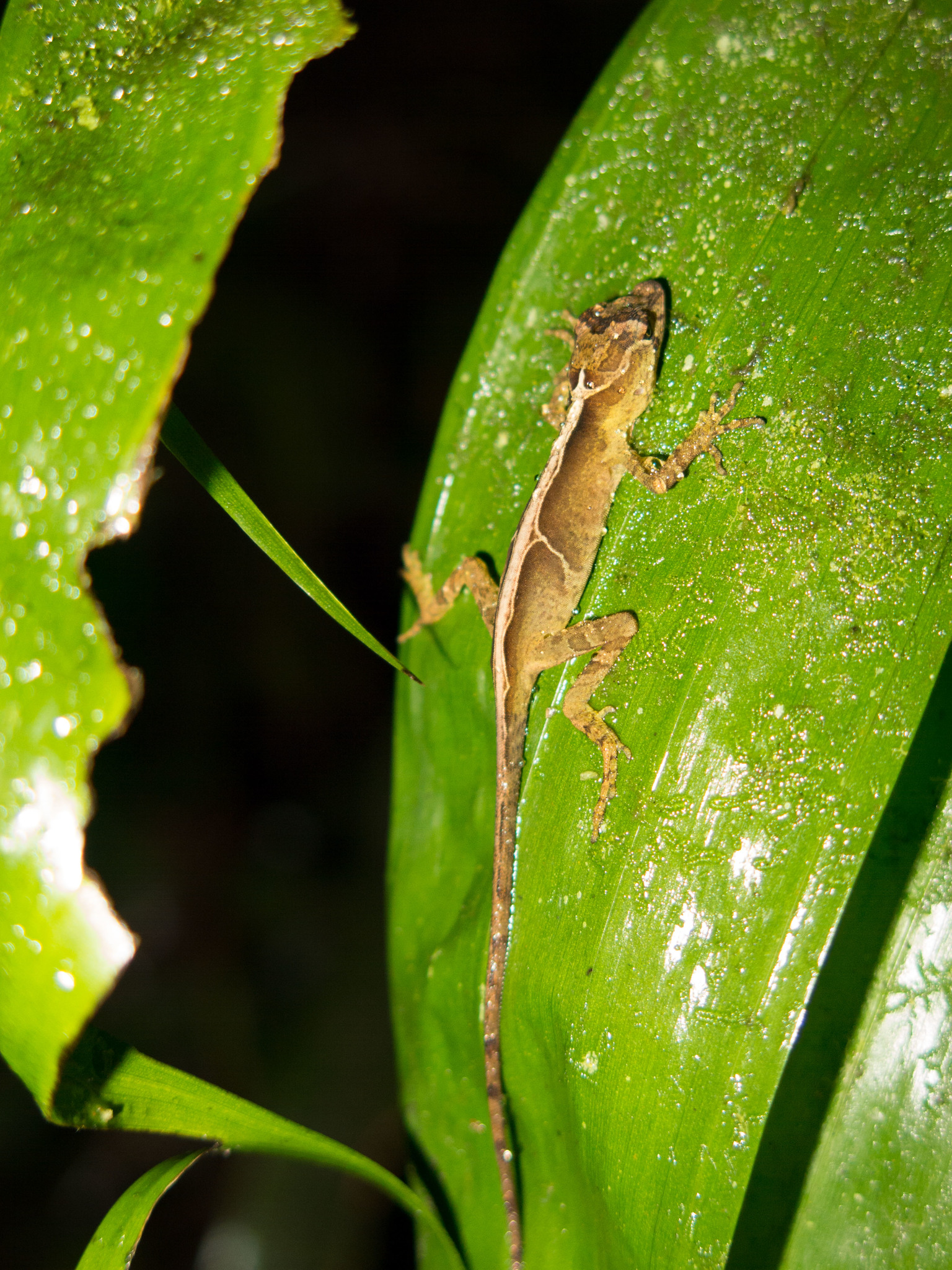

Conservation status
- Vulnerable (IUCN 3.1)

Scientific classification
- Kingdom: Animalia
- Phylum: Chordata
- Class: Reptilia
- Order: Squamata
- Suborder: Iguania
- Family: Dactyloidae
- Genus: Anolis
- Species: A. naufragus

Binomial name
- Anolis naufragus (Campbell, Hillis, & Lamar, 1989)

= Anolis naufragus =

Species of lizard

Anolis naufragus, the Hidalgo anole, is a species of lizard in the family of Dactyloidae. The species is found in Mexico.
