= Crotalus tancitarensis =

Conservation status
- Data Deficient (IUCN 3.1)

Scientific classification
- Kingdom: Animalia
- Phylum: Chordata
- Class: Reptilia
- Order: Squamata
- Suborder: Serpentes
- Family: Viperidae
- Genus: Crotalus
- Species: C. tancitarensis

Binomial name
- Crotalus tancitarensis Alvarado-Díaz & Campbell, 2004
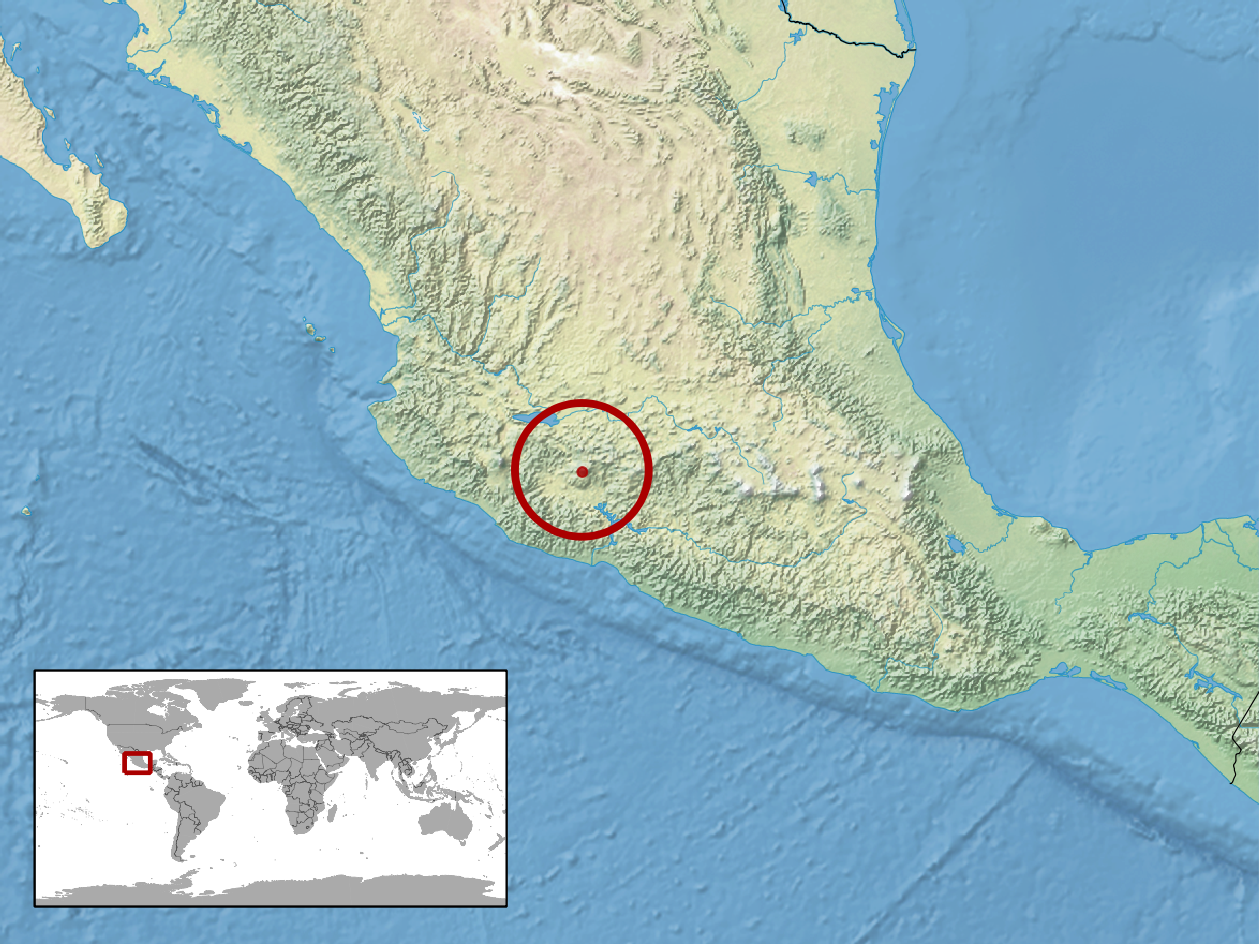

Species of snake

Crotalus tancitarensis, commonly known as the Tancitaro rattlesnake, is a species of venomous snake of the family Viperidae.

== Geographic range ==
The snake is endemic to the state of Michoacán in southwestern Mexico.
