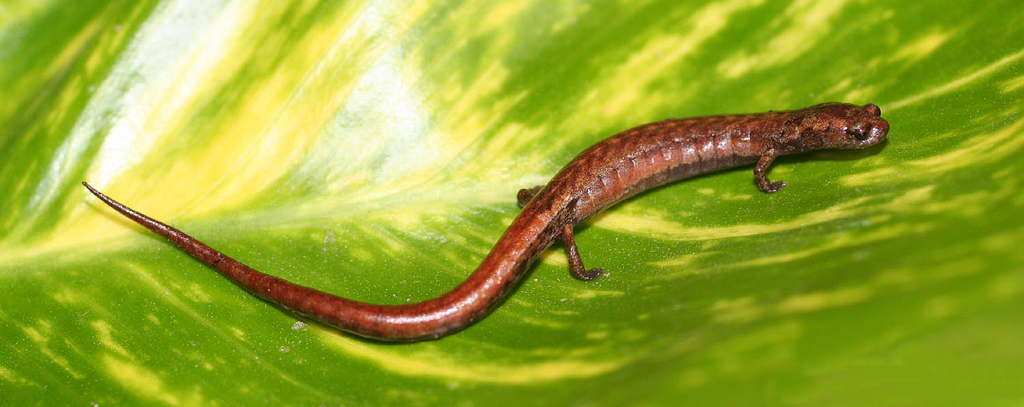
- Nototriton lignicola

Scientific classification
- Kingdom: Animalia
- Phylum: Chordata
- Class: Amphibia
- Order: Urodela
- Family: Plethodontidae
- Subfamily: Hemidactyliinae
- Genus: Nototriton; Wake & Elias, 1983

Species
- See table.

= Nototriton =

Genus of salamanders

Nototriton, commonly referred to as moss salamanders is a genus in the salamander family Plethodontidae, which is characterized by their absence of lungs; they instead achieve respiration through their skin and the tissues lining their mouth. They range from Central Costa Rica to north-central and western Honduras reaching also to eastern Guatemala.

== Species ==
The genus contains the following 20 species:

Binomial Name and Author	Common name
Nototriton abscondens (Taylor, 1948)	Isla Bonita moss salamander
Nototriton barbouri (Schmidt, 1936)	Yoro salamander
Nototriton brodiei Campbell & Smith, 1998	Cerro Pozo de Agua moss salamander
Nototriton costaricense Arias and Kubicki, 2018
Nototriton gamezi García-París & Wake, 2000	Monteverde moss salamander
Nototriton guanacaste Good & Wake, 1993	Volcan Cacao moss salamander
Nototriton lignicola McCranie & Wilson, 1997	Cerro de Emmedio moss salamander
Nototriton limnospectator McCranie, Wilson & Polisar, 1998	Santa Barbara moss salamander
Nototriton major Good & Wake, 1993	Plantanillo gorge salamander
Nototriton matama Boza-Oviedo, Rovito, Chaves, García-Rodríguez, Artavia, Bolaños, and Wake, 2012
Nototriton mime Townsend, Medina-Flores, Reyes-Calderón, and Austin, 2013
Nototriton nelsoni Townsend, 2016
Nototriton oreadorum Townsend, 2016
Nototriton picadoi (Stejneger, 1911)	La Estrella salamander
Nototriton picucha Townsend, Medina-Flores, Murillo, and Austin, 2011
Nototriton richardi (Taylor, 1949)	Richard's moss salamander
Nototriton saslaya Köhler, 2002	Cerro Saslaya moss salamander
Nototriton stuarti Wake & Campbell, 2000	Stuart's moss salamander
Nototriton tapanti Good & Wake, 1993	Tapanti moss salamander
Nototriton tomamorum Townsend, 2010	Stuart's moss salamander
