= Exerodonta bivocata =

Conservation status
- Endangered (IUCN 3.1)

Scientific classification
- Kingdom: Animalia
- Phylum: Chordata
- Class: Amphibia
- Order: Anura
- Family: Hylidae
- Genus: Exerodonta
- Species: E. bivocata

Binomial name
- Exerodonta bivocata (Duellman & Hoyt, 1961)

Species of frog

Exerodonta bivocata is a species of frog in the family Hylidae. It is endemic to Mexico. Its natural habitats are subtropical or tropical moist montane forests and rivers. It is threatened by habitat loss.
