= Bolitoglossa psephena =

Conservation status
- Data Deficient (IUCN 3.1)

Scientific classification
- Domain: Eukaryota
- Kingdom: Animalia
- Phylum: Chordata
- Class: Amphibia
- Order: Urodela
- Family: Plethodontidae
- Genus: Bolitoglossa
- Species: B. psephena

Binomial name
- Bolitoglossa psephena Campbell, Smith, Streicher, Acevedo, and Brodie, 2010
- Bolitoglossa psephena is only known from near Chimaltenango, Guatemala

Species of amphibian

Bolitoglossa psephena is a lungless salamander in the family Plethodontidae. It is endemic to Guatemala and only known from its type locality, Finca Santa Elena near Chimaltenango. The specific name is derived from the Greek psephena, meaning dark or obscure, and refers to the uniformly dark coloration of this small salamander.

== Description ==
The holotype is a female that measures 72 mm (2.8 in) in snout–vent length. Tail length is 52 mm (2.0 in). The snout is rounded in dorsal profile. The dorsum is uniformly dark in preservative and medium brown, with a faint trace of paler brown mottling on the flanks, when photographed in life. Both finger and toe tips are broad and blunt. The terminal phalanges of the fingers are free of webbing. The toe webbing extends to the base of the terminal segments.

== Habitat and conservation ==
The holotype was collected from montane wet forest at about 2,500 m (8,200 ft) above sea level. The forest is abundant with pines, cypress, firs, oaks, alders, and laurels. As of 2010, the area had good forest patches remaining. As of late 2020, this species had not been assessed for the IUCN Red List of Threatened Species.
