= Micrurus pachecogili =

Conservation status
- Data Deficient (IUCN 3.1)

Scientific classification
- Kingdom: Animalia
- Phylum: Chordata
- Class: Reptilia
- Order: Squamata
- Suborder: Serpentes
- Family: Elapidae
- Genus: Micrurus
- Species: M. pachecogili

Binomial name
- Micrurus pachecogili Campbell, 2000
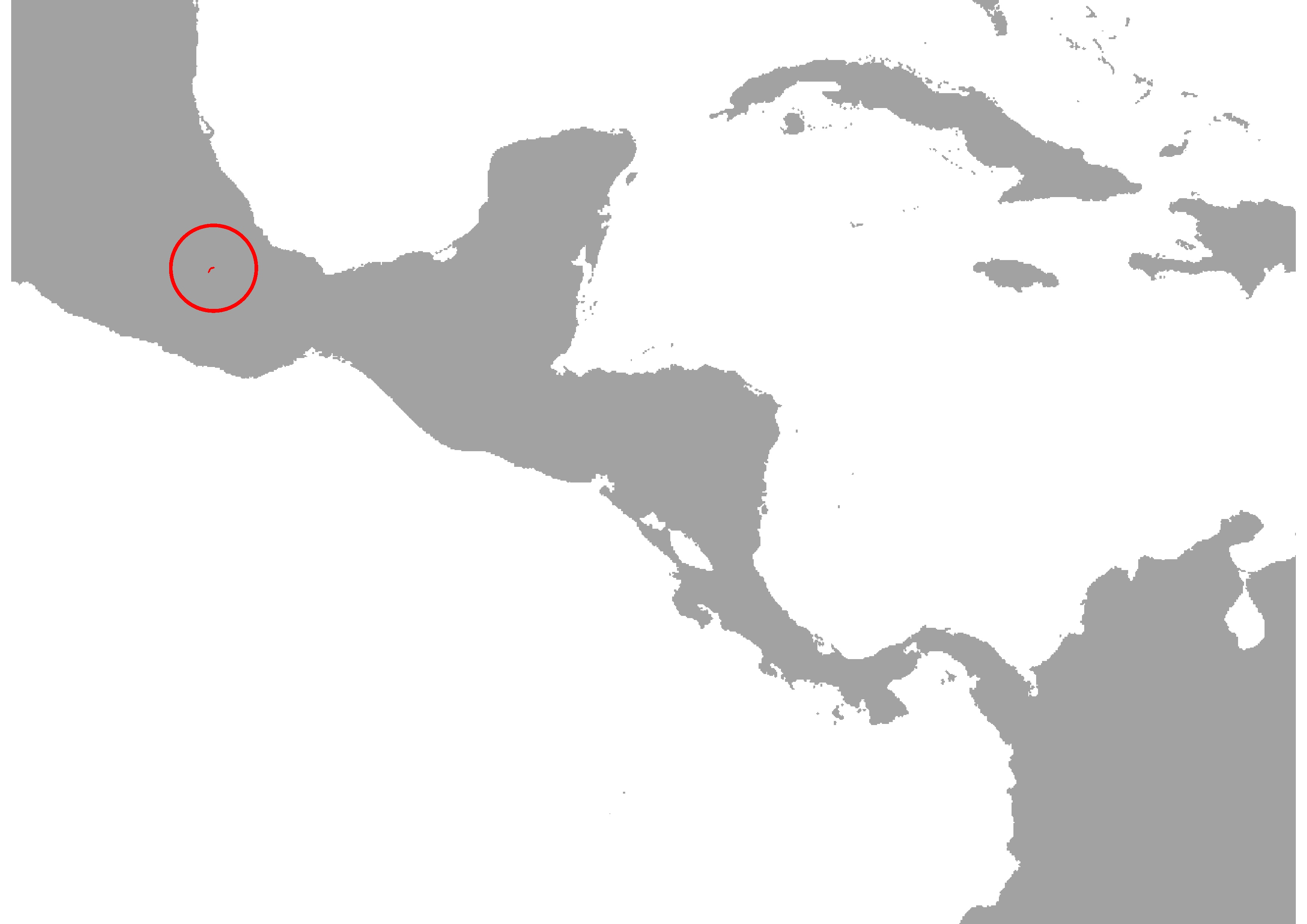

Species of snake

Micrurus pachecogili, also known commonly as the Pueblan coral snake, the Zapotitlan coral snake, and el coralillo de Puebla in Mexican Spanish, is a species of venomous snake in the family Elapidae. The species is endemic to the Mexican state of Puebla.

== Etymology ==
The specific name, pachecogili, is in honor of E. Pacheco-Gil who collected the holotype.

== Description ==
Micrurus pachecogili has a color pattern of alternating black and red rings separated by yellow rings. Compared to other coral snakes, the yellow rings are relatively wider, and the red rings are relatively narrower (Campbell 2000).

== Habitat ==
The preferred natural habitat of Micrurus pachecogili is shrubland, at elevations of approximately 1,500 m (4,900 ft).

== Behavior ==
Micrurus pachecogili is terrestrial, and it is both crepuscular and nocturnal.

== Reproduction ==
Micrurus pachecogili is oviparous.

== Taxonomy ==
Micrurus pachecogili may be a synonym of Micrurus ephippifer.
