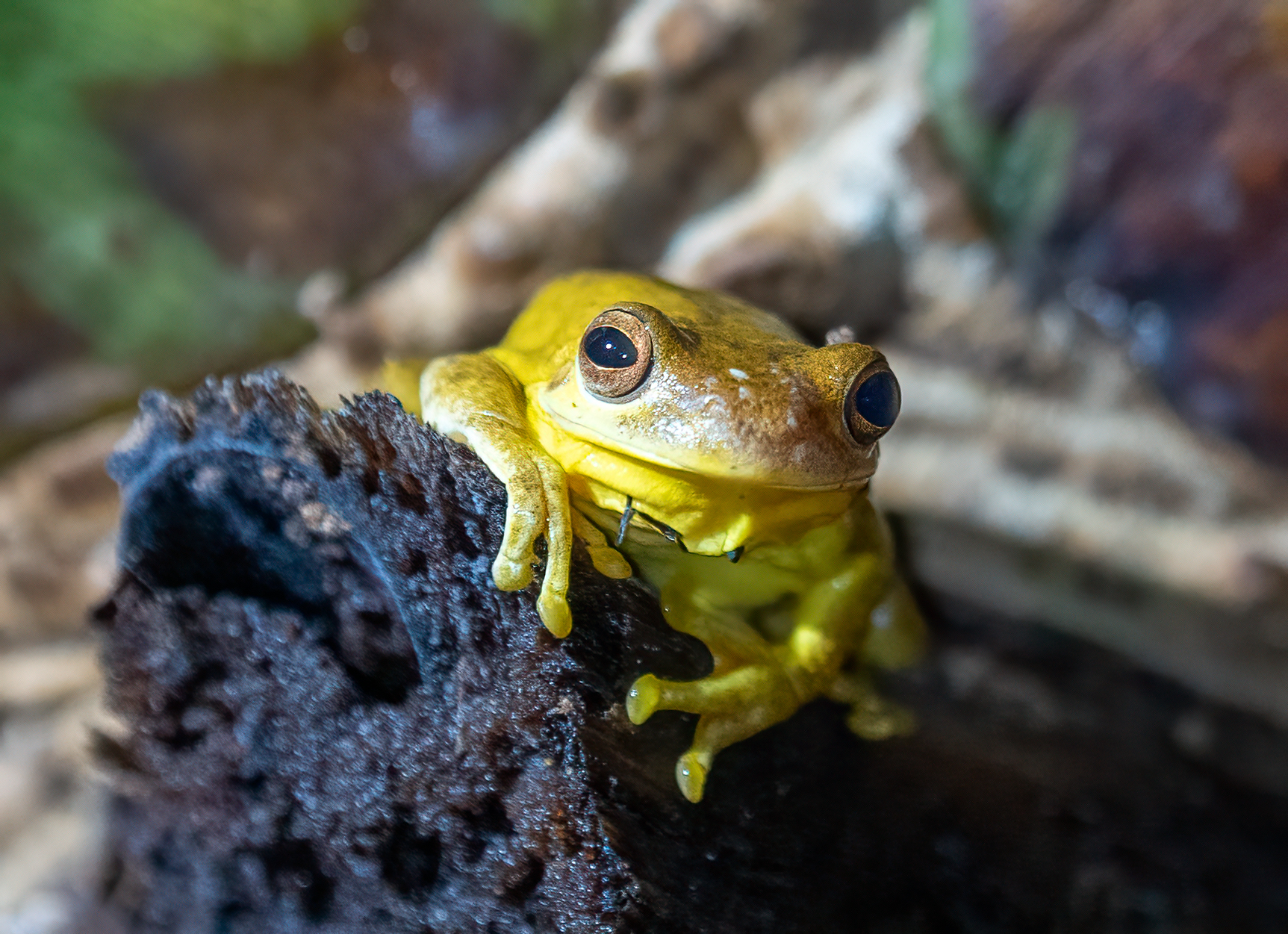

Conservation status
- Least Concern (IUCN 3.1)

Scientific classification
- Kingdom: Animalia
- Phylum: Chordata
- Class: Amphibia
- Order: Anura
- Family: Hylidae
- Genus: Tlalocohyla
- Species: T. loquax

Binomial name
- Tlalocohyla loquax (Gaige & Stuart, 1934)

Synonyms
- Hyla loquax (Gaige & Stuart, 1934)

= Mahogany tree frog =

Species of amphibian

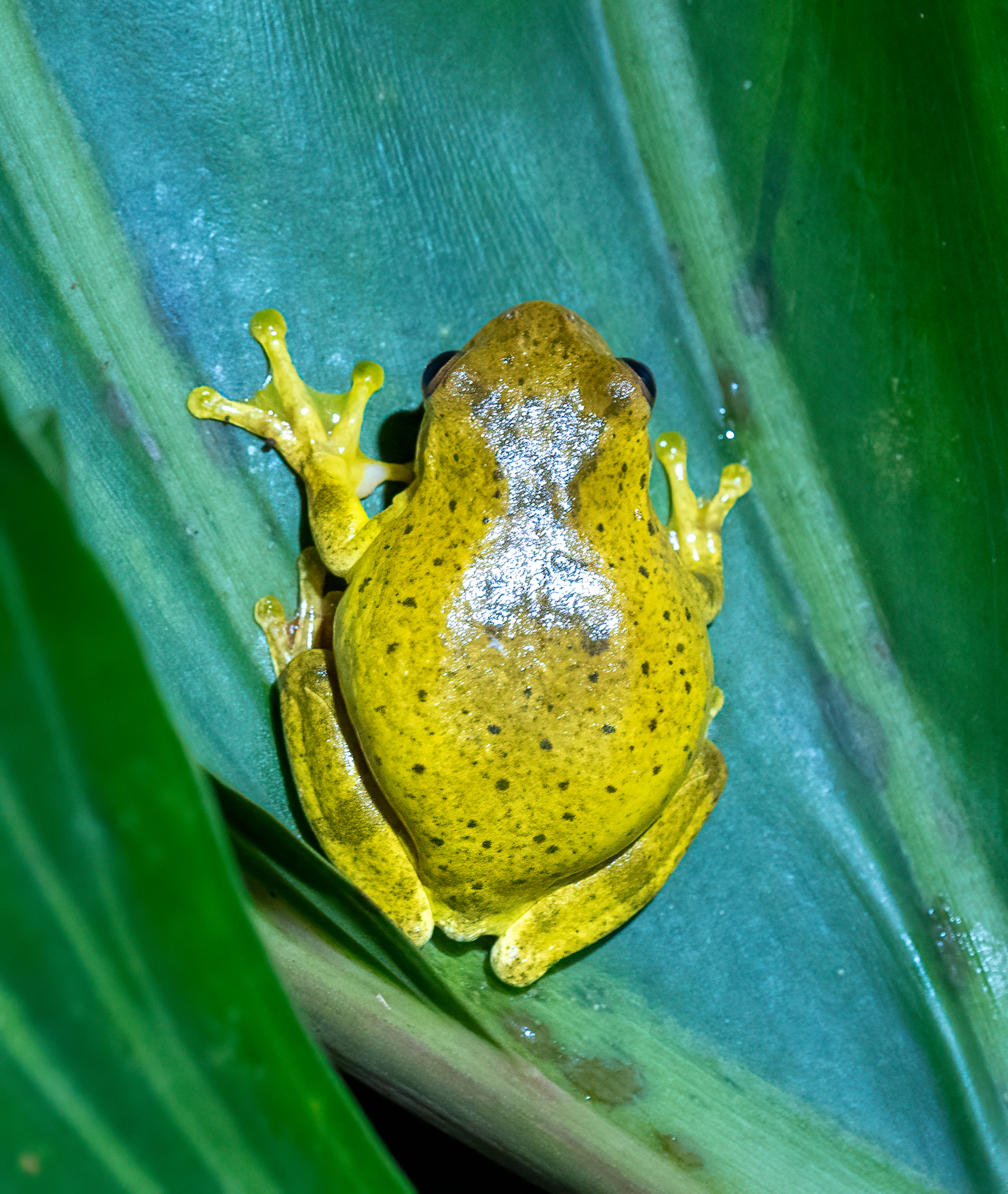
Mahogany tree frog in Alajuela Province, Costa Rica

The mahogany tree frog (Tlalocohyla loquax) is a species of frog in the family Hylidae found in Belize, Costa Rica, Guatemala, Honduras, Mexico, and Nicaragua.

Its natural habitats are subtropical or tropical moist lowland forests, subtropical or tropical moist montane forests, freshwater marshes, intermittent freshwater marshes, pastureland, rural gardens, and heavily degraded former forests. It is threatened by habitat loss.

The adult male frog measures 33 to 45 mm in snout-vent length and the adult female frog 38 to 47 mm. This frog has webbed skin on all four feet. This frog has bright yellow color on its back and some bright red near its vent and sides. This frog can change color, appearing yellow and orange at night and almost white during the day. This frog is nocturnal.

The female frog lays eggs in deep bodies of water, about 250 per clutch. The eggs adhere to surface plants. After the tadpoles hatch, they swim downward.

This frog is not in danger of dying out because it can live in many kinds of habitat so long as there is sufficient plant cover. Many of its habitats are in protected areas.
