= Nototriton saslaya =

Conservation status
- Critically Endangered (IUCN 3.1)

Scientific classification
- Kingdom: Animalia
- Phylum: Chordata
- Class: Amphibia
- Order: Urodela
- Family: Plethodontidae
- Genus: Nototriton
- Species: N. saslaya

Binomial name
- Nototriton saslaya Köhler, 2002

Species of salamander

Nototriton saslaya is a species of salamander in the family Plethodontidae. It is endemic to Nicaragua and known only from Cerro Sasalya (its eponymous type locality) and Cerro El Torro, both in the Saslaya National Park, north-central Nicaragua. Common name Saslaya moss salamander has been proposed for it.

== Description ==
Adult males, based on a single specimen, measure about 28 mm (1.1 in), and adult females measure 29–35 mm (1.1–1.4 in) in snout–vent length. The head is relatively large and clearly distinct from the trunk. The parotoid glands are well-developed and prominent. The snout is rounded. The eyes are moderately protuberant. The tail is slightly constricted at its base and tapering to a pointed tip. The limbs are slender and relatively long. The digits are well-differentiated and have some webbing. Dorsal coloration is brown with dark gray chevron markings and fine yellow-green mottling. The head is darker than the trunk. Ventral parts are brown with lighter speckling.

== Habitat and conservation ==
Nototriton saslaya occurs in lower montane forest and cloud forest at elevations of 1,280–1,500 m (4,200–4,920 ft) above sea level. It is an arboreal species often found hiding in thick moss. Development is direct (i.e., there is no free-living larval stage); therefore, its reproduction does not depend on aquatic habitats.

Nototriton saslaya is relatively common within its small known range. However, habitat loss and fragmentation are taking place within its range, and its population is suspected to be decreasing. Although its range is within a protected area, improvement management of the area would be needed.
