= Nototriton abscondens =

Conservation status
- Least Concern (IUCN 3.1)

Scientific classification
- Kingdom: Animalia
- Phylum: Chordata
- Class: Amphibia
- Order: Urodela
- Family: Plethodontidae
- Genus: Nototriton
- Species: N. abscondens

Binomial name
- Nototriton abscondens (Taylor, 1948)

Species of salamander

Nototriton abscondens is a species of salamander in the family Plethodontidae. It is endemic to Costa Rica where it is found in Cordillera de Tilarán and Cordillera Central.

Its natural habitat is tropical moist montane forests. It is threatened by habitat loss.
