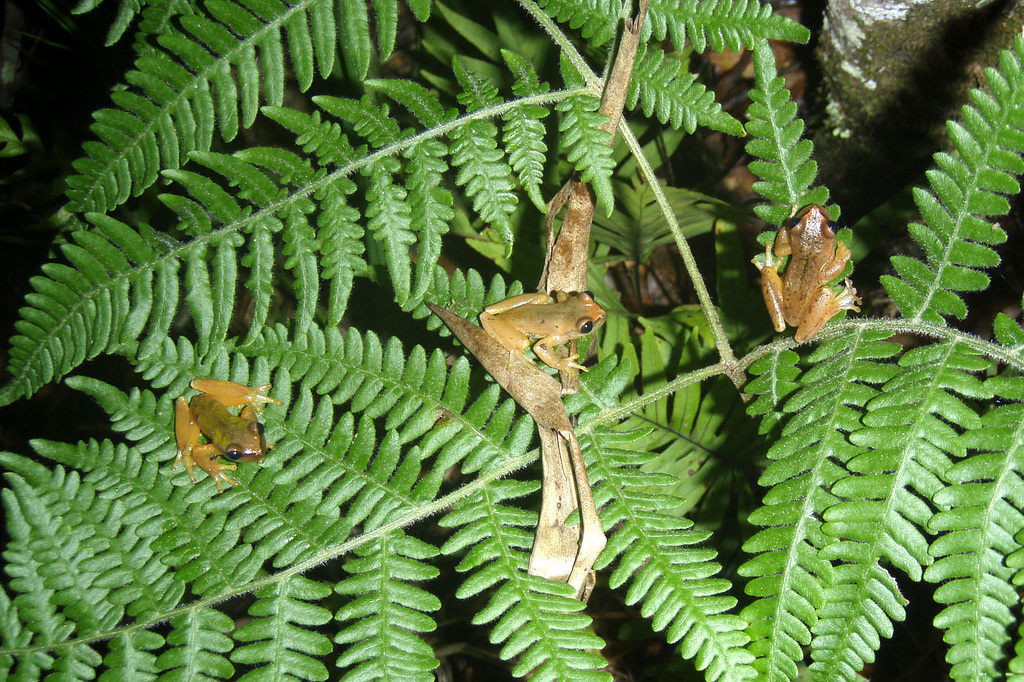

Conservation status
- Near Threatened (IUCN 3.1)

Scientific classification
- Kingdom: Animalia
- Phylum: Chordata
- Class: Amphibia
- Order: Anura
- Family: Hylidae
- Genus: Exerodonta
- Species: E. catracha

Binomial name
- Exerodonta catracha (Porras & Wilson, 1987)

= Exerodonta catracha =

Species of frog

Exerodonta catracha is a species of frog in the family Hylidae. It is endemic to Honduras. Its natural habitats are subtropical or tropical moist montane forests, rivers, and freshwater marshes. It is threatened by habitat loss.
