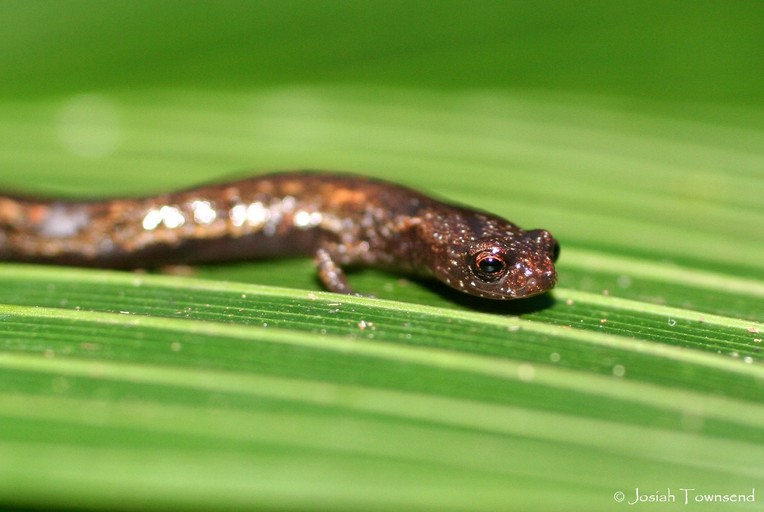

Conservation status
- Endangered (IUCN 3.1)

Scientific classification
- Kingdom: Animalia
- Phylum: Chordata
- Class: Amphibia
- Order: Urodela
- Family: Plethodontidae
- Genus: Nototriton
- Species: N. limnospectator

Binomial name
- Nototriton limnospectator McCranie, Wilson & Polisar, 1998

= Santa Barbara moss salamander =

Species of amphibian

Nototriton limnospectator is a species of salamander in the family Plethodontidae. It is also called the Santa Barbara moss salamander. It is endemic to Honduras.

== Habitat ==
The natural habitat of N. limnospectator is subtropical or tropical moist montane forests.

== Conservation status ==
N. limnospectator is threatened by habitat loss.
