= Nototriton gamezi =

Conservation status
- Least Concern (IUCN 3.1)

Scientific classification
- Kingdom: Animalia
- Phylum: Chordata
- Class: Amphibia
- Order: Urodela
- Family: Plethodontidae
- Genus: Nototriton
- Species: N. gamezi

Binomial name
- Nototriton gamezi García-París & Wake, 2000

Species of salamander

Nototriton gamezi is a species of salamander in the family Plethodontidae. It is also known as the Monteverde moss salamander.

It is endemic to Cordillera de Tilarán, Costa Rica.

Its natural habitat is tropical moist montane forests.
