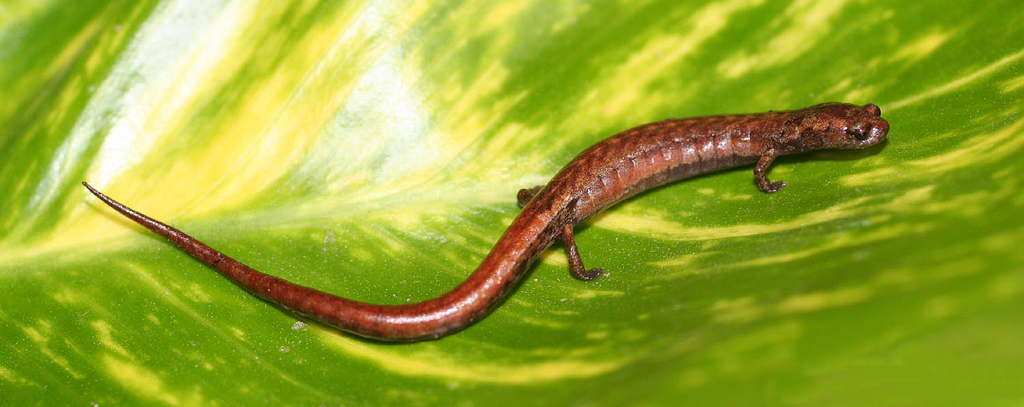

Conservation status
- Endangered (IUCN 3.1)

Scientific classification
- Kingdom: Animalia
- Phylum: Chordata
- Class: Amphibia
- Order: Urodela
- Family: Plethodontidae
- Genus: Nototriton
- Species: N. lignicola

Binomial name
- Nototriton lignicola McCranie & Wilson, 1997

= Nototriton lignicola =

Species of salamander

Nototriton lignicola is a species of salamander in the family Plethodontidae. It is also known as the Cerro de Enmedio moss salamander. It is endemic to Honduras.

Its natural habitat is subtropical or tropical moist montane forests. It is threatened by habitat loss.
