= Nototriton barbouri =

Conservation status
- Endangered (IUCN 3.1)

Scientific classification
- Kingdom: Animalia
- Phylum: Chordata
- Class: Amphibia
- Order: Urodela
- Family: Plethodontidae
- Genus: Nototriton
- Species: N. barbouri

Binomial name
- Nototriton barbouri (K. Schmidt, 1936)

Species of salamander

Nototriton barbouri is a species of salamander in the family Plethodontidae. It is endemic to Honduras.

Its natural habitats are subtropical or tropical moist lowland forests and subtropical or tropical moist montane forests. It is threatened by habitat loss.

The Nototriton barbouri is often referred to by its common name, the Yoro Moss Salamander. N. Barbouri's habitat includes packed leaf litter, rotten logs, abandoned hummingbird nests, and inside bromeliads during the daytime. At nighttime, they actively forage on the branches of small trees and shrubs (J. Townsend, 2016).

== Sources ==
- Cruz, G., Wilson, L.D. & McCranie, R. 2004. Nototriton barbouri. 2006 IUCN Red List of Threatened Species. Downloaded on 23 July 2007.
- Townsend, J.H., (2016). Taxonomic revision of the moss salamander Nototriton barbouri (Schmidt) (Caudata:Plethodontidae), with description of two new species from the Cordillera Nombre de Dios, Honduras. Zootaxa 4196 (4): 511–528.
