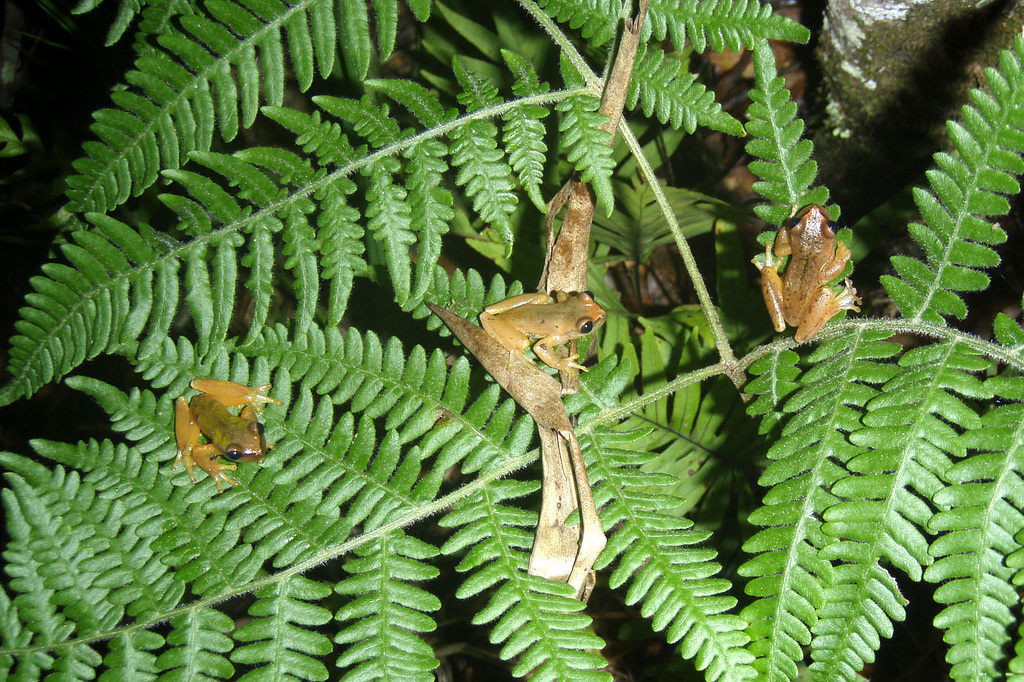
- Exerodonta catracha

Scientific classification
- Kingdom: Animalia
- Phylum: Chordata
- Class: Amphibia
- Order: Anura
- Family: Hylidae
- Subfamily: Hylinae
- Genus: Exerodonta; Brocchi, 1879

Species
- See text.

= Exerodonta =

Genus of amphibians

Exerodonta is a genus of frogs in the family Hylidae. This genus was resurrected in 2005 following a major revision of the Hylidae . Eleven species previously placed in the genus Hyla were moved to this genus. They are endemic to south-central Mexico.

== Species ==
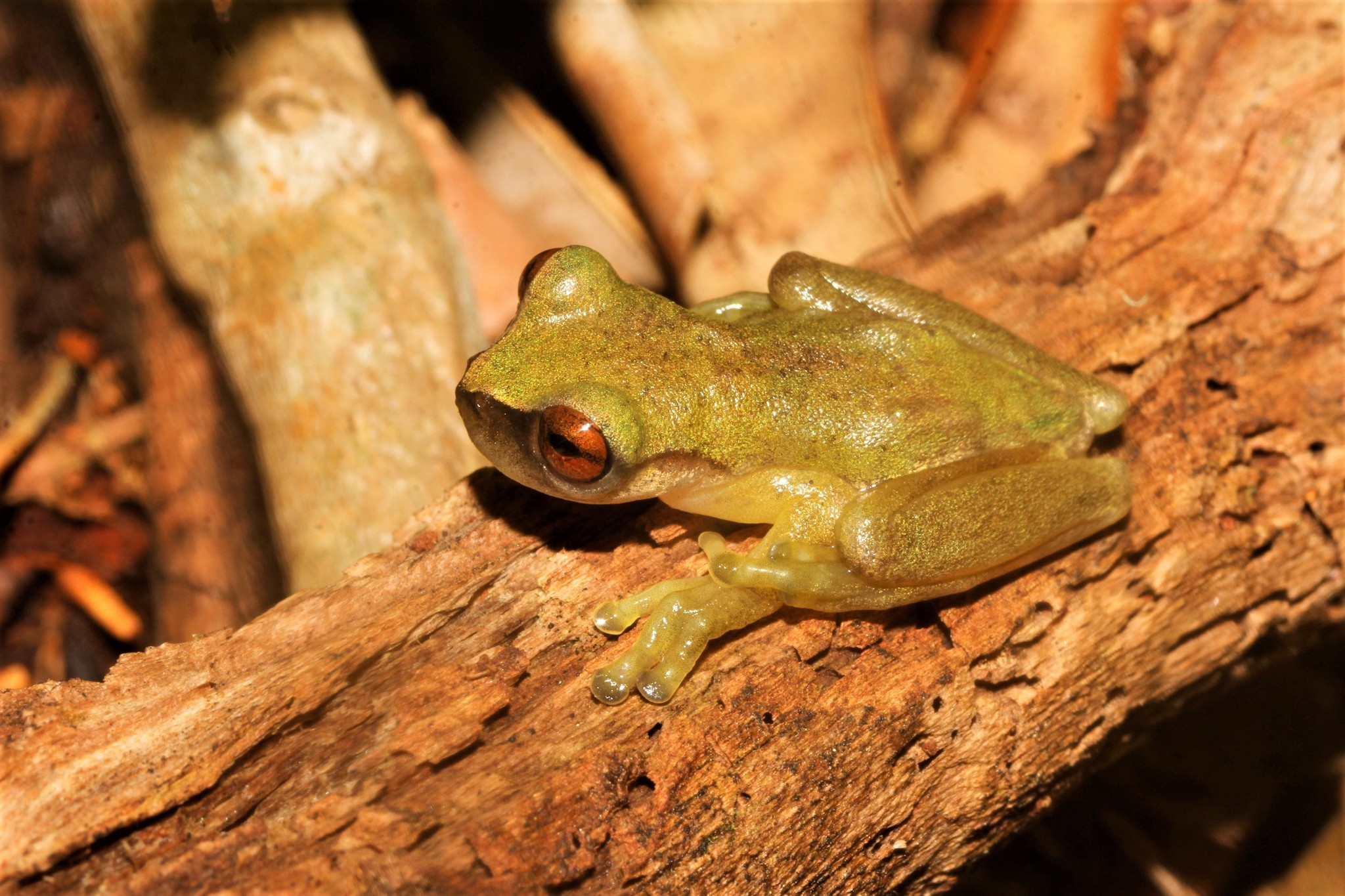
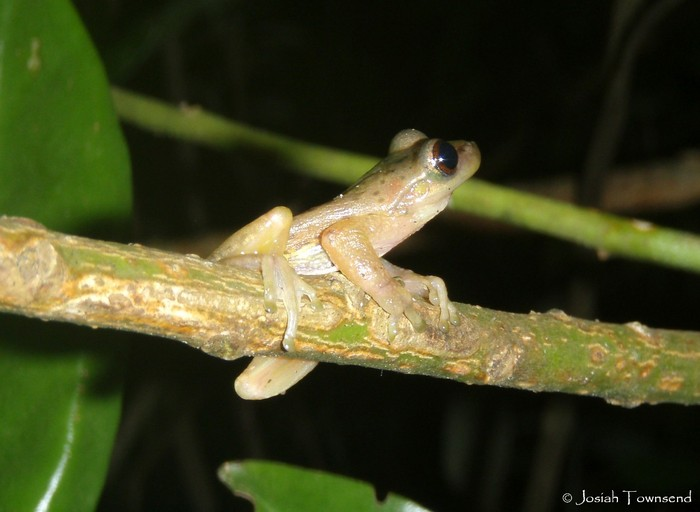
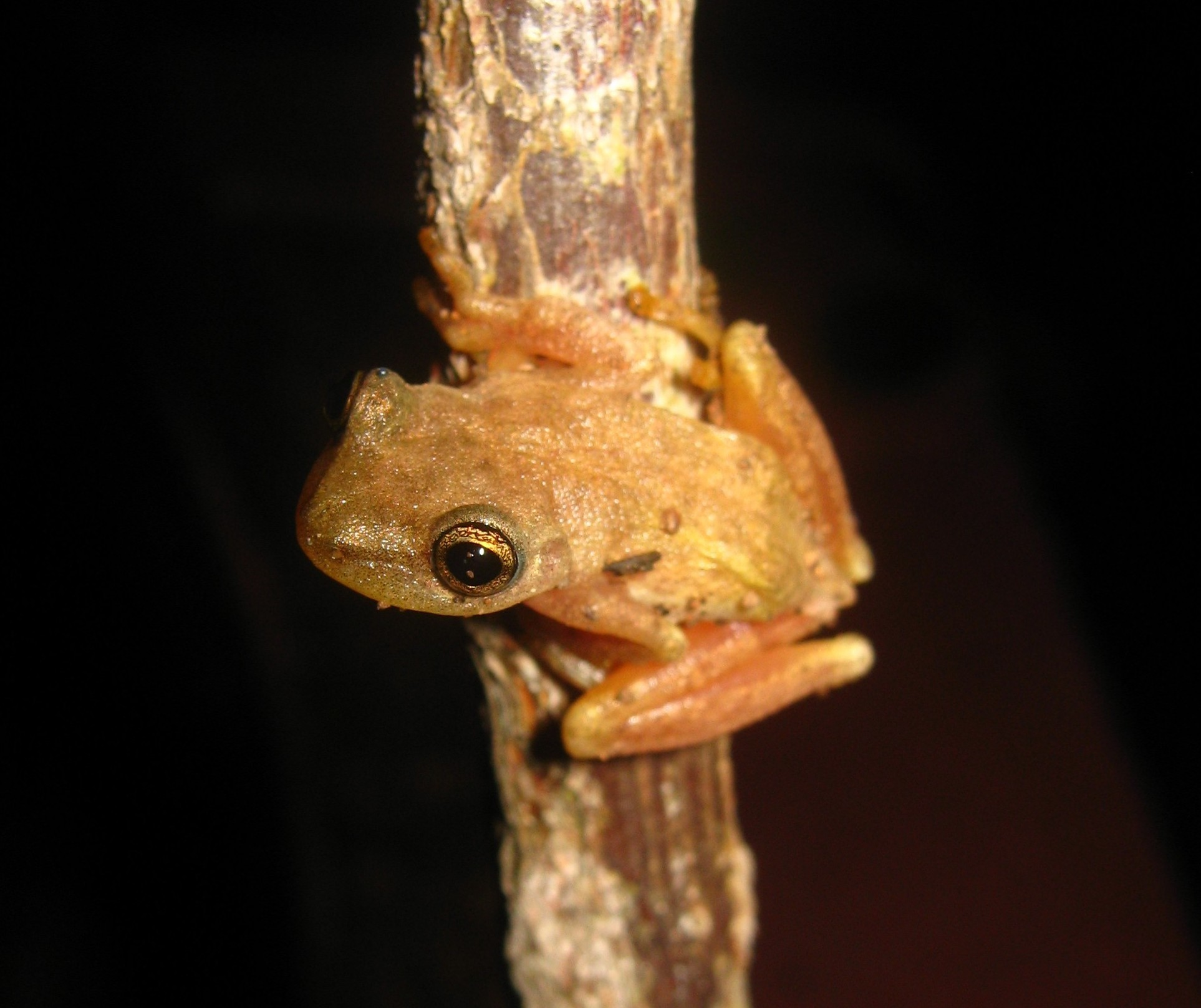
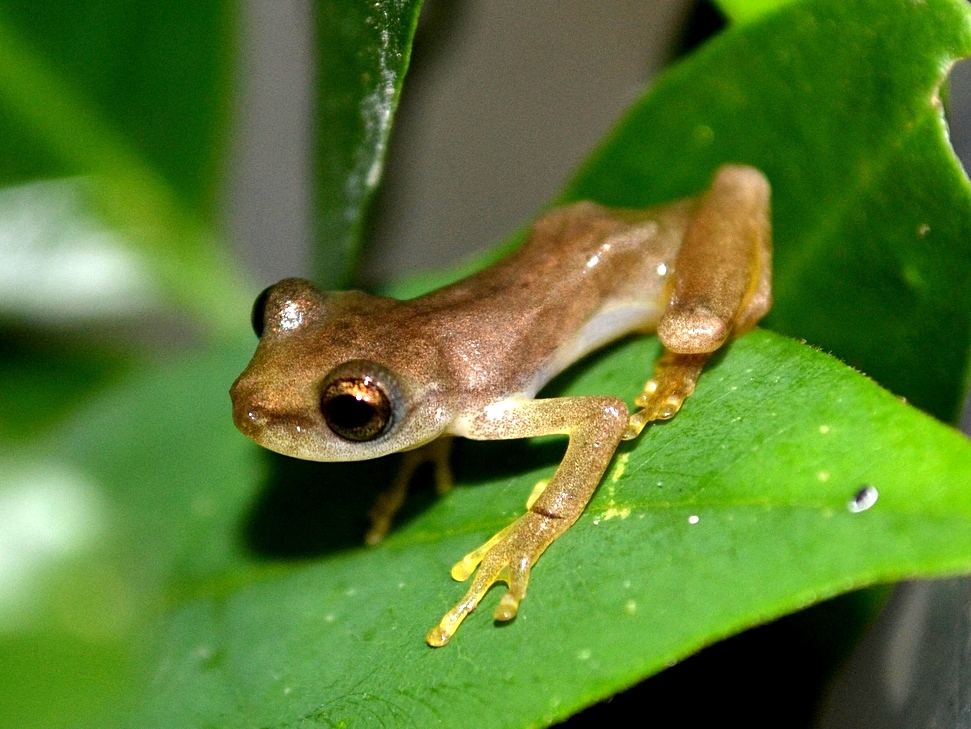
Image	Binomial Name and Author	Common name	Distribution
	Exerodonta abdivita (Campbell and Duellman, 2000)		Mexico.
	Exerodonta bivocata (Duellman and Hoyt, 1961)	Chiapan Highlands tree frog	Mexico.
	Exerodonta catracha (Porras and Wilson, 1987)	Zacate Blanco tree frog	Honduras.
	Exerodonta chimalapa (Mendelson and Campbell, 1994)		Mexico.
	Exerodonta melanomma (Taylor, 1940)	black-eyed tree frog	Mexico.
	Exerodonta perkinsi (Campbell and Brodie, 1992)	Perkins' tree frog	Guatemala.
	Exerodonta smaragdina (Taylor, 1940)	emerald tree frog	Mexico.
	Exerodonta sumichrasti (Brocchi, 1879)	Sumichrast's tree frog	Mexico (Guerrero, Oaxaca, and Chiapas)
	Exerodonta xera (Mendelson and Campbell, 1994)		Mexico.
