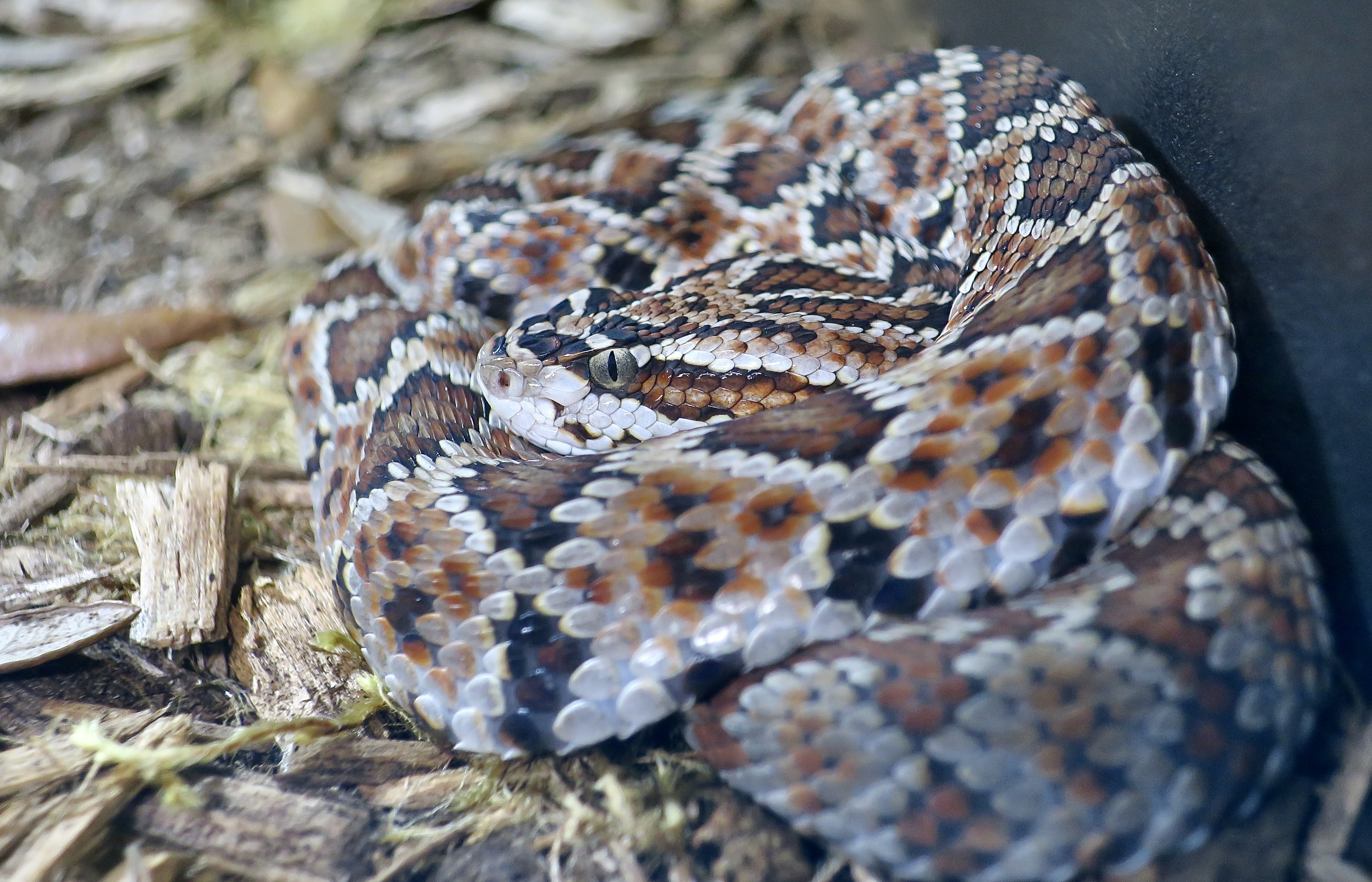

Scientific classification
- Kingdom: Animalia
- Phylum: Chordata
- Class: Reptilia
- Order: Squamata
- Suborder: Serpentes
- Family: Viperidae
- Genus: Crotalus
- Species: C. ericsmithi

Binomial name
- Crotalus ericsmithi Campbell & Flores-Villela, 2008

= Crotalus ericsmithi =

Species of snake

Crotalus ericsmithi, commonly known as the Guerreran long-tailed rattlesnake, is a species of venomous snake of the family Viperidae. The species is indigenous to southeastern Mexico.

== Etymology ==
The specific name, ericsmithi, is in honor of American herpetologist Eric N. Smith.

== Geographic range ==
C. ericsmithi is endemic to the Mexican state of Guerrero.

== Habitat ==
The preferred natural habitat of C. ericsmithi is tropical oak and pine forests at altitudes of 500–1,200 m (1,600–3,900 ft).

== Distinguishing characteristics ==
Compared to most other rattlesnakes, C. ericsmithi has an unusually long tail with a very small rattle.

== Reproduction ==
C. ericsmithi is ovoviviparous.
