= Atlantihyla panchoi =

Conservation status
- Critically Endangered (IUCN 3.1)

Scientific classification
- Kingdom: Animalia
- Phylum: Chordata
- Class: Amphibia
- Order: Anura
- Family: Hylidae
- Genus: Atlantihyla
- Species: A. panchoi

Binomial name
- Atlantihyla panchoi (Duellman and Campbell, 1982)

Synonyms
- Ptychohyla panchoi Duellman and Campbell, 1982; Hyla panchoi (Duellman and Campbell, 1982)

Species of amphibian

Atlantihyla panchoi, also known as the Guatemala stream frog, is a species of frog in the family Hylidae. It is endemic to eastern Guatemala and is only known from three localities in the Sierra de las Minas and Montañas del Mico ranges. The specific name panchoi honors Laurence Cooper "Don Pancho" Stuart, an American herpetologist.

== Description ==
Adult males measure 31–34 mm (1.2–1.3 in) and adult females, based on a single specimen, 37 mm (1.5 in) in snout–vent length. The snout is rounded but has a pointed tip in dorsal view because of a vertical rostral keel. The tympanum is round but its upper edge is obscured by the heavy supratympanic fold. The fingers bear large discs and are up to about half webbed. The toes are almost fully webbed and bear discs somewhat smaller than the fingers ones. The dorsal ground color is grayish tan with green flecks (especially prominent on the eyelids, sometimes completely ringed by them) and darker brown mottling, or dark brown with darker gray brown markings. There is a white stripe on the edge of the upper lip and a white spot below the eye. A distinctive white stripe runs from above axilla along the flanks to the groin, becoming fragmented posteriorly. The throat, chest, belly and ventral surfaces of the limbs are pale yellow with scattered dark brown flecks. The iris is blood orange.

A tadpole of Gosner stage 30 measures 43 mm (1.7 in) in total length, of which almost three quarters is the tail.

== Habitat and conservation ==
Atlantihyla panchoi inhabits moist tropical forests at elevations of 100–895 m (328–2,936 ft) above sea level. It often occurs along streams, and does not occur in degraded habitats. Specimens have been seen about 1–3 m (3–10 ft) high in dense vegetation, often sitting on the tops of leaves. Breeding takes place in streams.

Though once relatively easy to find in suitable habitat, this species is now uncommon and may already have been extirpated from its type locality. It is threatened by habitat loss caused by expanding agriculture, wood extraction, and human settlement, as well as by water pollution and chytridiomycosis. It has been recorded in two protected areas, Sierra de las Minas biosphere reserve and Reserva Protector de Mantanial Cerro de San Gil (Sierra del Mico).
