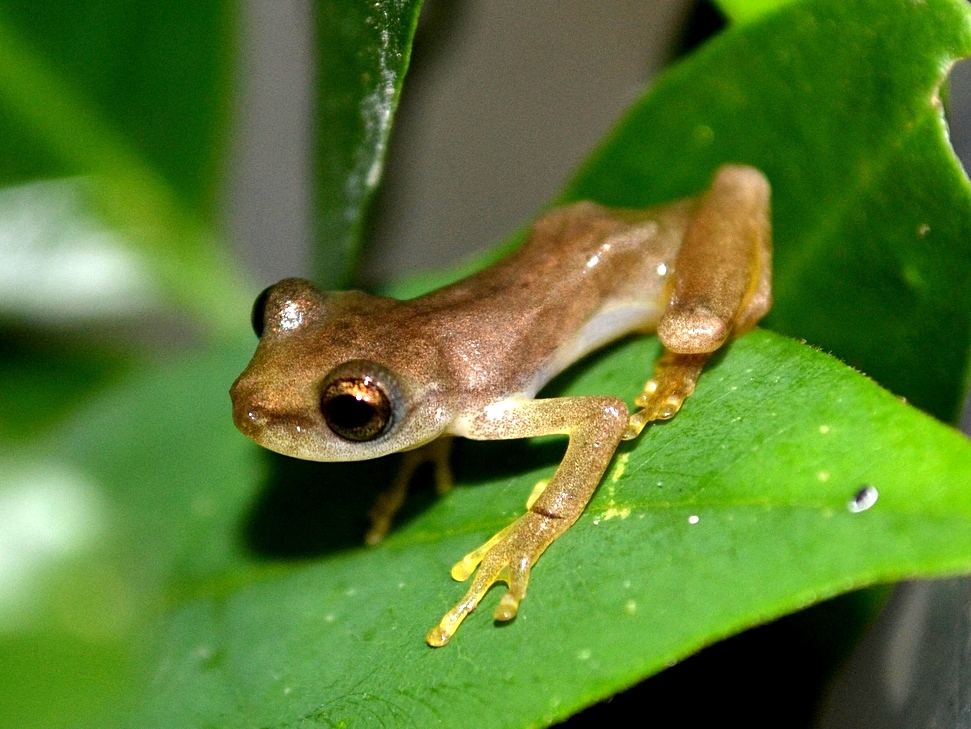

Conservation status
- Least Concern (IUCN 3.1)

Scientific classification
- Kingdom: Animalia
- Phylum: Chordata
- Class: Amphibia
- Order: Anura
- Family: Hylidae
- Genus: Exerodonta
- Species: E. sumichrasti

Binomial name
- Exerodonta sumichrasti Brocchi, 1879

Synonyms
- Hylella platycephala Cope, 1879; Hylella sumichrasti (Brocchi, 1879); Hyla sumichrasti (Brocchi, 1879)

= Exerodonta sumichrasti =

Species of frog

Exerodonta sumichrasti (common name: Sumichrast's treefrog) is a species of frog in the family Hylidae. It is endemic to Mexico and known from the Pacific slopes of southern Mexico in the Guerrero, Oaxaca, and Chiapas states as well as from the Chiapan highlands.

== Description ==
Adult males measure 23–28 mm (0.91–1.10 in) and adult females 29–33 mm (1.1–1.3 in) in snout–vent length. The head is broad and flat and with a long and pointed snout in dorsal profile. The tympanum is distinct but sometimes covered by skin posteroventrally. The arms are short and robust, with short and stout fingers bearing moderately large discs; the fingers are partially webbed. The legs are also relatively short and robust. The toes are moderately long and slender. They bear discs that are slightly smaller than the finger discs; the toes are three-quarters webbed. The dorsal coloration is variable, ranging from a nearly uniform pale green or grayish green to yellowish tan or pale brown. Some specimens have minute, darker flecks.

== Habitat and conservation ==
Its natural habitats are sub-humid oak and pine forests at elevations of 200–2,000 m (660–6,560 ft) above sea level. It is often found in arboreal bromeliads in the dry season. Breeding takes place in streams. Although a common species, it is threatened by habitat loss.
