= Nototriton richardi =

Conservation status
- Least Concern (IUCN 3.1)

Scientific classification
- Kingdom: Animalia
- Phylum: Chordata
- Class: Amphibia
- Order: Urodela
- Family: Plethodontidae
- Genus: Nototriton
- Species: N. richardi

Binomial name
- Nototriton richardi (Taylor, 1949)

Synonyms
- Parvimolge richardi Taylor, 1949; Chiropterotriton richardi Wake and Lynch, 1976; Nototriton richardi Wake and Elias, 1983; Nototriton (Nototriton) richardi Dubois and Raffaëlli, 2012

Species of amphibian

Nototriton richardi commonly known as Richard's salamander is a species of salamander in the family Plethodontidae. It is endemic to the Cordillera Central, Costa Rica.

Its natural habitat is tropical moist montane forests. It is threatened by habitat loss.

== Sources ==
- Frost, Darrel (2017). "Nototriton richardi (Taylor, 1949)". Amphibian Species of the World 6.0, an Online Reference. American Museum of Natural History.
- Taylor, Edward H. (1949). "New salamanders from Costa Rica". The University of Kansas Science Bulletin. 33 (6): 279–288. doi:10.5962/bhl.part.16130.
