= Chinamococh stream frog =

Conservation status
- Endangered (IUCN 3.1)

Scientific classification
- Kingdom: Animalia
- Phylum: Chordata
- Class: Amphibia
- Order: Anura
- Family: Hylidae
- Genus: Quilticohyla
- Species: Q. sanctaecrucis

Binomial name
- Quilticohyla sanctaecrucis (Campbell & Smith, 1992)

Synonyms
- Ptychohyla sanctaecrucis Campbell and Smith, 1992

Species of amphibian

The Chinamococh stream frog (Quilticohyla sanctaecrucis) is a species of frog in the family Hylidae endemic to Guatemala. Its natural habitats are subtropical or tropical moist lowland forests and rivers. It is threatened by habitat loss.
