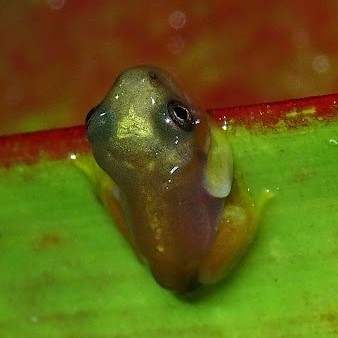

Conservation status
- Endangered (IUCN 3.1)

Scientific classification
- Kingdom: Animalia
- Phylum: Chordata
- Class: Amphibia
- Order: Anura
- Family: Hylidae
- Genus: Bromeliohyla
- Species: B. melacaena

Binomial name
- Bromeliohyla melacaena (McCranie and Castañeda, 2006)

Synonyms
- Hyla melacaena McCranie and Castañeda, 2006; Isthmohyla melacaena – McCranie, 2007; Bromeliohyla melacaena – Faivovich et al., 2018

= Bromeliohyla melacaena =

Species of frog

Bromeliohyla melacaena is a species of frog in the family Hylidae. It is endemic to the Sierra de Omoa in north-western Honduras where it has been recorded from Cusuco National Park and Merendón Reserve.

== Description ==
Adult males measure 21.8–22.6 mm in snout-vent length and adult females 24.2–25.9 mm.

This frog exhibits considerable sexual dimorphism: the adult male frog has spikes on its thumbs. The adult male frogs are light brown with yellow spots and some light green marks. The bones are white and visible through the skin. The legs are light brown. The skin of the ventrum is white. The adult female frog is dark brown with a light brown intraocular stripe. The snout is yellow-green in color. The female frog has a lighter belly than the male frog. They iris is orange with black spots in both male and female frogs.

== Habitat and reproduction ==
Bromeliohyla melacaena occurs in montane pine forest and broadleaf cloud forest at elevations of 1,200–2,200 m (3,900–7,200 ft) above sea level. Adult frogs can be found on palms and low vegetation, particularly in bromeliads of the genus Catopsis. Tadpoles have been found in the same bromeliads. Males call at night some 1–5 m above the ground. During the daytime, adults appear to retreat into bromeliads.

== Etymology ==
The specific name of this frog, melacaena, comes from Greek language words meaning "black" and "thorn or spine." The name refers to the black spikes on the male frogs' thumbs.

== Threats ==
This frog has been assessed as "endangered" by the International Union for Conservation of Nature (IUCN): although locally common, its range is small and its habitat is declining in both extent and quality. In particular, it is threatened by expansion of agricultural activities, also within protected areas. Other threats include expanding human settlements, agricultural chemicals, forest fires, and logging. Furthermore, a boring pine beetle has devastated pine forests. Climate change and chytridiomycosis are also potential threats.
