= Jonathan A. Campbell =

American herpetologist

- Born: Jonathan Atwood Campbell; May 13, 1947 (age 79)
- Citizenship: American
- Education: University of Texas at Arlington, University of Kansas
- Known for: Venomous Reptiles of the Western Hemisphere, reptiles and amphibians of Mesoamerica
- Awards: Herpetologists' League Distinguished Herpetologist
- Scientific career
- Fields: Biology, Herpetology
- Author abbrev. (zoology): Campbell

Jonathan Atwood Campbell (born May 13, 1947) is an American herpetologist. He is currently professor of biology at University of Texas at Arlington. He was a distinguished professor and chair of the Department of Biology, University of Texas at Arlington, Arlington, Texas.

Campbell earned his Bachelor of Science in biology at the University of Texas at Arlington, and he earned his PhD degree in systematics and ecology in 1982 at University of Kansas.

== Honors and awards ==
- June 2014 - Distinguished Honoree
- March 2014 - Distinguished Alumnus Award
- August 2012 - Fitch Award for Excellence in Herpetology
- June 2008 - W. Frank Blair Eminent Naturalist Award
- June 2003 - Texas Distinguished Scientist
- May 2000 - Nominee, Piper Professor Award
- February 2000 - Research Associate
- January 2000 - Scientific Achievement Award
- June 1999 - Distinguished Herpetologist of the Herpetologists’ League
- May 1999 - Academy of Distinguished Teachers
- May 1998 - Distinguished Record of Research Award
- May 1990 - Excellence in Research Award
- May 1990 - Chancellor's Council Excellence in Teaching Award

== Taxa ==
=== Named after him ===
Taxa named after him include:

- Bothrocophias campbelli (Freire-Lascano, 1991)
- Abronia campbelli E.D. Brodie Jr. & Savage, 1993
- Bothrops jonathani Harvey, 1994
- Incilius campbelli (Mendelson, 1994)
- Craugastor myllomyllon (Savage, 2000)
- Craugastor campbelli (E.N. Smith, 2005)
- Anolis campbelli (G. Köhler & E.N. Smith, 2008)
- Crotalus campbelli Bryson, Linkem, Dorcas, Lathrop, Jones, Alvarado-Díaz, Grünwald & Murphy, 2014

=== Described by him ===
Taxa he described include:

- Abronia anzuetoi Campbell & Frost, 1993
- Abronia frosti Campbell, Sasa, Acevedo & Mendelson, 1998
- Abronia gaiophantasma Campbell & Frost, 1993
- Abronia leurolepis Campbell & Frost, 1993
- Abronia meledona Campbell & Brodie, 1999
- Abronia mitchelli Campbell, 1982
- Abronia ornelasi Campbell, 1984
- Abronia ramirezi Campbell, 1994
- Abronia smithi Campbell & Frost, 1993
- Adelphicos daryi Campbell & Ford, 1982
- Adelphicos ibarrorum Campbell & Brodie, 1988
- Amietophrynus Frost, Grant, Faivovich, Bain, Haas, Haddad, de Sá, Channing, Wilkinson, Donnellan, Raxworthy, Campbell, Blotto, Moler, Drewes, Nussbaum, Lynch, Green & Wheeler, 2006
- Anolis naufragus (Campbell, Hillis & Lamar, 1989)
- Bokermannohyla Faivovich, Haddad, Garcia, Frost, Campbell & Wheeler, 2005
- Bolitoglossa centenorumCampbell, Smith, Streicher, Acevedo & Brodie, 2010
- Bolitoglossa daryorum Campbell, Smith, Streicher, Acevedo & Brodie, 2010
- Bolitoglossa eremia Campbell, Smith, Streicher, Acevedo & Brodie, 2010
- Bolitoglossa huehuetenanguensis Campbell, Smith, Streicher, Acevedo & Brodie, 2010
- Bolitoglossa kaqchikelorum Campbell, Smith, Streicher, Acevedo & Brodie, 2010
- Bolitoglossa la Campbell, Smith, Streicher, Acevedo & Brodie, 2010
- Bolitoglossa ninadormida Campbell, Smith, Streicher, Acevedo & Brodie, 2010
- Bolitoglossa nussbaumi Campbell, Smith, Streicher, Acevedo & Brodie, 2010
- Bolitoglossa nympha Campbell, Smith, Streicher, Acevedo & Brodie, 2010
- Bolitoglossa pacaya Campbell, Smith, Streicher, Acevedo & Brodie, 2010
- Bolitoglossa psephena Campbell, Smith, Streicher, Acevedo & Brodie, 2010
- Bolitoglossa suchitanensis Campbell, Smith, Streicher, Acevedo & Brodie, 2010
- Bolitoglossa tzultacaj Campbell, Smith, Streicher, Acevedo & Brodie, 2010
- Bolitoglossa xibalba Campbell, Smith, Streicher, Acevedo & Brodie, 2010
- Bothriechis thalassinus Campbell & Smith, 2000
- Bothrocophias Gutberlet & Campbell, 2001
- Bothrocophias myersi Gutberlet & Campbell, 2001
- Bromeliohyla Faivovich, Haddad, Garcia, Frost, Campbell & Wheeler, 2005
- Cenaspis Campbell, Smith & Hall, 2018
- Cerrophidion Campbell & Lamar, 1992
- Cerrophidion tzotzilorum (Campbell, 1985)
- Chapinophis xanthocheilus Campbell & Smith, 1998
- Charadrahyla Faivovich, Haddad, Garcia, Frost, Campbell & Wheeler, 2005
- Charadrahyla nephila (Mendelson & Campbell, 1999)
- Charadrahyla tecuani Campbell, Blancas-Hernández & Smith, 2009
- Coniophanes alvarezi Campbell, 1989
- Craugastor adamastus (Campbell, 1994)
- Craugastor amniscola (Campbell & Savage, 2000)
- Craugastor aphanus (Campbell, 1994)
- Craugastor catalinae (Campbell & Savage, 2000)
- Craugastor charadra (Campbell & Savage, 2000)
- Craugastor inachus (Campbell & Savage, 2000)
- Craugastor palenque (Campbell & Savage, 2000)
- Craugastor pelorus (Campbell & Savage, 2000)
- Craugastor polymniae (Campbell, Lamar & Hillis, 1989)
- Craugastor psephosypharus (Campbell, Savage & Meyer, 1994)
- Craugastor rhyacobatrachus (Campbell & Savage, 2000)
- Craugastor rivulus (Campbell & Savage, 2000)
- Craugastor rupinius (Campbell & Savage, 2000)
- Craugastor sabrinus (Campbell & Savage, 2000)
- Craugastor trachydermus (Campbell, 1994)
- Crotalus ericsmithi Campbell & Flores-Villela, 2008
- Crotalus tancitarensis Alvarado-díaz & Campbell, 2004
- Cruziohyla Faivovich, Haddad, Garcia, Frost, Campbell & Wheeler, 2005
- Cryptotriton monzoni (Campbell & Smith, 1998)
- Cryptotriton wakei (Campbell & Smith, 1998)
- Dendrotriton chujorum Campbell, Smith, Streicher, Acevedo & Brodie, 2010
- Dendrotriton kekchiorum Campbell, Smith, Streicher, Acevedo & Brodie, 2010
- Diploglossus ingridae Werler & Campbell, 2004
- Diploglossus legnotus Campbell & Camarillo, 1994
- Duellmanohyla Campbell & Smith, 1992
- Duttaphrynus Frost, Grant, Faivovich, Bain, Haas, Haddad, de Sá, Channing, Wilkinson, Donnellan, Raxworthy, Campbell, Blotto, Moler, Drewes, Nussbaum, Lynch, Green & Wheeler, 2006
- Ecnomiohyla Faivovich, Haddad, Garcia, Frost, Campbell & Wheeler, 2005
- Exerodonta abdivita (Campbell & Duellman, 2000)
- Exerodonta chimalapa (Mendelson & Campbell, 1994)
- Exerodonta perkinsi (Campbell & Brodie, 1992)
- Exerodonta xera (Mendelson & Campbell, 1994)
- Feihyla Frost, Grant, Faivovich, Bain, Haas, Haddad, de Sá, Channing, Wilkinson, Donnellan, Raxworthy, Campbell, Blotto, Moler, Drewes, Nussbaum, Lynch, Green & Wheeler, 2006
- Geophis pyburni Campbell & Murphy, 1977
- Ingerophrynus Frost, Grant, Faivovich, Bain, Haas, Haddad, de Sá, Channing, Wilkinson, Donnellan, Raxworthy, Campbell, Blotto, Moler, Drewes, Nussbaum, Lynch, Green & Wheeler, 2006
- Isthmohyla Faivovich, Haddad, Garcia, Frost, Campbell & Wheeler, 2005
- Itapotihyla Faivovich, Haddad, Garcia, Frost, Campbell & Wheeler, 2005
- Litoria michaeltyleri Frost, Grant, Faivovich, Bain, Haas, Haddad, de Sá, Channing, Wilkinson, Donnellan, Raxworthy, Campbell, Blotto, Moler, Drewes, Nussbaum, Lynch, Green & Wheeler, 2006
- Megastomatohyla Faivovich, Haddad, Garcia, Frost, Campbell & Wheeler, 2005
- Micrurus pachecogili Campbell, 2000
- Mixcoatlus Jadin, Smith & Campbell, 2011
- Myersiohyla Faivovich, Haddad, Garcia, Frost, Campbell & Wheeler, 2005
- Nototriton brodiei Campbell & Smith, 1998
- Nototriton stuarti Wake & Campbell, 2000
- Oedipina stenopodia Brodie & Campbell, 1993
- Otophryne pyburni Campbell & Clarke, 1998
- Plectrohyla acanthodes Duellman & Campbell, 1992
- Plectrohyla calthula (Ustach, Mendelson, McDiarmid & Campbell, 2000)
- Plectrohyla cyclada (Campbell & Duellman, 2000)
- Plectrohyla ephemera (Meik, Canseco-Márquez, Smith & Campbell, 2005)
- Plectrohyla miahuatlanensis Meik, Smith, Canseco-Márquez & Campbell, 2006
- Plectrohyla pokomchi Duellman & Campbell, 1984
- Plectrohyla psarosema (Campbell & Duellman, 2000)
- Plectrohyla tecunumani Duellman & Campbell, 1984
- Plectrohyla teuchestes Duellman & Campbell, 1992
- Porthidium hespere (Campbell, 1976)
- Poyntonophrynus Frost, Grant, Faivovich, Bain, Haas, Haddad, de Sá, Channing, Wilkinson, Donnellan, Raxworthy, Campbell, Blotto, Moler, Drewes, Nussbaum, Lynch, Green & Wheeler, 2006
- Pseudepidalea Frost, Grant, Faivovich, Bain, Haas, Haddad, de Sá, Channing, Wilkinson, Donnellan, Raxworthy, Campbell, Blotto, Moler, Drewes, Nussbaum, Lynch, Green & Wheeler, 2006
- Pseudoeurycea aquatica Wake & Campbell, 2001
- Pseudoeurycea orchileucos (Brodie, Mendelson & Campbell, 2002)
- Pseudoeurycea orchimelas (Brodie, Mendelson & Campbell, 2002)
- Ptychohyla acrochorda Campbell & Duellman, 2000
- Ptychohyla dendrophasma (Campbell, Smith & Acevedo, 2000)
- Ptychohyla panchoi Duellman & Campbell, 1982
- Ptychohyla sanctaecrucis Campbell & Smith, 1992
- Ptychohyla zophodes Campbell & Duellman, 2000
- Rhadinella anachoreta (Smith & Campbell, 1994)
- Rhadinella xerophila (Ariano-Sánchez & Campbell, 2018)
- Rhadinophanes monticola Myers & Campbell, 1981
- Tantilla ceboruca Canseco-márquez, Smith, Ponce-Campos, Flores-Villela & Campbell, 2007
- Tantilla impensa Campbell, 1998
- Tantilla sertula Wilson & Campbell, 2000
- Tantilla tecta Campbell & Smith, 1997
- Tantilla vulcani Campbell, 1998
- Tlalocohyla Faivovich, Haddad, Garcia, Frost, Campbell & Wheeler, 2005
- Vandijkophrynus Frost, Grant, Faivovich, Bain, Haas, Haddad, de Sá, Channing, Wilkinson, Donnellan, Raxworthy, Campbell, Blotto, Moler, Drewes, Nussbaum, Lynch, Green & Wheeler, 2006
- Xenosaurus penai Pérez Ramos, De La Riva & Campbell, 2000
- Xenosaurus phalaroanthereon Nieto-Montes De Oca, Campbell & Flores-Villela, 2001

== Books ==
- Campbell JA, Lamar WW (1989). The Venomous Reptiles of Latin America. Ithaca, New York: Cornell University Press. xiv + 430 pp., 568 figures, 109 distribution maps, 31 tables. ISBN 0-8014-2059-8.
- Campbell JA, Brodie ED Jr. (editors) (1992). Biology of the Pitvipers. Tyler, Texas: Selva. xi + 567 pp., 200 figs., 100 tables, 17 plates with 122 color illustrations. ISBN 0-9630537-0-1.
- Campbell JA (1998). The Amphibians and Reptiles of Northern Guatemala, Yucatán, and Belize. Norman, Oklahoma: University of Oklahoma Press. 367 pp. ISBN 0-8061-3064-4.
- McDiarmid RW, Campbell JA, Touré TA (1999). Snake Species of the World, A Taxonomic and Geographic Reference. Vol. 1. Washington, District of Columbia: The Herpetologists League. xi + 511 pp. ISBN 1-893777-01-4.
- Campbell JA, Lamar WW (2004). The Venomous Reptiles of the Western Hemisphere. (2 volumes). Ithaca, New York: Cornell University Press. xvii + 870 pp., 282 figs., 8 color maps, 113 distribution maps, 1,500 plates, 63 tables. ISBN 0-8014-4141-2.
