= Greater bromeliad tree frog =

Conservation status
- Endangered (IUCN 3.1)

Scientific classification
- Kingdom: Animalia
- Phylum: Chordata
- Class: Amphibia
- Order: Anura
- Family: Hylidae
- Genus: Bromeliohyla
- Species: B. dendroscarta

Binomial name
- Bromeliohyla dendroscarta (Taylor, 1940)

Synonyms
- Hyla dendroscarta Taylor, 1940

Species of amphibian

The greater bromeliad tree frog (Bromeliohyla dendroscarta) is a species of frog in the family Hylidae endemic to the mountains of central Veracruz and northern Oaxaca, Mexico. It has been observed between 450 and 1900 meters above sea level.

== Appearance ==
The adult frog measures about 35 mm in snout-vent length. The skin on the dorsum can be yellow in color with small brown spots to green in color. The iris of the eye is gold in color. The ventrum is yellow in color.

Tadpoles are cream in color with transparent stomachs.

The tadpoles have only been observed eating detritus, such as dead insects that fall into the water in the bromeliad plants.

== Habitat and conservation ==
Bromeliohyla dendroscarta inhabits cloud forests where it breeds and takes refuge in bromeliads.

This species has never been common, but it seems to have dramatically declined and had not been recorded since 1974, despite surveys. However, an unidentified hylid frog was heard calling from bromeliads high in trees in 2007 at one historic location of this species; this frog may have been Bromeliohyla dendroscarta. Surveys in 2011 and 2012 were able to locate the species, and it has been seen a few times since then, proving the species is not extinct. While habitat loss may have contributed to the decline of this species, the main reason probably was chytridiomycosis.

== Original description ==
- Taylor, E. H. (1940). "Two new anuran amphibians from Mexico". Proceedings of the United States National Museum. 89 (3093): 43–47. doi:10.5479/si.00963801.89-3093.43.
