= Anolis campbelli =

Conservation status
- Endangered (IUCN 3.1)

Scientific classification
- Kingdom: Animalia
- Phylum: Chordata
- Class: Reptilia
- Order: Squamata
- Suborder: Iguania
- Family: Dactyloidae
- Genus: Anolis
- Species: A. campbelli

Binomial name
- Anolis campbelli (G. Köhler & E.N. Smith, 2008)

Synonyms
- Norops campbelli G. Köhler & E.N. Smith, 2008; Anolis campbelli — Poe et al., 2017

Species of lizard

Anolis campbelli is an endangered species of lizard in the family Dactyloidae. The species is native to Guatemala and extreme southeastern Mexico.

== Etymology ==
The specific name, campbelli, is in honor of American herpetologist Jonathan A. Campbell.

== Geographic range ==
A. campbelli is found in western Guatemala and in the adjacent Mexican state of Chiapas.

== Habitat ==
The preferred natural habitat of A. campbelli is forest, at altitudes of 1,540–1,660 m (5,050–5,450 ft).

== Reproduction ==
A. campbelli is oviparous.
