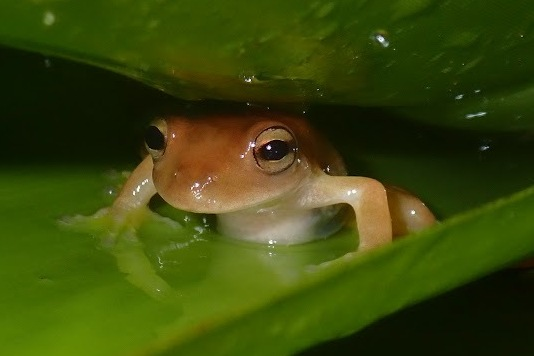

Conservation status
- Least Concern (IUCN 3.1)

Scientific classification
- Kingdom: Animalia
- Phylum: Chordata
- Class: Amphibia
- Order: Anura
- Family: Hylidae
- Genus: Bromeliohyla
- Species: B. bromeliacia

Binomial name
- Bromeliohyla bromeliacia (Schmidt, 1933)

Synonyms
- Hyla bromeliacia Schmidt, 1933

= Bromeliad tree frog =

Species of amphibian

The bromeliad tree frog (Bromeliohyla bromeliacia) is a species of frogs in the family Hylidae.

It is found in Belize, Guatemala, Honduras, and southern Mexico. In Spanish, this frog is known as rana arborícula de bromelia. This frog used to be classified as Hyla bromeliacia before it was moved to the newly formed genus Bromeliohyla in 2005.

Males measure 24.1–29.5 mm and females 32.0–36.0 mm in snout–vent length.

== Distribution ==
The bromeliad tree frog is found in premontane and lower montane wet forests on the Atlantic side of Chiapas State in Mexico, in the Maya Mountains of Belize and Guatemala, in central Guatemala, and in northwest Honduras, at elevations of 350 to 1,790 m (1,150 to 5,870 ft) above sea level. It is found in Belize, Guatemala, Honduras, and Mexico naturally.

== Biology ==
These frogs lay their eggs in the water-filled rosettes of bromeliads or other temporary, water-filled crevices in the canopy, such as the leaf sheaths of banana leaves. The tadpoles complete their development in these small pools.

== Fungal infection ==
A study was undertaken in Honduras to discover whether these frogs were infected by the chytrid fungus, which is causing devastation among amphibian populations worldwide. One-third of the individuals tested were found to be infected. These frogs spend their lives in the canopy and breed in the ephemeral, water-filled bromeliad rosettes, and are unlikely ever to come into contact with streams or pools which might be sources of infection. The researchers surmised the fungus might be spread by insects or birds, or by raindrops, but further research needs to be undertaken to establish how it is dispersed.

== Status ==
The bromeliad tree frog is listed as "Least Concern" in the IUCN Red List of Threatened Species. While it is a relatively rare species, it has quite large distribution area. However, it has declined at higher altitudes, possibly due to chytridiomycosis. In addition to chytridiomycosis, deforestation and pollution are believed to threaten this species. In Guatemala and Honduras, it occurs in several national parks, where it should be free of these threats.
