= Exerodonta xera =

Conservation status
- Vulnerable (IUCN 3.1)

Scientific classification
- Kingdom: Animalia
- Phylum: Chordata
- Class: Amphibia
- Order: Anura
- Family: Hylidae
- Genus: Exerodonta
- Species: E. xera

Binomial name
- Exerodonta xera (Mendelson & Campbell, 1994)

Species of frog

Exerodonta xera is a species of frog in the family Hylidae. It is endemic to Mexico. Its natural habitats are subtropical or tropical moist montane forests, subtropical or tropical dry shrubland, and rivers. It is threatened by habitat loss.
