= Graceful mountain snake =

Conservation status
- Data Deficient (IUCN 3.1)

Scientific classification
- Kingdom: Animalia
- Phylum: Chordata
- Class: Reptilia
- Order: Squamata
- Suborder: Serpentes
- Family: Colubridae
- Genus: Rhadinophanes; Myers & Campbell, 1981
- Species: R. monticola

Binomial name
- Rhadinophanes monticola Myers & Campbell, 1981

Genus of snakes

The graceful mountain snake (Rhadinophanes monticola) is a genus of snake in the family Colubridae.

It is endemic to Guerrero, Mexico, where it is known only from the type locality of Puerto del Gallo in the Sierra Madre del Sur, at approximately 3,000 meters elevation.
