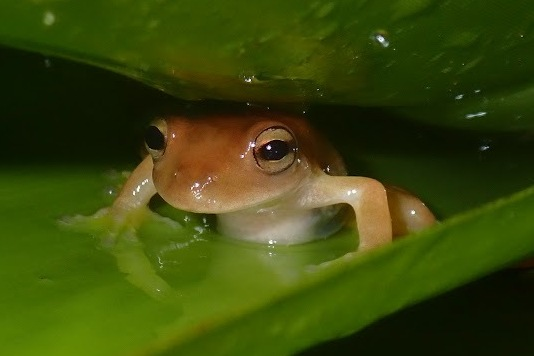

Scientific classification
- Kingdom: Animalia
- Phylum: Chordata
- Class: Amphibia
- Order: Anura
- Family: Hylidae
- Subfamily: Hylinae
- Genus: Bromeliohyla; Faivovich, Haddad, Garcia, Frost, Campbell, and Wheeler, 2005

Type species
- Hyla bromeliacia Schmidt, 1933

Species
- 3 species (see text)

= Bromeliohyla =

Genus of amphibians

Bromeliohyla, sometimes known as the bromeliad treefrogs, is a genus of frogs in the family Hylidae. This genus was erected in 2022 following a major revision of the Hylidae. The two species originally assigned to this genus were previously placed in the genus Hyla. Bromeliohyla corresponds to the former Hyla bromeliacea species group identified in a genetic study by Duellman (1970). Species in this genus are found in tropical southern Mexico, Belize, Guatemala, and northern Honduras.

== Species ==
The genus contains three species:

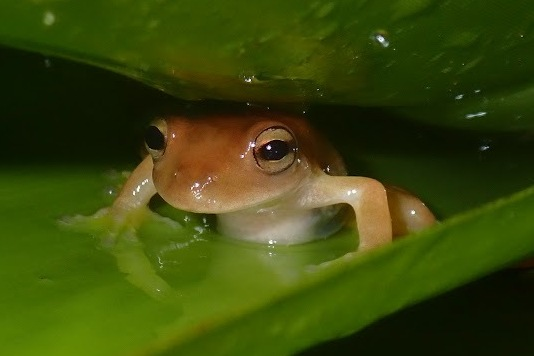
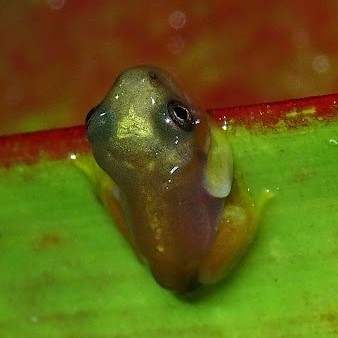
Image	Binomial name and author	Common name
	Bromeliohyla bromeliacia (Schmidt, 1933)	Bromeliad tree frog
	Bromeliohyla dendroscarta (Taylor, 1940)	Greater bromeliad tree frog
	Bromeliohyla melacaena (McCranie and Castañeda, 2006)
