= Guerreran stream frog =

Conservation status
- Endangered (IUCN 3.1)

Scientific classification
- Kingdom: Animalia
- Phylum: Chordata
- Class: Amphibia
- Order: Anura
- Family: Hylidae
- Genus: Quilticohyla
- Species: Q. erythromma

Binomial name
- Quilticohyla erythromma (Taylor, 1937)

Synonyms
- Ptychohyla erythromma (Taylor, 1937)

Species of amphibian

Quilticohyla erythromma, commonly known as the Guerreran stream frog, is a species of frog in the family Hylidae endemic to Mexico. Its natural habitats are subtropical or tropical dry forests, subtropical or tropical moist lowland forests, rivers, and freshwater marshes. It is threatened by habitat loss.
