= Atlantihyla melissa =

Conservation status
- Critically Endangered (IUCN 3.1)

Scientific classification
- Kingdom: Animalia
- Phylum: Chordata
- Class: Amphibia
- Order: Anura
- Family: Hylidae
- Genus: Atlantihyla
- Species: A. melissa

Binomial name
- Atlantihyla melissa Townsend, Herrera-B., Hofmann, Luque-Montes, Ross, Dudek, Krygeris, Duchamp, and Wilson, 2020

Species of frog

Atlantihyla melissa is a species of frog in the family Hylidae, endemic to Honduras. It has been observed between 780 and 1680 meters above sea level in the Cordillera Nombre de Dios mountains. Its known habitat is contained within the Refugio de Vida Silvestre Texiguat.

== Appearance ==
The adult male frog measures 30.4–38.8 mm in snout-vent length and the adult female frog is 30.9–43.9 mm long.

This frog can be any of several colors. Some frogs have spots and some do not. Most frogs have a ventrolateral stripe that can be pale to bright yellow. This frog exhibits considerable sexual dimorphism but scientists note large amounts of inter-individual variation as well. Adult male frogs can have salmon colored eyes or red eyes. Adult female frogs have green eyes or brown eyes.

== Habitat ==
These frogs live in riparian habitats with fast-moving water and rocky beds with pools nearby. At night, scientists have observed these frogs sitting on plants that hang over the water. The adult male's advertisement call can be noted even when the frog himself is hidden.

== Tadpoles ==
The tadpole can grow to be 47.1 mm long. The tadpole has a large oral disk on the bottom of its body. The young frogs emerge from the water as metamorphs in July or July.

== Threats ==
This frog is considered critically endangered because of its extremely small range. Deforestation from logging and construction threaten its habitat.

== Etymology ==
Scientists named this frog after fellow researcher Isis Melissa Medina-Flores, a biologist who studied the amphibians of Honduras. In 2016, she went missing while climbing Honduras' highest mountain, and no sign of her was ever found.
