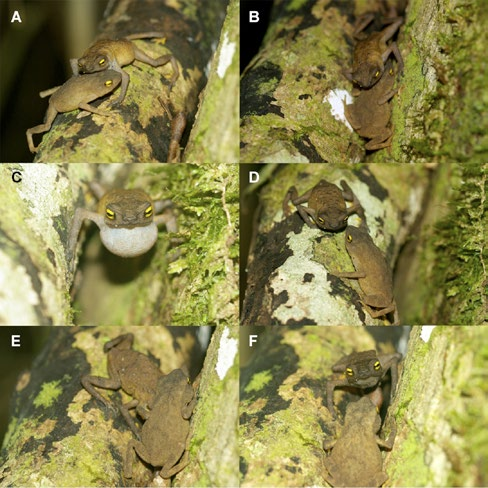
- Interactions between two males

Conservation status
- Least Concern (IUCN 3.1)

Scientific classification
- Kingdom: Animalia
- Phylum: Chordata
- Class: Amphibia
- Order: Anura
- Family: Bufonidae
- Genus: Frostius
- Species: F. pernambucensis

Binomial name
- Frostius pernambucensis (Bokermann, 1962)

Synonyms
- Atelopus pernambucensis Bokermann, 1962

= Frostius pernambucensis =

Species of amphibian

Frostius pernambucensis, or the Frost's toad, is a species of toad in the family Bufonidae. It is endemic to the eastern Brazil where it is known from the Paraíba, Pernambuco, Alagoas, and eastern Bahia states.

== Description ==
Calling adult males from Santa Teresinha, Bahia had an average snout–vent length of 27.8 and 36.8 mm (1.09 and 1.45 in) in 2008 and 2009, respectively. The tympanum is small and vertically elliptical. The digits are long, laterally expanded, and have developed discs. Coloration of both dorsal and ventral surfaces is brown to light brown. The iris is yellow.

The male advertisement call is a long, pulsed call, lasting about eight seconds and having pulse rate of seven per second. The call is repeated about twice every minute.

== Habitat and conservation ==
Frostius pernambucensis occurs in primary and secondary forests at elevations up to 800 m (2,600 ft) above sea level. It lives in terrestrial and arboreal bromeliads and in leaf-litter of the forest-floor. Reproduction requires bromeliads where the eggs are laid. Males call perched in vegetation some 0.2 and 2.5 m (7.9 in and 8 ft 2.4 in) above ground. Males may also engage in visual displays and male-male contests.

The species is threatened by habitat loss caused by agricultural expansion, livestock grazing, clear-cutting, wood plantations and human settlement, and by collection of bromeliads. It can be found in several protected areas.
