= Nototriton brodiei =

Conservation status
- Endangered (IUCN 3.1)

Scientific classification
- Kingdom: Animalia
- Phylum: Chordata
- Class: Amphibia
- Order: Urodela
- Family: Plethodontidae
- Genus: Nototriton
- Species: N. brodiei

Binomial name
- Nototriton brodiei Campbell and Smith, 1998

Species of amphibian

Nototriton brodiei is a species of salamander in the family Plethodontidae. It is endemic to the Sierra del Merendón and known from its type locality, Sierra de Caral in Izabal Department, eastern Guatemala, and from the Cusuco National Park in northwestern Honduras. The specific name brodiei honors Edmund D. Brodie Jr., an American herpetologist. Common name Cerro Pozo de Agua moss salamander has been coined for it.

== Description ==
Females in the type series measure 32–34.5 mm (1.26–1.36 in) in snout–vent length. The tail length is about 1.4 times the body length, giving a maximum total length of 84 mm (3.3 in). The snout is broadly rounded and the eyes are protuberant. The head is just slightly wider than the neck. The parotoid glands are weakly developed. The limbs are short and slender. Both the fingers and the toes are about half-webbed and have sub-digital pads. The dorsum is mahogany or rust-brown and bears dark brown chevrons. The underside is blackish or dark purplish brown and has cream flecks. The tail irregular black or dark brown markings on the sides and ventrally. The iris is bronze.

== Habitat and conservation ==
Nototriton brodiei occurs in subtropical old-growth wet forests at elevations of 760–1,590 m (2,490–5,220 ft) above sea level. Active individuals have been found at night in low vegetation and on a rock bank near a waterfall. During the daytime, a specimen was spotted under a pile of dead palm leaves.

Nototriton brodiei is known from less than ten specimens and appears to be rare, although it might also be difficult to detect. Its habitat is threatened by extensive logging and agricultural encroachment. Illegal logging also occurs in the Cusuco National Park. Use of agrochemicals is also a threat.
