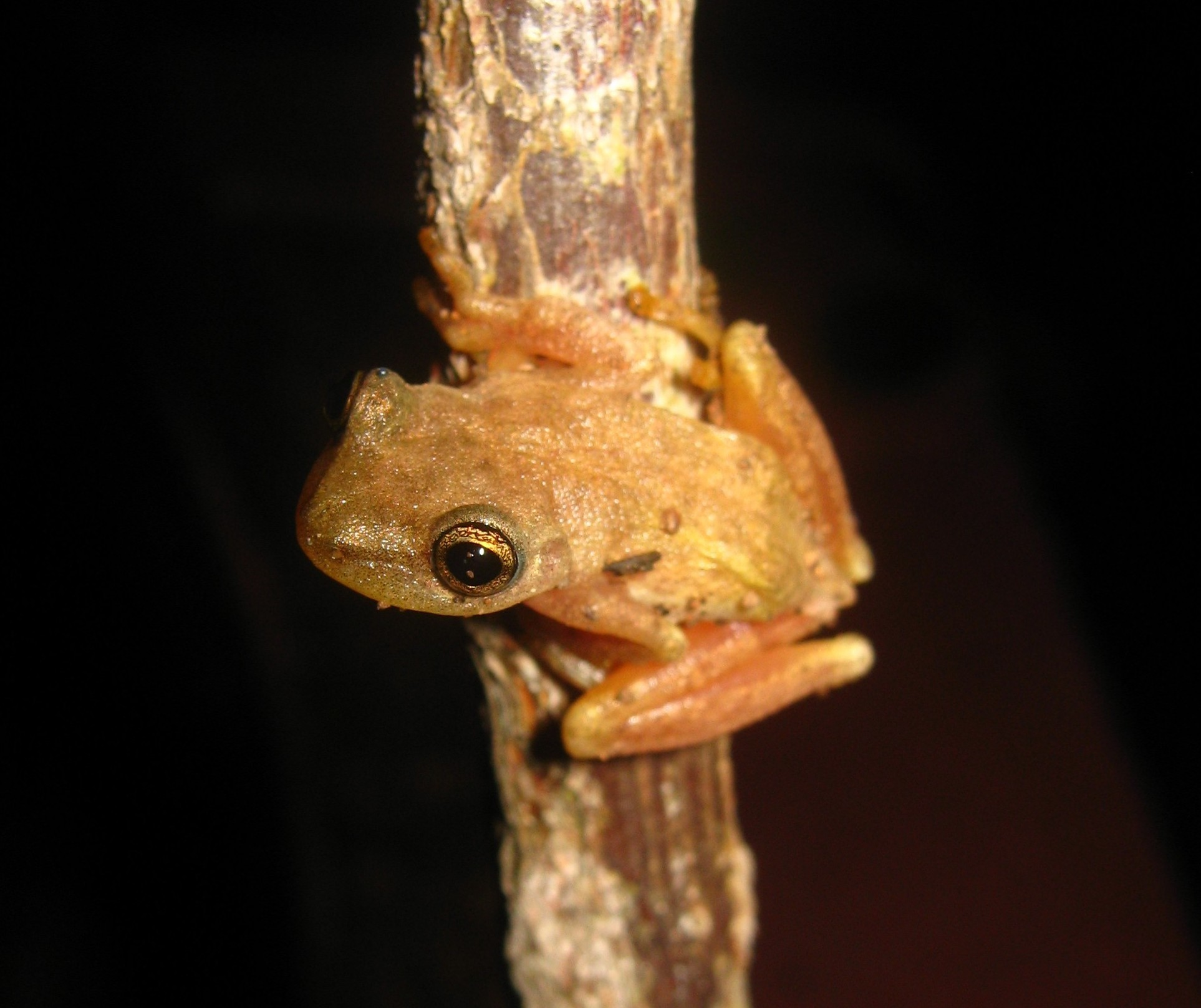

Conservation status
- Least Concern (IUCN 3.1)

Scientific classification
- Kingdom: Animalia
- Phylum: Chordata
- Class: Amphibia
- Order: Anura
- Family: Hylidae
- Genus: Exerodonta
- Species: E. smaragdina

Binomial name
- Exerodonta smaragdina (Taylor, 1940)

= Exerodonta smaragdina =

Species of amphibian

Exerodonta smaragdina (commonly known as the emerald tree frog) is a species of frog in the family Hylidae. It is endemic to Mexico.

== Distribution and habitat ==
Its natural habitats are subtropical or tropical dry forests, subtropical or tropical moist montane forests, rivers, freshwater marshes, and intermittent freshwater marshes. It is threatened by habitat loss.
