= Darrel Frost =

American herpetologist

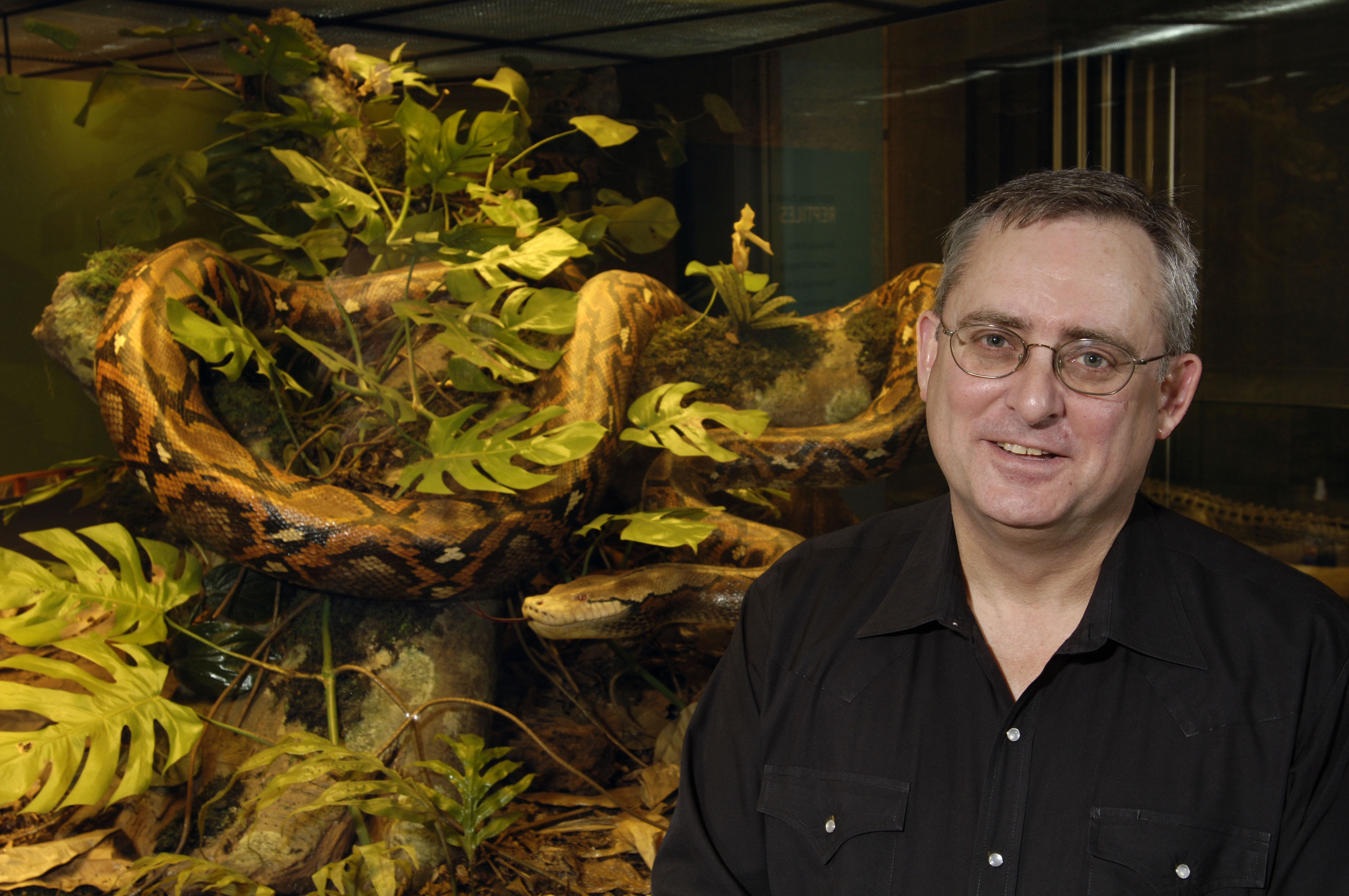
Frost next to diorama of a reticulated python.

Darrel Richmond Frost (born 1951) is an American herpetologist and systematist. He was previously head curator of herpetology at the American Museum of Natural History, as well as president of both the Society for the Study of Amphibians and Reptiles (1998) and the American Society of Ichthyologists and Herpetologists (2006). Four taxa are named in his honor: the toad genus Frostius (which includes Frost's Toad), the tree frog Dendropsophus frosti, Darrel's Chorus Frog Microhyla darreli, and Frost's arboreal alligator lizard Abronia frosti.

== Life ==
Frost became interested in animals after witnessing his father kill a rattlesnake at the age of four. He earned a B.S. in biology from the University of Arizona in 1973, an M.S. in zoology from Louisiana State University in 1978, and a Ph.D. in ecology and systematics from the University of Kansas in 1988. He became an adjunct professor at Columbia University in 2000.

In 1990, Frost was appointed assistant curator of herpetology at the American Museum of Natural History, and in 1995 he was promoted to associate curator. He would later become curator-in-charge and associate dean of science for collections.

== Work ==
Frost and a team of collaborators began work on a catalog of amphibian species, Amphibian Species of the World, in 1980. Frost later explained, "When I started in 1980 on the amphibian catalog, it had been a hundred years since this had been done. So it was an enormous amount of work to catch up because the number of amphibians had basically quadrupled." In 1985, the first edition was published in print. Starting in 1990, Frost completely overhauled the catalog and now publishes it on the website of the American Museum of Natural History. The 1985 catalog had 4,014 species. By 2014, it had grown to more than 7,200, and was being updated almost daily.

Amphibian Species of the World has been described as "the most significant single work in the history of amphibian biology." Frost was awarded the 2013 Sabin Award for Amphibian Conservation in recognition of his work on the catalog. As of 2014, the website is visited more than a million times each year. In 2021 he was awarded the Henry S. Fitch Excellence in Herpetology Award by the American Society of Ichthyologists and Herpetologists.

Frost was lead author of a 2006 study that recommended major taxonomic changes to the amphibian tree of life based on a phylogenetic analysis of 522 species, making it the largest phylogenetic analysis of a vertebrate group to date. Frost has worked in Guatemala, Ethiopia, Mexico, Peru, Namibia, South Africa and Vietnam, and described a number of new species.
