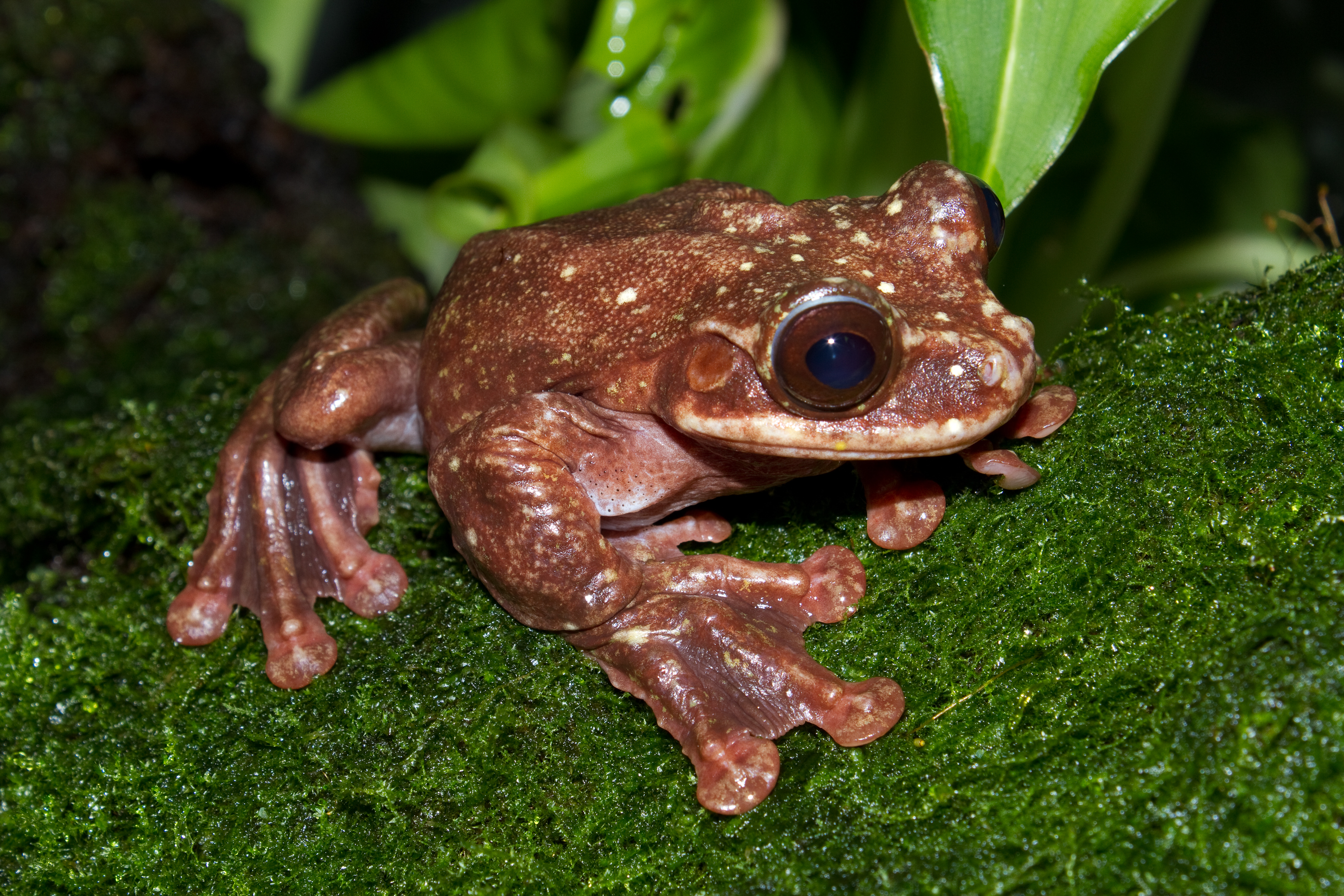

Conservation status
- Critically endangered, possibly extinct (IUCN 3.1)

Scientific classification
- Kingdom: Animalia
- Phylum: Chordata
- Class: Amphibia
- Order: Anura
- Family: Hylidae
- Genus: Ecnomiohyla
- Species: E. rabborum

Binomial name
- Ecnomiohyla rabborum Mendelson, Savage, Griffith, Ross, Kubicki, and Gagliardo, 2008
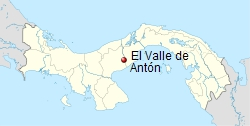
- El Valle de Antón in Panama, the native location of the species

= Ecnomiohyla rabborum =

Rabbs' fringe-limbed treefrog

Extinct species of frog

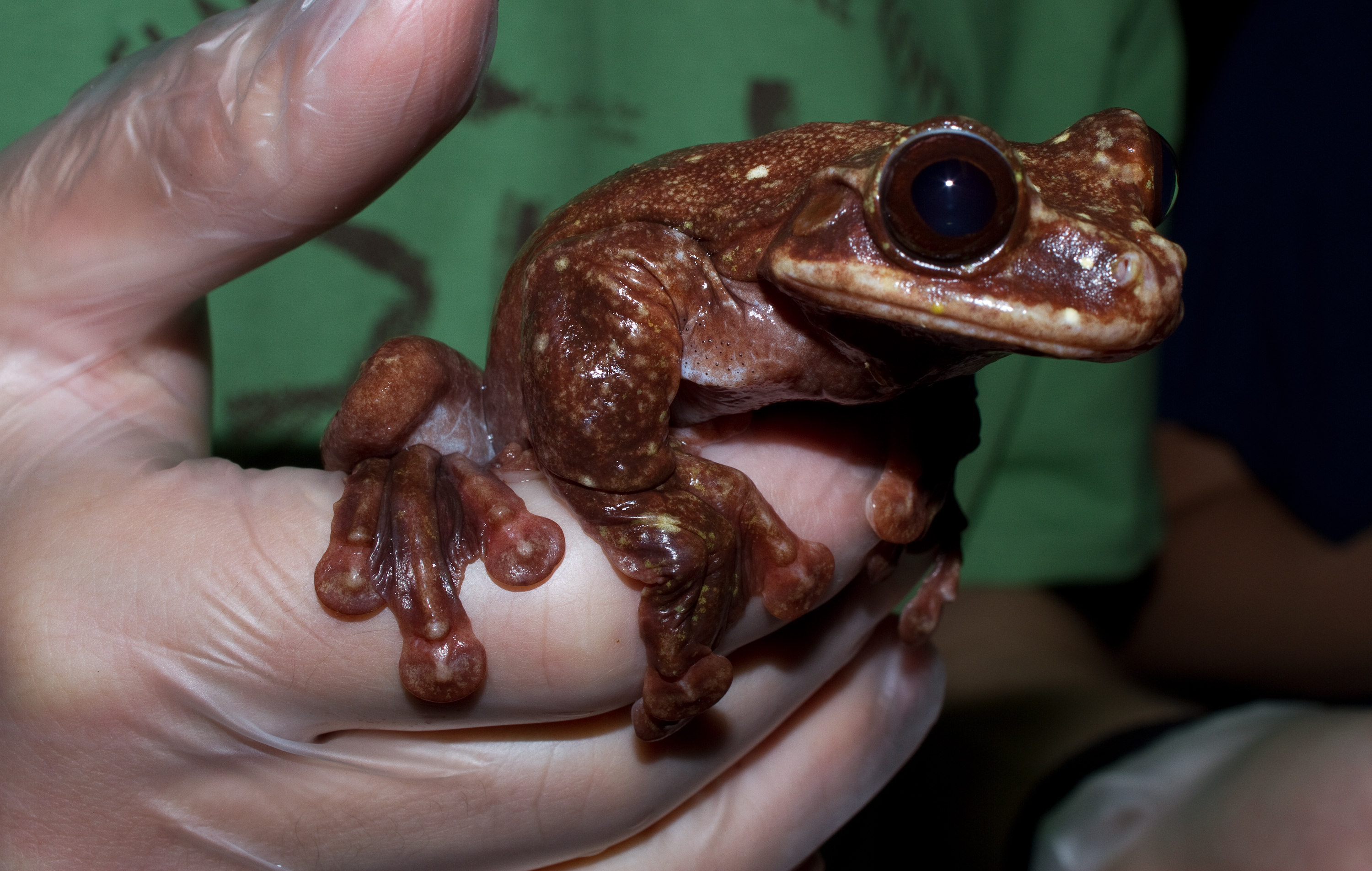
This adult male in the Atlanta Botanical Garden (named Toughie by his handlers) was the last known surviving member of its species until his death on September 26, 2016.

Ecnomiohyla rabborum, commonly known as Rabbs' fringe-limbed treefrog, is a possibly extinct species of frog in the family Hylidae. They are relatively large frogs that inhabited the forest canopies of central Panama. Like other members of the genus Ecnomiohyla, they are capable of gliding by spreading their enormous and fully webbed hands and feet during descent. The males of the species are highly territorial and would guard water-filled tree holes used for breeding. They were also the ones responsible for guarding and caring for the young, including providing food. They were the only known species of frog where the tadpoles derived nutrition by feeding on the skin cells of their fathers. It is also widely considered extinct, following the death of "Toughie", the last Rabbs' fringe-limbed treefrog.

The species was discovered in 2005 and formally described in 2008 by a team of herpetologists led by Joseph R. Mendelson III. It was named in honor of the conservationists and herpetologists George B. Rabb and Mary S. Rabb. It was officially listed as Critically Endangered by the International Union for Conservation of Nature and Natural Resources (IUCN) by 2009. It is believed that the species became extinct in the wild mainly because of an epidemic of Batrachochytrium dendrobatidis in its native range. Despite the efforts of several conservation teams, captive breeding programs all failed. The last known female of the species died in 2009. She was survived by two other individuals, both males. On February 17, 2012, one of the two was euthanized at Zoo Atlanta in Georgia due to failing health. The last known surviving member of the species, an adult male named Toughie, resided at the Atlanta Botanical Garden until his death September 26, 2016.

== Description ==
Ecnomiohyla rabborum is a relatively large frog. The snout-vent length (SVL) of males averaged between 62 and 97 mm (2.4 and 3.8 in), while in females it is between 61 and 100 mm (2.4 and 3.9 in). The head is wider than the body and flattened at the top. The snout is moderately long with nostrils protruding from the sides near the tip. Viewed from the top, the snout was more or less elliptical in shape. The canthal ridge is concave (curves outward) and had thick and rounded edges. The loreal regions are similarly concave. The tympana is smaller in diameter than the eyes and slightly inclined. Smooth glandular structures (known as the supratympanic fold) extend over the tympana from the eyes to the edges of the lower jaw. The tongue is round, and the species possessed narrowly spaced ovoid groups of pre-vomerine teeth.

The arms are short and stout with very large hands. There are no skin folds on the wrists, though a scalloped fringe of skin is present from the elbows to just below the discs on the fourth fingers. The fingers are all relatively short with large flattened discs on the tips. The discs on the second, third, and fourth fingers are about the same diameter as the tympana. Small protrusions known as tubercles are present on the underside of the hands. On the first finger, the tubercles on the tipmost joints are elliptical in shape. On the second and third fingers, the tubercles below the finger joints (subarticular tubercles) were smaller than that on the fourth fingers. There were no tubercles on the palms of the hands though elongated flat tubercles are present behind the bases of the inner fingers (the "thumbs"). Numerous small and round tubercles are also present in between the joints of the fingers. The fingers are more or less fully webbed.

The hind limbs are slender and of moderate length. Like the hands, the feet are very large. When resting, the heels of the legs barely overlapped each other. If stretched forward up the length of the body, the tibiotarsal articulation (the "ankle") would reach beyond the eyes. Like the arms, a fringe of scalloped skin also extends from the heel to the base of the foot on each leg, continuing as a low ridge to the base of the disc of the fifth toe. The toes, like the fingers, possess flattened discs at the tips, though they are slightly smaller in diameter. The tubercles on the tipmost joints of the fifth toes are larger than all of the other subarticular tubercles on the toes. Interspersed between them are numerous small and conical tubercles. The toes are also fully webbed.

The skin of E. rabborum is granular in texture and predominantly a mottled brown. The upper surfaces of the limbs is also mottled brown while the rear surfaces of the thighs are a pale yellow. The chin and upper chest is distinctively brown, though the rest of the underside of the body is mostly white speckled with irregular brown spots. The eyelids and upper surfaces of the limbs and back are studded with green flecks, the appearance and positions of which could be changed by the animal voluntarily (metachrosis). The irises of the eyes are uniformly reddish brown.

During the breeding season, adult males of the species are characterized by greatly enlarged upper arms (humerus) with a bony ridge covered by skin and black keratinized spines. Spines are also present on the upper surface of the area just before the thumbs. These spines are likely used during amplexus.

== Taxonomy ==
Ecnomiohyla rabborum is classified under the genus Ecnomiohyla of the treefrog subfamily Hylinae, family Hylidae. It was first described in 2008 by a team of herpetologists consisting of Joseph R. Mendelson III, Jay M. Savage, Edgardo Griffith, Heidi Ross, Brian Kubicki, and Ronald Gagliardo. During its discovery in 2005, it was initially misidentified by the team as Ecnomiohyla fimbrimembra, but Kubicki recognized it as a new species. The type specimens were raised in captivity. They were obtained from tadpoles collected by Griffith and Ross from an area near El Valle de Antón, Coclé, Panama on July 15, 2005.

The generic name Ecnomiohyla comes from Greek ecnomios ("marvelous" or "unusual") and Hylas, the companion of Hercules. The specific name is in honor of the conservationists and herpetologists George B. Rabb and Mary S. Rabb.

== Distribution ==
Ecnomiohyla rabborum is known only from the cloud forests of the Pacific-facing slopes of the mountains above the town of El Valle de Antón in central Panama, between the provinces of Coclé and Panamá. Its range has an area of less than 100 km^{2} (39 mi^{2}) at altitudes of 900 to 1,150 m (2,950 to 3,770 ft). However, it has not been observed in the area since 2007.

== Ecology and biology ==
Ecnomiohyla rabborum, like other members of the genus, lives in the forest canopy. It is nocturnal and feeds on insects. When threatened, it is capable of gliding through the air by leaping from its perch and fully stretching its massive webbed hands and feet. It can also steer the direction of its descent. In observations, it is known to glide for a distance of 9 m (30 ft). Ecnomiohyla rabborum is one of the few frog species known to glide short distances using large, webbed feet and thin flaps of skin along its limbs, an adaptation that likely evolved to help it move between trees in the rainforest canopy.

The males of the species are highly territorial, defending water-filled tree holes used for breeding. The advertising calls of E. rabborum males consists of "warm up" owl-like calls of three to five notes immediately followed by a single "grrrrrck", which some call a barking sound. The calling bouts happen only at night and last for about one to two minutes, with the intervals longer at the beginning and gradually becoming shorter. Aside from attracting females, the calls may also serve to warn off competing males. Mating occurs throughout the year, though the calls seem to have intensified two to three days before or after a full moon and during the peak mating season from mid-March to May.

Females lay their eggs inside the water-filled tree holes, attached to the wood or bark just above the waterline. After laying their eggs, the females leave while the males remain to guard them. Males may mate more than once, and a single tree hole could contain an egg clutch of 60 to 200 eggs. The eggs hatch into large tadpoles with dorsoventrally flattened bodies and short, blunt snouts. The eyes are situated on top and directed towards the sides. They are not visible when the tadpole is viewed from below. The nostrils are situated about two thirds of the way between the eyes and snout. The mouth is small and located at the bottom of the tip of the snout. Small papillae are present along the sides of the upper lip and along the entire margin of the lower lip. The beaks are robust and with small serrations. The spiracle opens on the middle of the left side of the body. The tail is slender with fins that do not extend to the body. The tadpoles are predominantly pale brown in color. At the time when the legs first appear, they have a snout to vent length of roughly 25 to 27 mm (0.98 to 1.06 in). The tadpoles are so large and numerous that at times, there appear to be more tadpoles than water in the tree holes.

E. rabborum is remarkable in that the males appeared to provide nutrition to the tadpoles directly. During the day, the males back into the tadpole-filled water of the tree holes and remain in that half-submerged state until night. During this time, the tadpoles swim around them, rasping small pieces of skin from their fathers' backs and eating them. This was the first observed instance of any frog species doing this, though it was similar to the way some female caecilians feed their young.

== Conservation ==
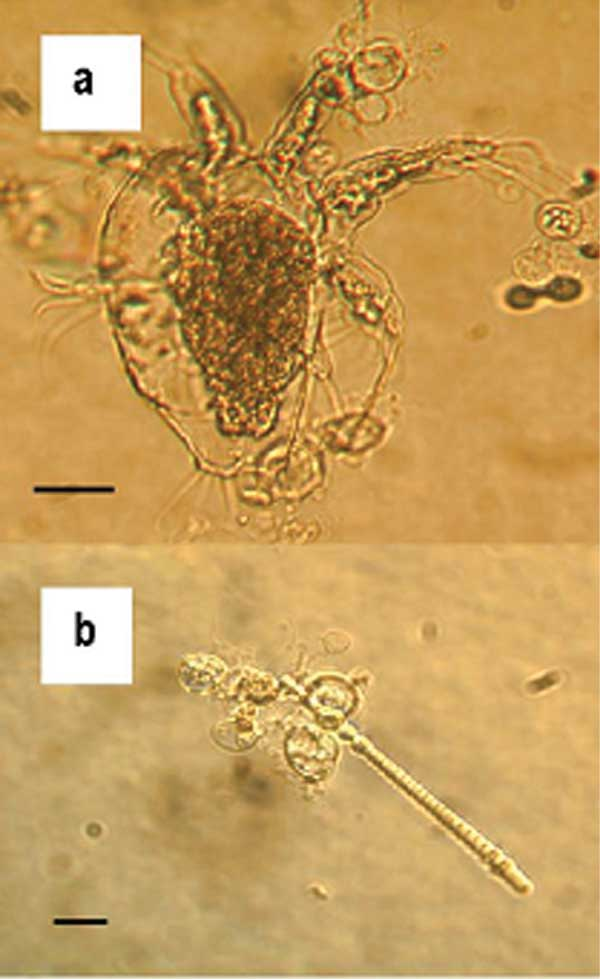
Zoosporangia of Batrachochytrium dendrobatidis (visible as small globular bodies attached to an arthropod at the top and on algae at the bottom)

At the time of its collection, the herpetologists who later described Ecnomiohyla rabborum were already aware of the encroaching threat of the chytrid fungus Batrachochytrium dendrobatidis (colloquially referred to by biologists as "Bd") in Panama. The fungus causes an infectious amphibian disease called chytridiomycosis, which has been linked to the massive decline and extinction of amphibian species in certain parts of the world; including the Americas, Australia, and New Zealand. Infected amphibians can display a wide variety of symptoms, usually including lethargic and abnormal behavior, convulsions, peeling skin, ulcers, and hemorrhaging; eventually resulting in death. The origin of the disease is unknown, but there is speculation that it may have been introduced throughout the world via importation of the African clawed frog (Xenopus laevis).

In 2006, in the hopes of saving the species, the then undescribed specimens of E. rabborum that teams of herpetologists collected were sent to captive breeding facilities in the El Valle Amphibian Conservation Centre (EVACC), Zoo Atlanta, and the Atlanta Botanical Garden. However, these efforts ultimately proved to be futile. The frogs thrived in these facilities but never mated. The last female died in 2009 in the Atlanta Botanical Garden.

In an essay regarding the rapid extinctions of amphibians happening around the world, Joseph R. Mendelson III, the Curator of Herpetology in Zoo Atlanta and one of the scientists who first described E. rabborum, stated that herpetologists in the last 20 years are becoming "forensic taxonomists". Species are now being described just before or even after they have already gone extinct. On the situation of E. rabborum, he comments:

It appears that nature has run its course before three teams of dedicated people were able to determine the needs of these frogs in order for them to reproduce. To have been a part of one of those teams has been a frustrating and sad experience.

Two males in Zoo Atlanta and Atlanta Botanical Garden survived until February 17, 2012, when one of them had to be euthanized to prevent suffering after a decline in health and to preserve valuable genetic material. Though the frog could have been allowed to die naturally, amphibians decompose rapidly. If it had died during the night when no personnel were present, it could have proven impossible to extract genetic material. The Deputy Director of the Zoo, Dwight Lawson commented:

This is the second time in my career that I have literally seen one of the very last of its kind die and an entire species disappear forever with it. It is a disturbing experience, and we are all poorer for it. The ongoing amphibian extinction crisis has taken a rich diversity of animals from us, and more effort and resources are desperately needed to halt the losses.

The last known observation of the frog in the wild was that of a single male heard calling (but not seen) in 2007. At the time of its last survey in 2009, the IUCN classified E. rabborum as Critically Endangered and possibly extinct. More recent estimates deem the species effectively extinct in the wild. A single adult male named Toughie at the Atlanta Botanical Garden was the last known survivor of the species until his death.

== See also ==
- Decline in amphibian populations
- Holocene extinction
- Anthropocene
