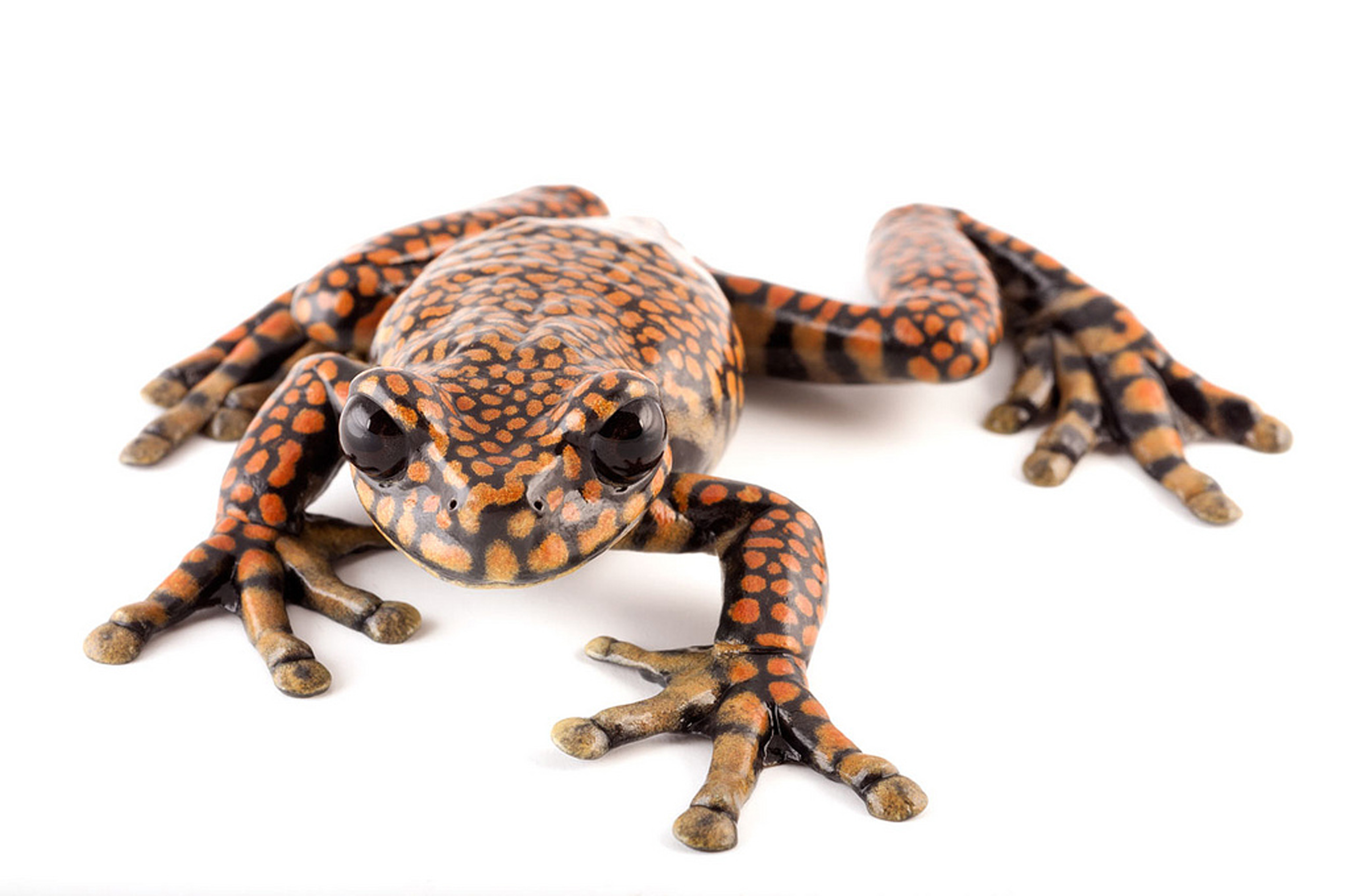
- Hyloscirtus princecharlesi

Scientific classification
- Kingdom: Animalia
- Phylum: Chordata
- Class: Amphibia
- Order: Anura
- Family: Hylidae
- Subfamily: Hylinae
- Tribe: Cophomantini; Hoffmann, 1878

Genera
- See text

= Cophomantini =

Tribe of frogs

Cophomantini is a tribe of frogs in the subfamily Hylinae of the family Hylidae, the true treefrogs.

It contains the following genera:

- Aplastodiscus Lutz, 1950 – canebrake treefrogs (16 species)
- Boana Gray, 1825 – gladiator treefrogs (99 species)
- Bokermannohyla Faivovich, Haddad, Garcia, Frost, Campbell & Wheeler, 2005 (30 species)
- Hyloscirtus Peters, 1882 (40 species)
- Myersiohyla Faivovich, Haddad, Garcia, Frost, Campbell & Wheeler, 2005 (6 species)
- Nesorohyla Pinheiro, Kok, Noonan, Means, Haddad & Faivovich, 2018 (1 species)
- "Hyla" nicefori (Barbour & Dunn, 1921)
