= Hyla auraria =

Conservation status
- Data Deficient (IUCN 3.1)

Scientific classification
- Kingdom: Animalia
- Phylum: Chordata
- Class: Amphibia
- Order: Anura
- Family: Hylidae
- Genus: Hyla
- Species: H. auraria

Binomial name
- Hyla auraria Peters, 1873

Species of amphibian

Hyla auraria is a scientific name used by Wilhelm Peters to describe a species of frog in 1873 based on material that presumably originated from South America. The status of this name placed in the subfamily Hylinae is unclear. The holotype still exists and is in good condition but faded, and it has not been possible to relate it to known species or genera of frogs. Consequently, Hyla auraria is considered a nomen dubium.
