= Paludicola =

Paludicola may refer to:

- 8977 Paludicola, a minor planet
- Paludicola (alga), a genus of algae in the order Batrachospermales
- Paludicola (bacterium), a genus of bacteria in the family Oscillospiraceae
- Paludicola (frog), a junior synonym of Physalaemus
  - Mimic tree frog ("Hyla" imitator), a species formerly classified in Paludicola that is now incertae sedis within Hylinae
- Paludicola (journal)
