= Ecnomiohyla veraguensis =

Conservation status
- Vulnerable (IUCN 3.1)

Scientific classification
- Kingdom: Animalia
- Phylum: Chordata
- Class: Amphibia
- Order: Anura
- Family: Hylidae
- Genus: Ecnomiohyla
- Species: E. veraguensis

Binomial name
- Ecnomiohyla veraguensis Batista, Hertz, Mebert, Köhler, Lotzkat, Ponce, and Vesely, 2014

Species of frog

Ecnomiohyla veraguensis is a frog that lives in Costa Rica and Panama. Scientists have seen it at 540 meters above sea level. It lives in the Talamanca Mountains in Costa Rica and in Santa Fé National Park in Panama.

This frog lives in the forest canopy.
