= Ecnomiohyla thysanota =

Conservation status
- Data Deficient (IUCN 3.1)

Scientific classification
- Kingdom: Animalia
- Phylum: Chordata
- Class: Amphibia
- Order: Anura
- Family: Hylidae
- Genus: Ecnomiohyla
- Species: E. thysanota

Binomial name
- Ecnomiohyla thysanota (Duellman, 1966)
- Ecnomiohyla thysanota is only known from Cerro Malí in extreme eastern Panama

Synonyms
- Hyla thysanota Duellman, 1966

Species of frog

Ecnomiohyla thysanota, also known as Cerro Mali treefrog, is a species of frog in the family Hylidae. It is endemic to Panama where it is known from its type locality, Cerro Malí in eastern Serranía de Darién, near the border to Colombia, where it might also occur. This arboreal species is only known from a single specimen, the holotype.

== Description ==
The holotype is a female measuring 96 mm (3.8 in) in snout–vent length. The head is wider than the body and flat on the top. The snout is moderately long and rounded. The tympanum is distinct albeit partly obscured by the supratympanic fold. The canthus is heavy and rounded. The arms and feet have dermal fringes referred to in its specific name thysanota, from Greek thysanotos, meaning "fringed". The fingers are early fully webbed and bear large discs. The toes are fully webbed and bear discs almost as large as the fingers ones. The living specimen had green dorsum and pinkish white ventral surfaces were. The iris was brown.

== Habitat and conservation ==
The holotype was found in a tree top at night in humid montane forest at 1,265 m (4,150 ft) above sea level. Ecnomiohyla thysanota presumably breeds in water. There is no recent data on this species, and threats to it are unknown. The type locality is inside the Darién National Park.
