= Ecnomiohyla phantasmagoria =

Conservation status
- Data Deficient (IUCN 3.1)

Scientific classification
- Kingdom: Animalia
- Phylum: Chordata
- Class: Amphibia
- Order: Anura
- Family: Hylidae
- Genus: Ecnomiohyla
- Species: E. phantasmagoria

Binomial name
- Ecnomiohyla phantasmagoria (Dunn, 1943)

Species of frog

Ecnomiohyla phantasmagoria is a species of frog in the family Hylidae. It is found in Colombia and Ecuador. Its natural habitat is subtropical or tropical moist lowland forests. It is threatened by habitat loss.
