= Ecnomiohyla valancifer =

Conservation status
- Critically Endangered (IUCN 3.1)

Scientific classification
- Kingdom: Animalia
- Phylum: Chordata
- Class: Amphibia
- Order: Anura
- Family: Hylidae
- Genus: Ecnomiohyla
- Species: E. valancifer

Binomial name
- Ecnomiohyla valancifer (Firschein & Smith, 1956)

Synonyms
- Hyla valancifer Firschein and Smith, 1956

Species of frog

Ecnomiohyla valancifer is a species of frog in the family Hylidae. It is endemic to the slopes of the San Martin Tuxtla volcano, in the Sierra de los Tuxtlas range in southern Veracruz state, Mexico. Its natural habitats are tropical rainforests. It is threatened by habitat loss.
