= George B. Rabb =

American zoologist

George Bernard Rabb (January 2, 1930, in Charleston, South Carolina – July 27, 2017, in Chicago, Illinois) was an American zoologist, and the former director of the Brookfield Zoo from 1976 until 2003. Rabb's pioneering work led the zoo toward its current position as a conservation center, a concept Rabb has championed for zoos everywhere. He joined Brookfield Zoo in 1956 as curator of research. Rabb created the zoo's Education Department and was instrumental in the use of naturalistic exhibitry to provide visitors with environmental immersion experiences throughout the zoo. Rabb had affiliations with conservation associations worldwide and is a respected spokesman on wildlife conservation issues. He won the 1996 Heini Hediger Award, 1997 Silver Medal (Zoological Society of London), and 2008 Lifetime Achievement Award (National Conference on Science, Policy and the Environment).

== Life ==
Rabb graduated from the College of Charleston with a BS in biology, and from the University of Michigan with an MS and PhD in zoology. He helped start the International Species Information System. He was chairman of the IUCN Species Survival Commission from 1989 to 1996 and later served as a board member for the Center for Humans and Nature as well as for the Illinois State Museum. Rabb published widely on such topics as the evolutionary relationships of viperid snakes, behavioral development in okapi, social behavior in captive wolf packs, and breeding behavior of pipid frogs. He founded the Declining Amphibian Populations Task Force and was active in amphibian conservation issues with the Amphibian Survival Alliance and the Amphibian Ark.

The Chicago Zoological Society's Rabb Conservation Medal is named for him. Two amphibians are named for him, Guatemalan bromeliad salamander (Dendrotriton rabbi) and Rabbs' fringe-limbed treefrog (Ecnomiohyla rabborum), the latter also honoring his wife Mary S. Rabb, hence the plural form rabborum.

Rabb died on July 27, 2017, in Chicago after heart surgery as a result of a brief illness. He was 87 years old.
