= Ecnomiohyla echinata =

Conservation status
- Critically endangered, possibly extinct (IUCN 3.1)

Scientific classification
- Kingdom: Animalia
- Phylum: Chordata
- Class: Amphibia
- Order: Anura
- Family: Hylidae
- Genus: Ecnomiohyla
- Species: E. echinata

Binomial name
- Ecnomiohyla echinata (Duellman, 1961)

Synonyms
- Hyla echinata Duellman, 1961

Species of frog

Ecnomiohyla echinata (common name: Oaxacan fringe-limbed treefrog) is a species of frog in the family Hylidae. It is endemic to Sierra Juárez, Oaxaca, Mexico. Its natural habitat is cloud forest at around 2,000 m (6,600 ft) asl. It relies on humid habitats, in particular the vegetation along streams as well as epiphytic plants where it can find refuge. It breeds in streams. It is threatened by habitat loss and the spread of chytridiomycosis.
