= Ecnomiohyla bailarina =

Conservation status
- Near Threatened (IUCN 3.1)

Scientific classification
- Kingdom: Animalia
- Phylum: Chordata
- Class: Amphibia
- Order: Anura
- Family: Hylidae
- Genus: Ecnomiohyla
- Species: E. bailarina

Binomial name
- Ecnomiohyla bailarina Batista, Hertz, Mebert, Köhler, Lotzkat, Ponce, and Vesely, 2014

Species of frog

Ecnomiohyla bailarina, the golden-eyed fringe-limbed tree frog, is a frog in the family Hylidae, endemic to Panama and Costa Rica. Scientists have seen it between 400 and 1400 meters above sea level. It lives in the Talamanca Mountains in Costa Rica and in Santa Fé National Park in Panama.

This frog lives in the forest canopy.
