= Dryaderces pearsoni =

Conservation status
- Least Concern (IUCN 3.1)

Scientific classification
- Kingdom: Animalia
- Phylum: Chordata
- Class: Amphibia
- Order: Anura
- Family: Hylidae
- Genus: Dryaderces
- Species: D. pearsoni

Binomial name
- Dryaderces pearsoni (Gaige, 1929)

Synonyms
- Hyla pearsoni Gaige, 1929; Osteocephalus pearsoni (Gaige, 1929)

Species of amphibian

Dryaderces pearsoni is a species of frog in the family Hylidae. Broadly defined, it is found in Bolivia, Brazil, and Peru. However, the nominal taxon includes two species, and true Dryaderces pearsoni is only known with certainty from Bolivia. The specific name pearsoni honors Nathan E. Pearson, an American ichthyologist who made a "splendid collection of amphibians" during an expedition to Bolivia, including the holotype of this species. Common name Pearson's slender-legged treefrog has been coined for the species.

== Description ==
Adult males measure 43–50 mm (1.7–2.0 in) and adult females 53–69 mm (2.1–2.7 in) in snout–vent length. The snout is rounded. The tympanum is distinct. The outer fingers have some basal webbing, whereas the toes are almost fully webbed. Both fingers and toes bear discs, but the latter are smaller. Alcohol-preserved specimens are grayish brown above and show large, irregular brown spots. The edge of the jaw is white. The upper lip has some indistinct vertical bars. The supra-tympanic fold is brown. The sides of thighs and ventral surface of legs are marbled with brown. The belly and throat are strongly reticulated with brown. The iris in adults is deep dark reddish brown or light with fine dark venation and a broad dark horizontal band.

== Habitat and conservation ==
Dryaderces pearsoni inhabits lowland tropical moist forest, typically in open lakes and swampy areas within, or close to, forest. Breeding takes place in ponds. Habitat loss is a localized threat for this species.
