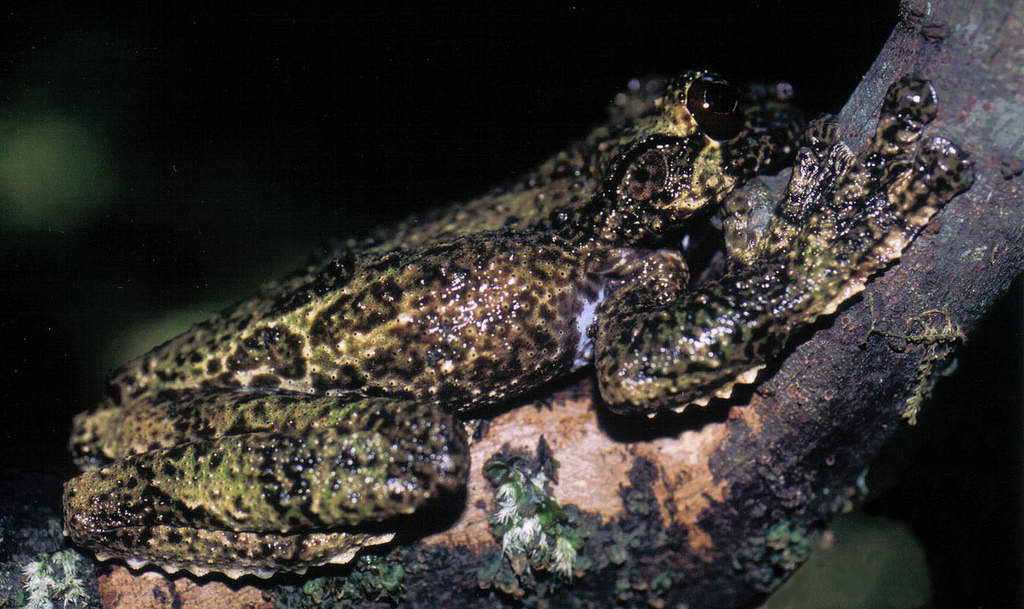

Conservation status
- Least Concern (IUCN 3.1)

Scientific classification
- Kingdom: Animalia
- Phylum: Chordata
- Class: Amphibia
- Order: Anura
- Family: Hylidae
- Genus: Ecnomiohyla
- Species: E. miliaria

Binomial name
- Ecnomiohyla miliaria (Cope, 1886)

Synonyms
- Hyla immensa Taylor, 1952

= Cope's brown treefrog =

Species of frog

Cope's brown treefrog or fringe-limbed treefrog (Ecnomiohyla miliaria) is a species of frog in the family Hylidae. It is found in Costa Rica, Nicaragua, and Panama. Its natural habitats are subtropical or tropical moist lowland forests and subtropical or tropical moist montane forests. It is threatened by habitat loss.
