= Ecnomiohyla sukia =

Conservation status
- Least Concern (IUCN 3.1)

Scientific classification
- Kingdom: Animalia
- Phylum: Chordata
- Class: Amphibia
- Order: Anura
- Family: Hylidae
- Genus: Ecnomiohyla
- Species: E. sukia

Binomial name
- Ecnomiohyla sukia Savage and Kubicki, 2010

Species of frog

Ecnomiohyla sukia, the shaman fringe-limbed tree frog, is a frog in the family Hylidae. It is endemic to Costa Rica. It has been observed between 400 and 1000 meters above sea level.

This frog has extensive webbing on its feet.
