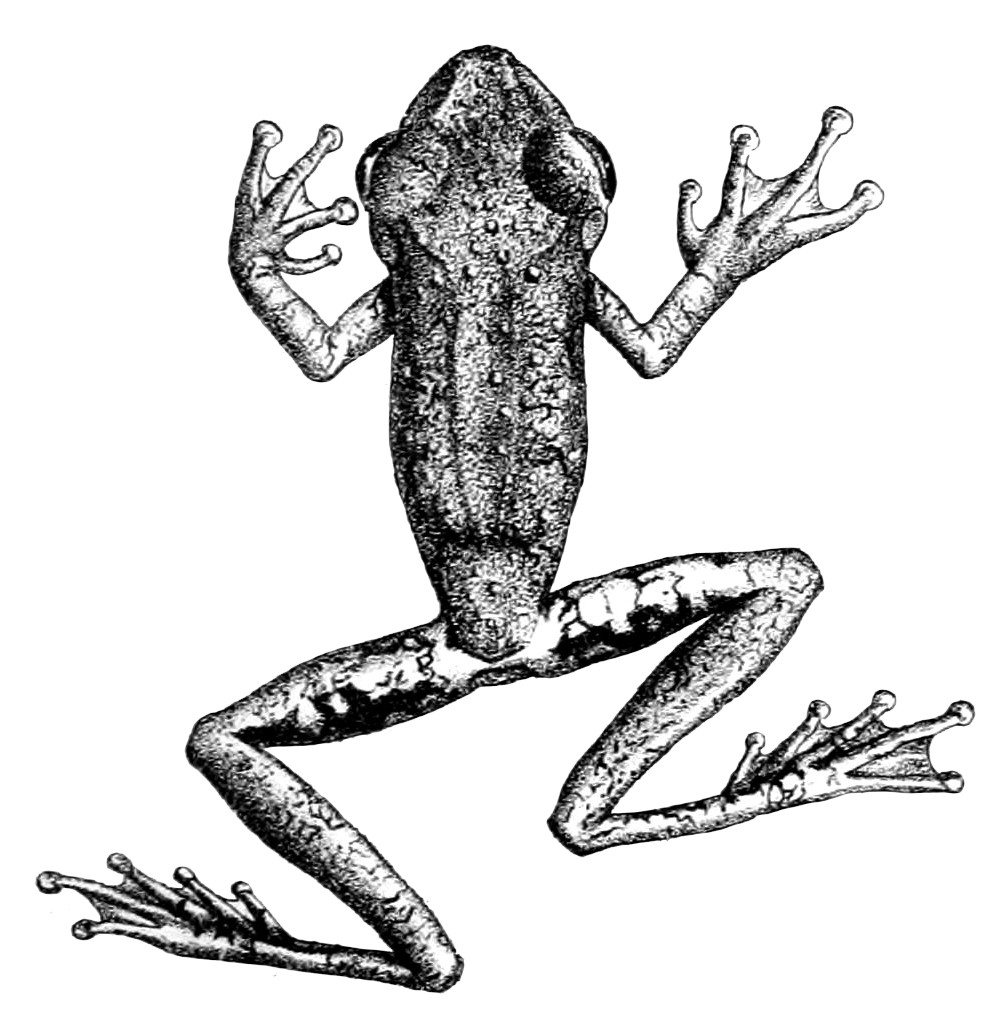

Conservation status
- Data Deficient (IUCN 3.1)

Scientific classification
- Kingdom: Animalia
- Phylum: Chordata
- Class: Amphibia
- Order: Anura
- Family: Hylidae
- Genus: Dryaderces
- Species: D. inframaculata

Binomial name
- Dryaderces inframaculata Boulenger, 1882

Synonyms
- Hyla inframaculata Boulenger, 1882; Osteocephalus inframaculatus (Boulenger, 1882); Dryaderces inframaculatus (Boulenger, 1882)

= Dryaderces inframaculata =

Species of amphibian

Dryaderces inframaculata is a species of frog in the family Hylidae. It is endemic to Brazil and known from between the Tapajós and Xingu Rivers in Pará. Until recently, it was only known from one specimen collected near Santarém, probably around 1876, by Henry Wickham. Common name Santarem treefrog has been coined for it.

== Description ==
Adult males measure 41–48 mm (1.6–1.9 in) and adult females 59–65 mm (2.3–2.6 in) in snout–vent length. The snout is rounded to truncate in dorsal view, and rounded, slightly protruding in lateral profile. The tympanum is large, with its dorsal edge partly concealed by the supra-tympanic fold. The eyes are large and bulging. The fingers are about half-webbed and have large discs. The toes are nearly fully webbed and have discs that are smaller than the fingers ones. The dorsum is light brown to pale grey, with some darker brown or darker grey spots. The belly and throat are white to cream and have black to grey spots. The underside of the limbs is transparent blueish white. The iris is orange with a narrow yellow edge around the pupil, or completely pale golden with black horizontal bars in front and behind the iris and a black vertical bar below it.

== Habitat and conservation ==
Dryaderces inframaculata is known from lowland non-inundated ("terra firme") forest and shallowly inundated forest. Some of the specimens were found in vegetation at night, about 0.2–0.5 m (1–2 ft) above the ground. Reproduction seems to take place in the middle of the rainy season, probably in standing water.

This species is known from two localities. It has not been found in its type locality for 130 years. The other population near the Xingu River is threatened by the Belo Monte Dam—all known collection sites are in the region that is flooded. This species qualifies as "vulnerable", if not "endangered", according to the IUCN Red List criteria.
