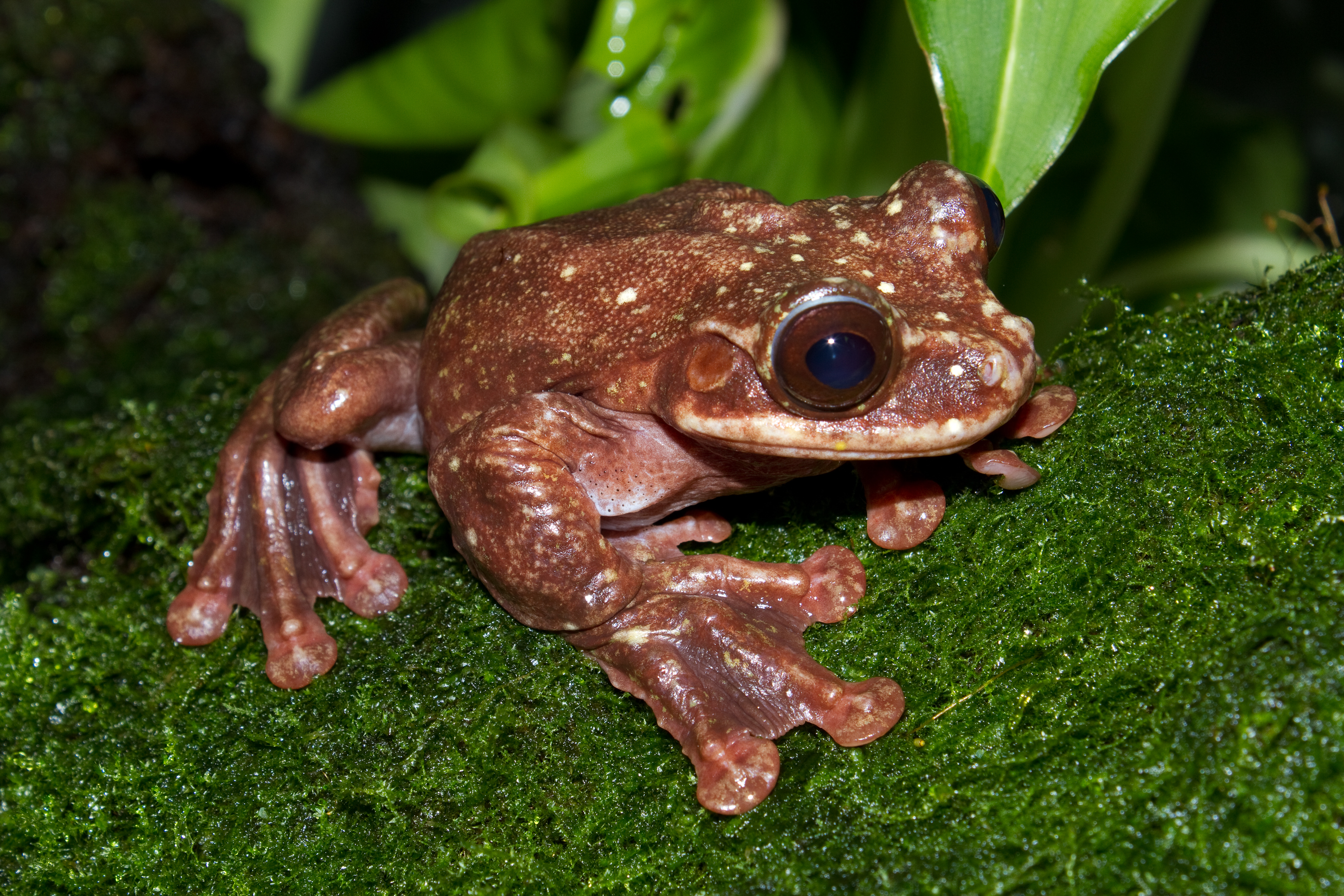
- Ecnomiohyla rabborum

Scientific classification
- Kingdom: Animalia
- Phylum: Chordata
- Class: Amphibia
- Order: Anura
- Family: Hylidae
- Subfamily: Hylinae
- Genus: Ecnomiohyla; Faivovich, Haddad, Garcia, Frost, Campbell, and Wheeler, 2005

Type species
- Ecnomiohyla miliaria Cope, 1886

Species
- See text

= Ecnomiohyla =

Fringe-limbed treefrogs

Genus of amphibians

Ecnomiohyla, commonly known as fringe-limbed treefrogs or marvelous frogs, is a genus of frogs in the family Hylidae. This genus was erected in 2005 following a major revision of Hylidae. The ten original species in this genus (E. rabborum and E. sukia are later discoveries) were previously placed in the genus Hyla. The generic name Ecnomiohyla comes from Greek ecnomios ("marvelous" or "unusual") and Hylas, the companion of Hercules.

== Description ==
Members of Ecnomiohyla are moderately sized to very large frogs with distinctive scalloped fringes of skin on the outer edges of their limbs and relatively immense hands and feet. They are found in the canopies of wet forested highlands of southern Mexico through Central America to Colombia. They are capable of gliding using their webbed hands and feet.

== Species ==
The genus currently includes 12 species,

Binomial name and author	Common name
Ecnomiohyla bailarina Batista, Hertz, Mebert, Köhler, Lotzkat, Ponce, and Vesely, 2014	Golden-eyed fringe-limbed treefrog
Ecnomiohyla echinata (Duellman, 1961)	Oaxacan fringe-limbed treefrog
Ecnomiohyla fimbrimembra (Taylor, 1948)	Heredia treefrog
Ecnomiohyla miliaria (Cope, 1886)	Cope's brown treefrog
Ecnomiohyla minera (Wilson, McCranie, and Williams, 1985)	Guatemala treefrog
Ecnomiohyla phantasmagoria (Dunn, 1943)
Ecnomiohyla rabborum Mendelson, Savage, Griffith, Ross, Kubicki, and Gagliardo, 2008	Rabb's fringe-limbed treefrog (probably extinct, 2016)
Ecnomiohyla salvaje (Wilson, McCranie, and Williams, 1985)	Copan treefrog
Ecnomiohyla sukia Savage & Kubicki, 2010
Ecnomiohyla thysanota (Duellman, 1966)	Cerro Mali treefrog
Ecnomiohyla valancifer (Firschein and Smith, 1956)	San Martin fringe-limbed treefrog
Ecnomiohyla veraguensis Batista, Hertz, Mebert, Köhler, Lotzkat, Ponce, and Vesely, 2014

The AmphibiaWeb lists the same species but also includes Rheohyla miotympanum in this genus.

== See also ==
- Flying frog
