= Ecnomiohyla fimbrimembra =

Conservation status
- Vulnerable (IUCN 3.1)

Scientific classification
- Kingdom: Animalia
- Phylum: Chordata
- Class: Amphibia
- Order: Anura
- Family: Hylidae
- Genus: Ecnomiohyla
- Species: E. fimbrimembra

Binomial name
- Ecnomiohyla fimbrimembra (Taylor, 1948)

Synonyms
- Hyla richardi Taylor, 1948; Hyla richardtaylori Taylor, 1954

Species of frog

Ecnomiohyla fimbrimembra is a species of frog in the family Hylidae. It is found in Costa Rica and Panama. Its natural habitat is subtropical or tropical moist montane forests. It is threatened by habitat loss and the spread of chytridiomycosis.
