= Flying frog =

Frog that can achieve gliding flight

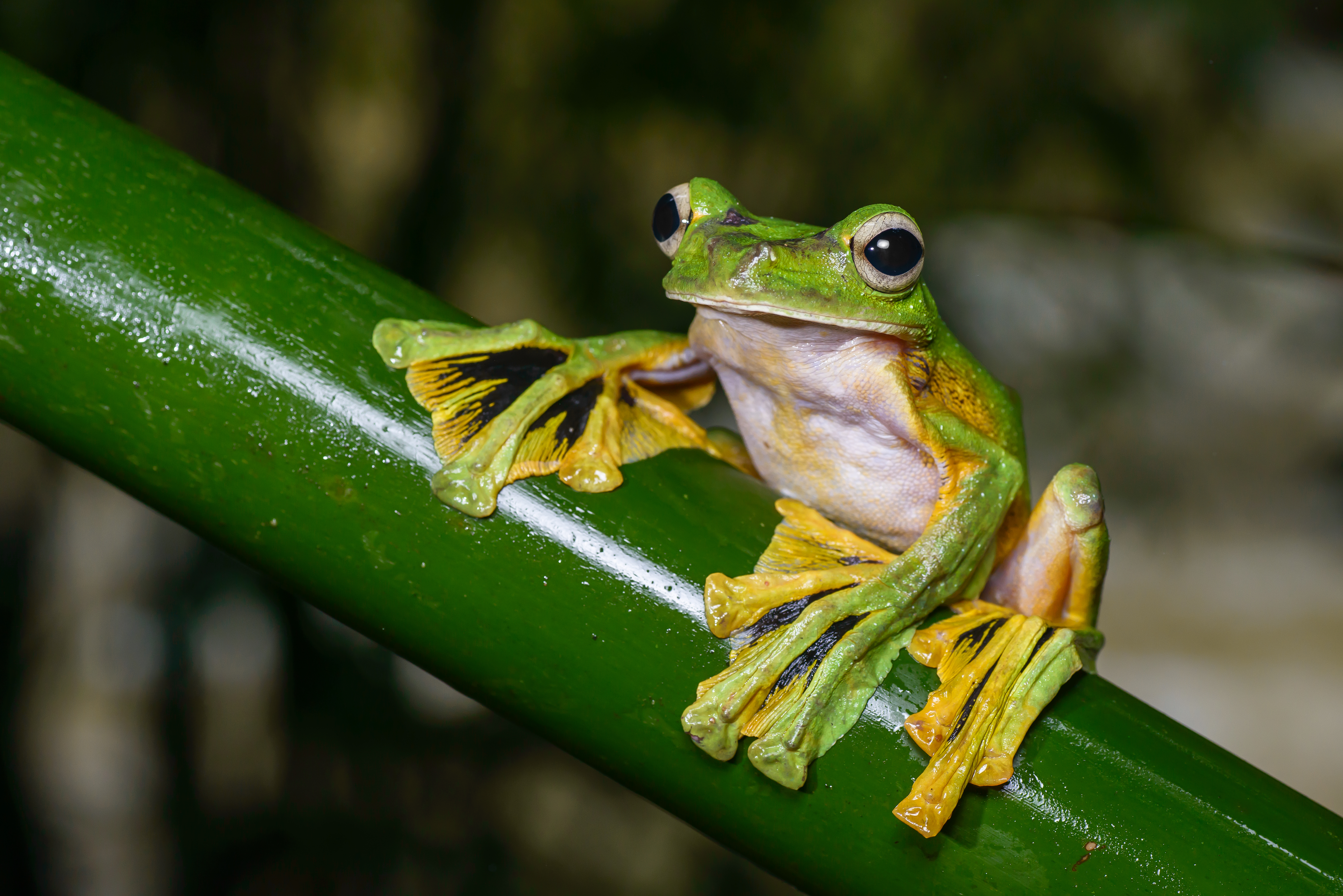
Wallace's flying frog (Rhacophorus nigropalmatus)

A flying frog (also called a gliding frog) is a frog that has the ability to achieve gliding flight. This means it can descend at an angle less than 45° relative to the horizontal. Other nonflying arboreal frogs can also descend, but only at angles greater than 45°, which is referred to as parachuting.

== Evolution ==
Gliding flight has evolved independently several times among frogs from both New World (Hylidae) and Old World (Rhacophoridae) families. This parallel evolution is seen as an adaptation to their life in trees, high above the ground. Characteristics of the Old-World species include "enlarged hands and feet, full webbing between all fingers and toes, lateral skin flaps on the arms and legs, and reduced weight per snout-vent length". These morphological changes contribute to the flying frogs' aerodynamic abilities.

== Taxonomy ==
Alfred Russel Wallace made one of the earliest reports of a flying frog. The species he observed was later described by George Albert Boulenger as Rhacophorus nigropalmatus.

Flying or gliding frogs include members of these genera:

- Agalychnis (Hylidae)
- Ecnomiohyla (Hylidae)
- Polypedates (Rhacophoridae)
- Zhangixalus (Rhacophoridae)

There are 380 species of flying frogs.
