= "Hyla" nicefori =

Conservation status
- Data Deficient (IUCN 3.1)

Scientific classification
- Kingdom: Animalia
- Phylum: Chordata
- Class: Amphibia
- Order: Anura
- Family: Hylidae
- Subfamily: Hylinae
- Genus: "Hyla"
- Species: "H." nicefori

Binomial name
- "Hyla" nicefori (Cochran & Goin, 1970)

Synonyms
- Cryptobatrachus nicefori Cochran & Goin, 1970; "|" Infante-Rivero, Rojas-Runjaic, and Barrio-Amorós, 2009

Species of frog

"Hyla" nicefori, also known as the Colombian backpack frog, is a species of frog in the family Hylidae. It is endemic to the border region between Boyacá and Casanare in Colombia and only known from the holotype. The name format, as used by the American Museum of Natural History's Amphibian Species of the World, indicates that while this species is temporarily kept in the hylid type genus Hyla, it belongs elsewhere in the family and will be reassigned pending a taxonomic resolution. It was originally placed in Cryptobatrachus (backpack frogs), but a later study revealed a number morphological differences showing that it is not in family Hemiphractidae (the family of Cryptobatrachus), instead pointing to it being a hylid frog, perhaps Hyloscirtus.

The only known record of the species is the type specimen that was collected in the 1940s and "Hyla" nicefori is rated as data deficient by the IUCN. There has been extensive habitat loss at the type locality, but habitat remains nearby. There have been no recent surveys for frogs in the region because of security problems, although (as of 2017) there were plans of a revisit.
