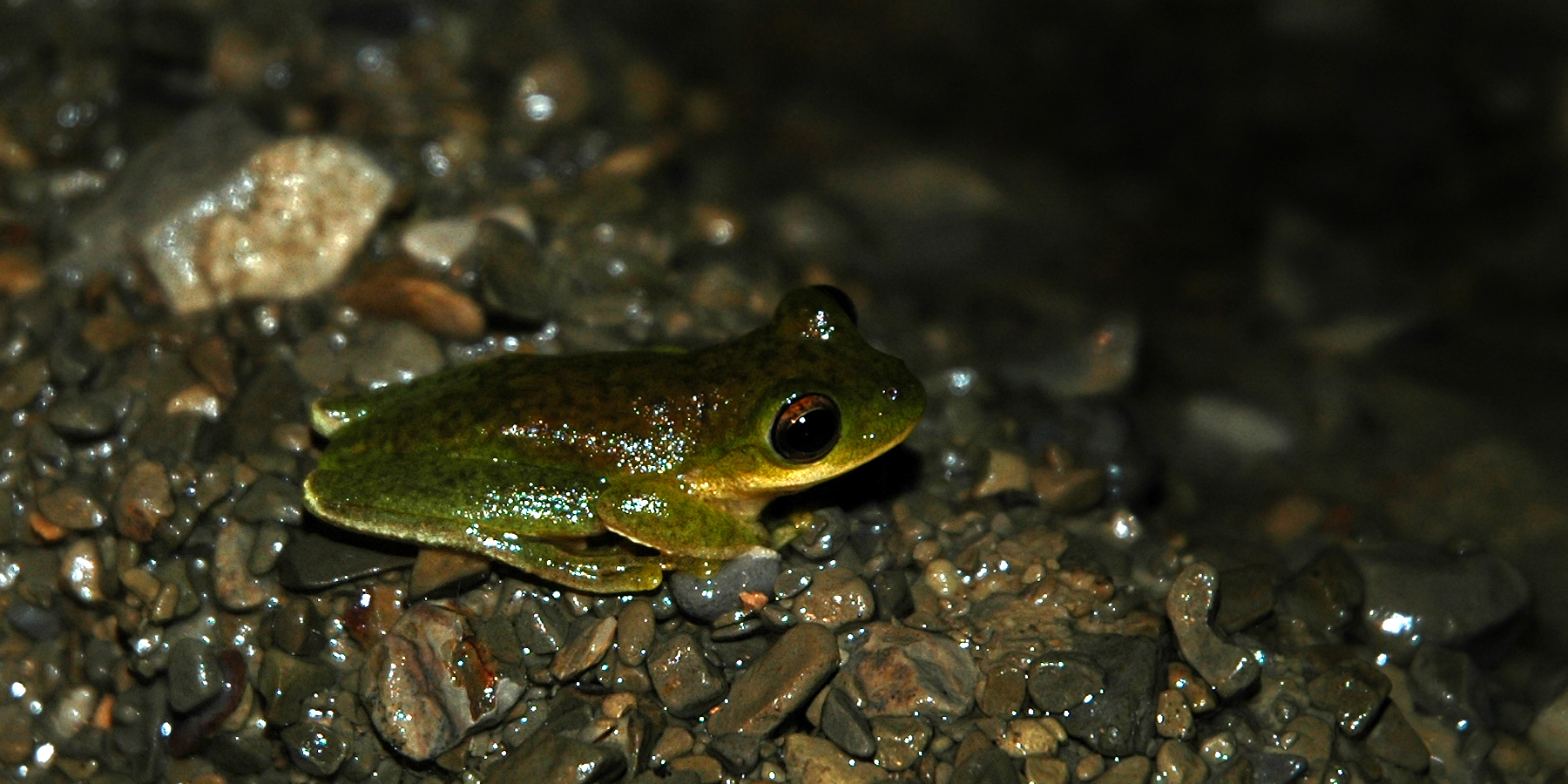

Conservation status
- Least Concern (IUCN 3.1)

Scientific classification
- Kingdom: Animalia
- Phylum: Chordata
- Class: Amphibia
- Order: Anura
- Family: Hylidae
- Subfamily: Hylinae
- Genus: Rheohyla; Duellman, Marion, and Hedges, 2016
- Species: R. miotympanum

Binomial name
- Rheohyla miotympanum (Cope, 1863)

Synonyms
- Hyla miotympanum Cope, 1863 (type species); Hyla microtis Peters, 1870 "1869"; Hyla darlingi Smith, Smith, and Werler, 1952; Ecnomiohyla miotympanum (Cope, 1863)

= Rheohyla =

Genus of amphibians

Rheohyla is a genus of frogs in the family Hylidae. As currently recognized, it is monotypic, containing only Rheohyla miotympanum, also known as the small-eared hyla or small-eared treefrog. However, the nominal species likely is a complex of more than one species. It is endemic to eastern and central Mexico. The generic name refers to streams, the breeding habitat of this frog (from Greek rheos meaning 'stream' combined with Hylas). The specific name is derived from Greek meion, a diminutive prefix, together with Greek tympanon (='drum') and refers to the small tympanum.

== Taxonomy ==
This genus was erected in 2016 to accommodate former Ecnomiohyla miotympanum; AmphibiaWeb still uses this earlier classification. Faivovich and colleagues argued in 2018 that splitting Rheohyla miotympanum from Ecnomiohyla was not necessary on the grounds of obtaining monophyletic Ecnomiohyla, but is nevertheless convenient because it allows associating Ecnomiohyla with several putative phenotypic synapomorphies, which Rheohyla miotympanum lacks. There is no phenotypic autapomorphy defining Rheohyla.

== Description ==
Males can grow up to 38 mm (1.5 in) and females to 51 mm (2.0 in) in snout–vent length. The tympanum is distinct but dorsally obscured by the well-develop supratympanic fold. The fingers are about one-third webbed while the toes are about three-fourths webbed. Dorsal skin is smooth. Coloration is dorsally pale green and ventrally creamy white. The tadpoles have a relatively small oral disc.

== Habitat and conservation ==
Rheohyla miotympanum inhabits a variety of habitats and vegetation zones in the Sierra Madre Oriental, Sierra Madre de Oaxaca, and Sierra de los Tuxtlas at elevations of 350–2,000 m (1,150–6,560 ft) above sea level. It is often associated with bromeliads or elephant-ear plants, but can also be found on the ground, in bushes, or on small plants. Reproduction takes place in streams and ponds, in contrast to Ecnomiohyla that breed in tree holes and Charadrahyla, Plectrohyla, and Sarcohyla that breed in cascading streams. Amplexus between Rheohyla miotympanum and Charadrahyla taeniopus has nevertheless been observed.

Rheohyla miotympanum is a fairly common species. Although the overall population is estimated to be stable, this species is facing some threats, most importantly habitat loss and degradation caused by small-scale agricultural development and logging. Other potential threats are collecting for human consumption, pet trade, chytridiomycosis, and pesticides. Its range includes several protected areas.
