= Mimic tree frog =

Conservation status
- Data Deficient (IUCN 3.1)

Scientific classification
- Kingdom: Animalia
- Phylum: Chordata
- Class: Amphibia
- Order: Anura
- Family: Hylidae
- Subfamily: Hylinae
- Genus: "Hyla"
- Species: "H." imitator

Binomial name
- "Hyla" imitator (Barbour & Dunn, 1921)

Synonyms
- Paludicola imitator Barbour & Dunn, 1921; Hyla imitator Parker, 1927

Species of amphibian

The mimic tree frog ("Hyla" imitator) is a species of frog in the family Hylidae that is endemic to the central Amazon of Brazil. The species is virtually unknown. The genus format, as used by the American Museum of Natural History's Amphibian Species of the World, indicates that while this species's name currently starts with "Hyla", it belongs elsewhere and will be renamed pending a taxonomic resolution.
