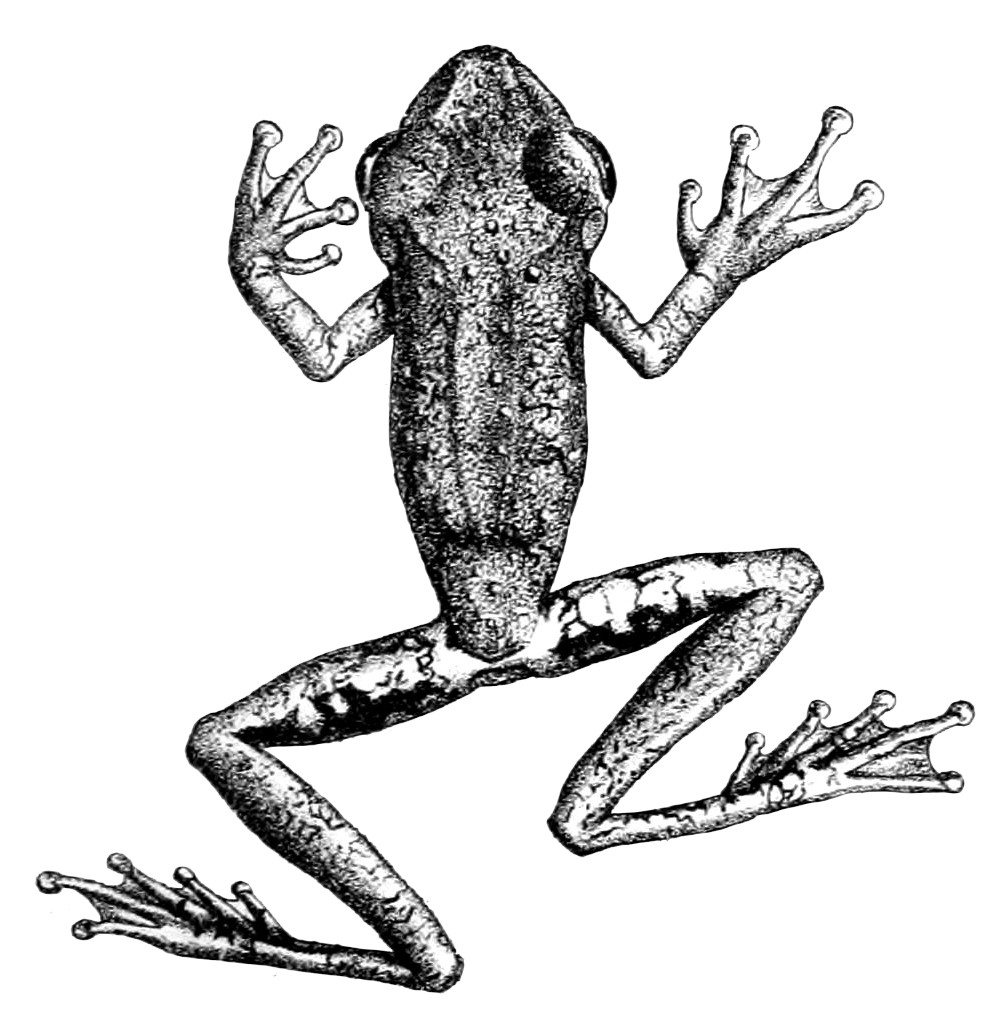
- Dryaderces inframaculata

Scientific classification
- Kingdom: Animalia
- Phylum: Chordata
- Class: Amphibia
- Order: Anura
- Family: Hylidae
- Subfamily: Lophyohylinae
- Genus: Dryaderces; Jungfer et al., 2013

Type species
- Hyla pearsoni Gaige, 1929

Species
- 2 species (see text)

= Dryaderces =

Genus of amphibians

Dryaderces is a small genus of frogs in the family Hylidae. Their known distribution is disjunct, with one species found in the upper Amazon Basin and lower Andean slopes between central Peru and Amazonian Bolivia, and another one in Pará, Brazil. Its sister taxon is Osteocephalus. No phenotypic synapomorphies defining the genus are known.

== Etymology ==
The generic name Dryaderces is derived from Ancient Greek dryad (=tree) and aderces (=unseen, invisible), thus meaning "unseen in a tree".

== Description ==
Dryaderces are medium-sized frogs; adult males can grow to 50 mm (2.0 in) and adult females to 68 mm (2.7 in) in snout–vent length. They are pond breeders. Males have only scattered, non-spinous tubercles on the dorsum (pond-breeding Osteocephalus have heavily tuberculate dorsum, with the tips of the tubercles keratinized). Females have smoother backs. Juvenile coloration resembles adult coloration (different in Osteocephalus).

== Species ==
There are two species:

- Dryaderces inframaculata (Boulenger, 1882)
- Dryaderces pearsoni (Gaige, 1929)

Before Dryaderces was erected, these two species were placed in Osteocephalus. There is at least one undescribed species belonging to this genus.
