= National Conference on Science, Policy and the Environment =

The National Council for Science and the Environment (NCSE) is an annual conference that brings together over 1,000 scientific, educational, business, civil society, and government professionals from diverse fields to explore the connections between science and decision-making associated with important environmental issues.

As part of the conference, NCSE also holds the annual John H. Chafee Memorial Lecture on Science and the Environment. The lecture provides a high-profile forum for communicating the importance and potential for science in environmental decision-making by featuring a renowned expert in that particular field. At the conference, participants develop policy recommendations and strategies to achieve science-based solutions to complex environmental problems. Following the conference, NCSE:

1. Produces and disseminates conference recommendations developed by participants
2. Provides briefings to Congress, other institutions, and decision-makers capable of implementing the conference recommendations
3. Strives to develop or facilitate the development of new programs based on recommendations from the conference
4. Publishes the John H. Chafee Memorial Lecture.

== Goals for the National Conference ==
1. Embrace a “solutions” focus for the meeting and its products
2. Select conference topics that are major challenges to the entire world and to which science can contribute significantly toward solutions.
3. Provide participants a rich “how-to” experience in the integration of environmental science and policy to develop solutions for major environmental challenges facing society.
4. Increase the number and diversity of participants at the conference.
5. Build on the meeting results in the other NCSE programs
6. Integrate Affiliate universities and colleges into the meeting more broadly and encourage them to become a larger part of the implementation of the plans
7. Utilize the conference to broaden the network of supporters of NCSE and its programs.

List of Conferences
14th	Building Climate Solutions
13th	Disasters and Environment: Science Preparedness and Resilience
12th	Environment and Security
11th	Our Changing Oceans
10th	The New Green Economy
9th	Biodiversity in the Rapidly Changing World
8th	Climate Change: Science and Solutions
7th	Integrating Environment and Human Health
6th	Energy for a Sustainable and Secure Future
5th	Forecasting Environmental Changes
4th	Water for a Sustainable and Secure Future
3rd	Education for a Sustainable and Secure Future
2nd	Sustainable Communities: Science & Solutions
1st	Improving the Scientific Basis for Environmental Decisionmaking
Future Conferences	Sustainable Cities
