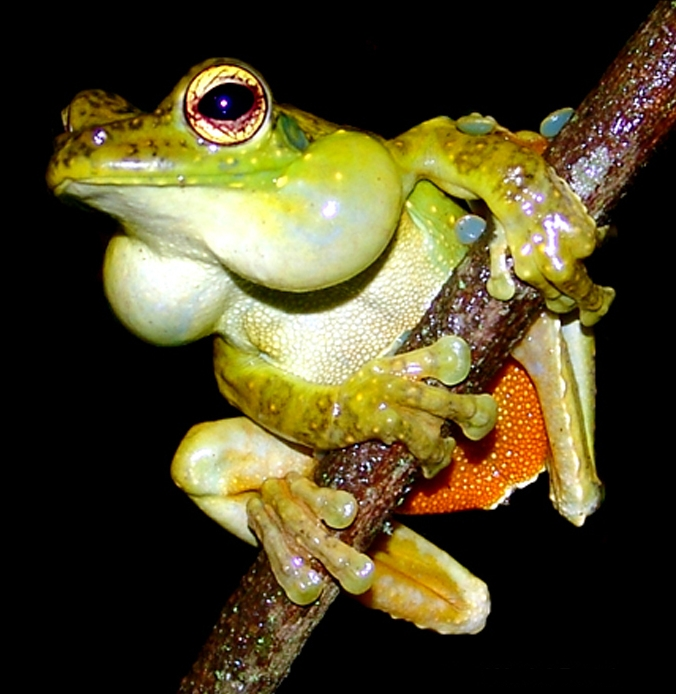

Conservation status
- Least Concern (IUCN 3.1)

Scientific classification
- Kingdom: Animalia
- Phylum: Chordata
- Class: Amphibia
- Order: Anura
- Family: Hylidae
- Subfamily: Lophyohylinae
- Genus: Itapotihyla; Faivovich, Haddad, Garcia, Frost, Campbell, and Wheeler, 2005
- Species: I. langsdorffii

Binomial name
- Itapotihyla langsdorffii (Duméril & Bibron, 1841)

Synonyms
- Hyla langsdorffii Duméril and Bibron, 1841

= Itapotihyla =

Genus of amphibians

Itapotihyla is a genus of frogs in the family Hylidae. It is monotypic, being represented by the single species Itapotihyla langsdorffii, commonly known as the ocellated treefrog. It is found in the Atlantic Forest biome of Brazil, with an isolated population in eastern Paraguay and adjacent Brazil and northeastern Argentina.

== Description ==
Itapotihyla langsdorffii are relatively large treefrogs. They show sexual dimorphism, with females (mean snout–vent length 103 mm (4.1 in)) being larger than males (81 mm (3.2 in)).

== Reproduction ==
Reproduction takes place in temporary and permanent pools inside rainforest. It is an explosive breeder with a mean brood size of over 6000 eggs. Breeding is associated with intense vocalization by males. In addition to vocalization, male–male interactions may involve grabbing and pushing and even direct physical combat. This kind of behaviour is more common in species where males are larger than females (see sexual selection in frogs).

== Trophic interactions ==
Its diet mainly consists of arthropods (in particular grasshoppers and crickets), but also vertebrate remains (other frogs including Physalaemus crombiei and Scinax argyreornatus as well as unidentified bird feathers) can be found in their stomach contents. These frogs themselves may be preyed upon by Chironius bicarinatus, a colubrid snake.

== Habitat and conservation ==
Itapotihyla langsdorffii is an arboreal frog occurring on shrubs and trees inside rainforest. It is restricted to pristine habitats. Itapotihyla langsdorffii is locally abundant in suitable habitats in Brazil. The Paraguayan population is assumed to be in decline because of habitat loss and possibly seriously threatened; however, at the species level it is not considered threatened.
