= Nesorohyla =

Conservation status
- Endangered (IUCN 3.1)

Scientific classification
- Kingdom: Animalia
- Phylum: Chordata
- Class: Amphibia
- Order: Anura
- Family: Hylidae
- Tribe: Cophomantini
- Genus: Nesorohyla; Pinheiro, Kok, Noonan, Means, & Haddad, 2018
- Species: N. kanaima

Binomial name
- Nesorohyla kanaima (Goin & Woodley, 1969)

Synonyms
- Hyla kanaima Goin & Woodley, 1969; Myersiohyla kanaima (Goin & Woodley, 1969); Nesorohyla kanaima (Goin & Woodley, 1969)

Genus of amphibians

Nesorohyla is a monotypic genus of frogs in the family Hylidae. The sole species is Nesorohyla kanaima, also known as the Kanaima treefrog. It is endemic to Guyana. and possibly Brazil and Venezuela. Its natural habitats are subtropical or tropical moist lowland forests, subtropical or tropical moist montane forests, and rivers.
