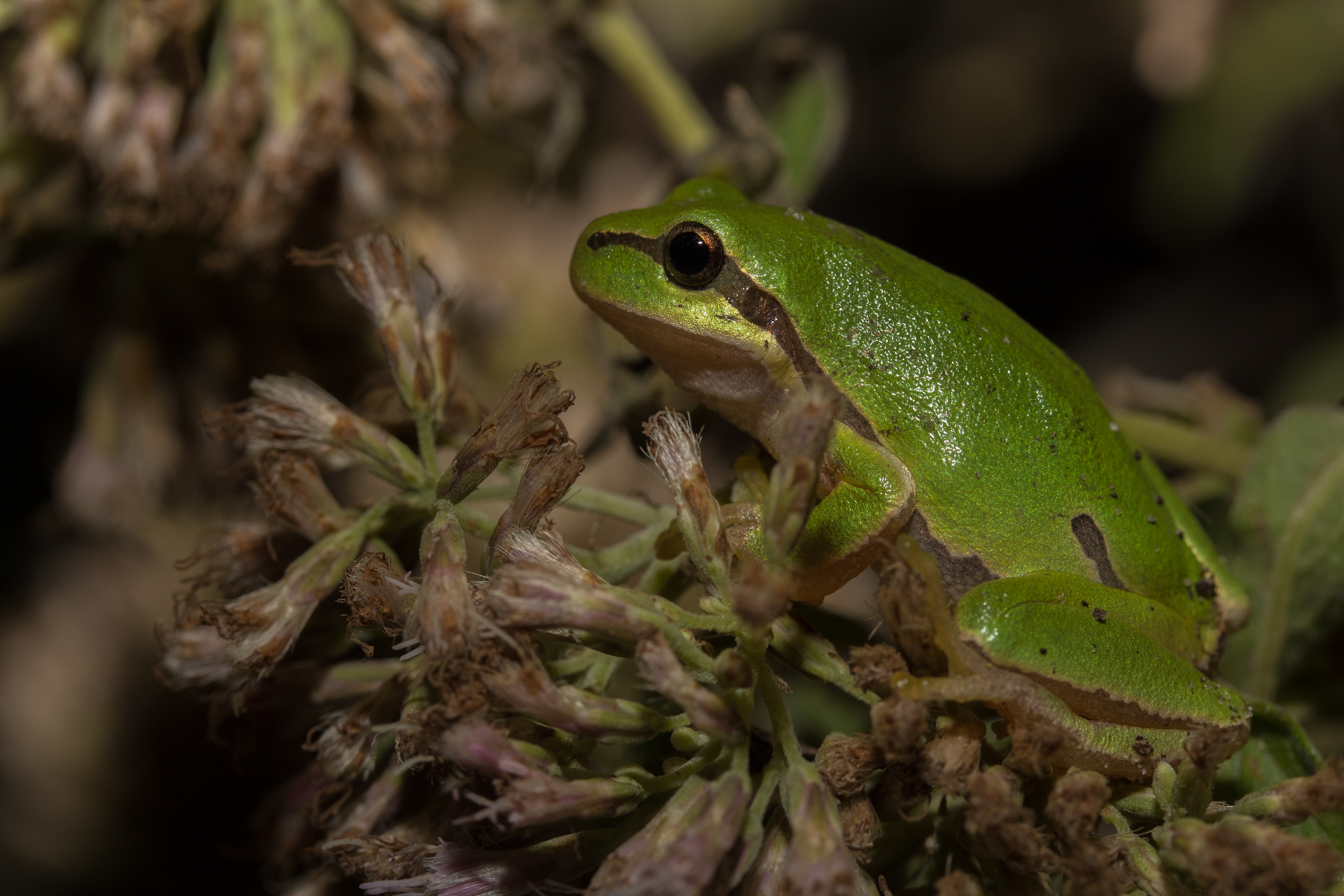

Conservation status
- Least Concern (IUCN 3.1)

Scientific classification
- Kingdom: Animalia
- Phylum: Chordata
- Class: Amphibia
- Order: Anura
- Family: Hylidae
- Genus: Hyla
- Species: H. arborea

Binomial name
- Hyla arborea (Linnaeus, 1758)
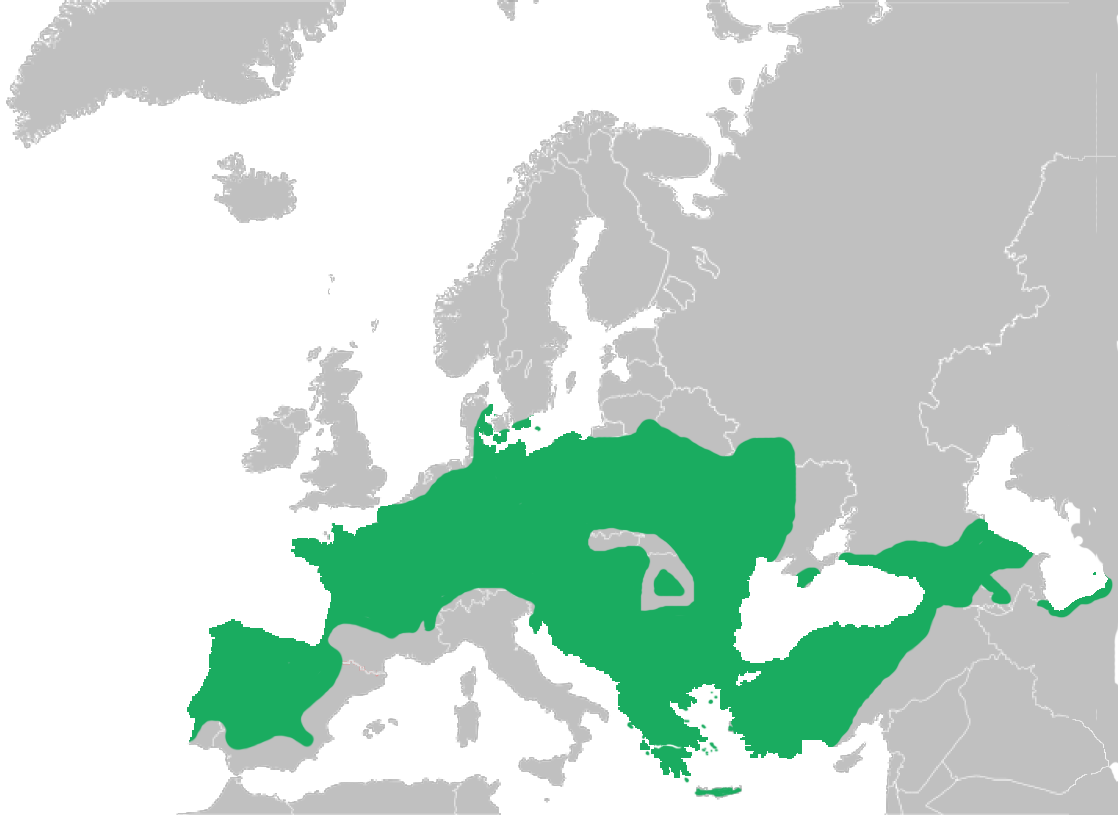
- Range as defined by the IUCN in 2009. Some populations (Iberian Peninsula, parts of Eastern Europe, Turkey, and the Black Sea and Caspian Sea regions) are now recognized as separate species

Synonyms
- Hyla viridis Laurenti, 1768; Rana arborea Linnaeus, 1758; Rana hyla Linnaeus, 1758

Audio

= European tree frog =

Species of amphibian

The European tree frog (Hyla arborea) is a small tree frog. As traditionally defined, it was found throughout much of Europe, Asia and northern Africa, but based on molecular genetic and other data several populations formerly included in it are now recognized as separate species (for example, H. intermedia of Italy and nearby, H. molleri of the Iberian Peninsula, H. meridionalis of parts of southwestern Europe and northern Africa, and H. orientalis of parts of Eastern Europe, Turkey and the Black Sea and Caspian Sea regions), limiting the true European tree frog to Europe from France to Poland and Greece.

== Description ==
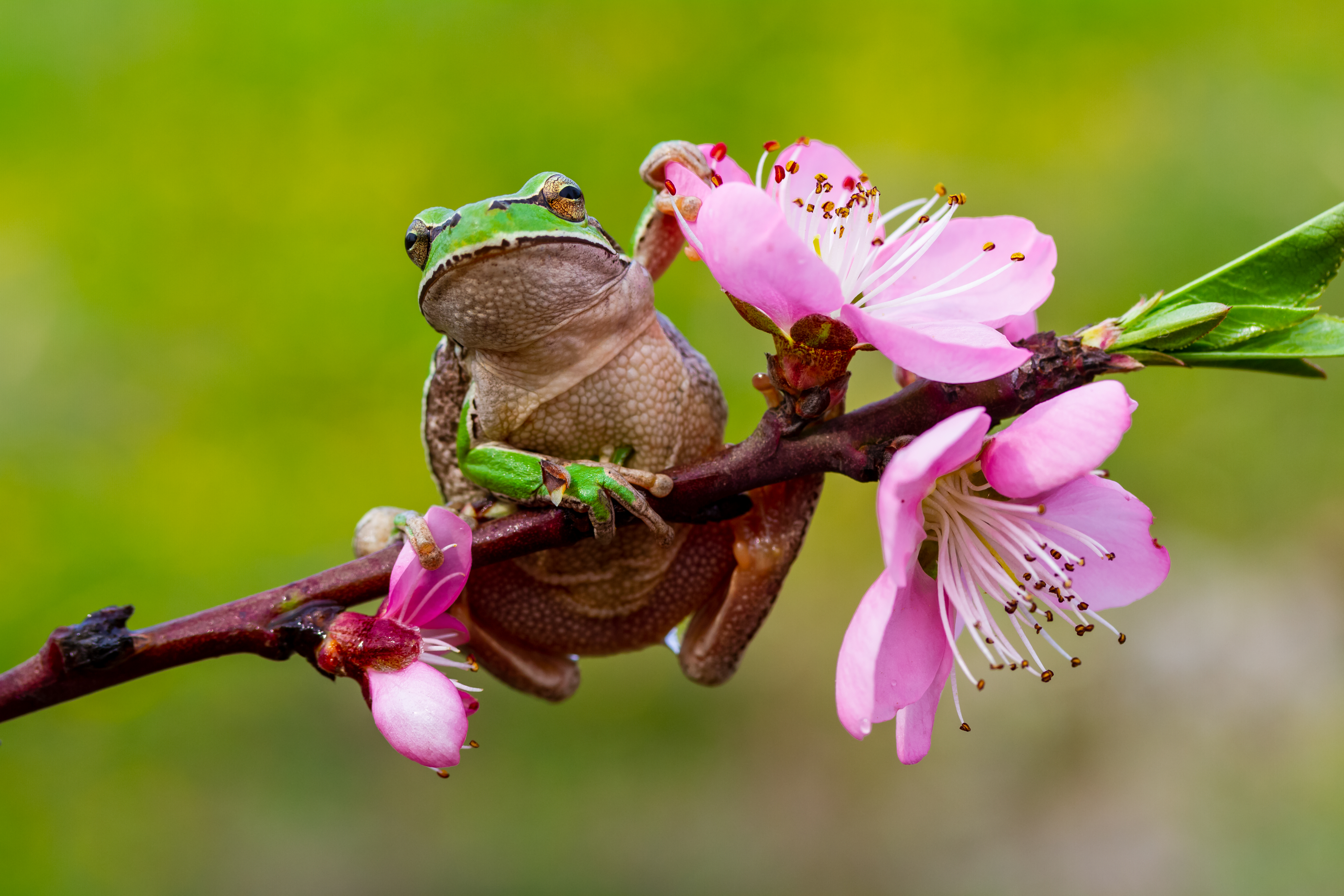
European tree frog (Hyla arborea) in Kapıçam National Park, Kahramanmaraş

European tree frogs are small; males range from 32–43 mm (1.3–1.7 in) in length, and females range from 40–50 mm (1.6–2.0 in) in length. They are slender, with long legs. Their dorsal skin is smooth, while their ventral skin is granular. Their dorsal skin can be green, gray, or tan depending on the temperature, humidity, or their mood. Their ventral skin is a whitish color, and the dorsal and ventral skin is separated by a dark brown lateral stripe from the eyes to the groin. Females have white throats, while males have golden brown throats with large (folded) vocal sacs. The head of H. arborea is rounded, the lip drops strongly, the pupil has the shape of a horizontal ellipse, and the tympanum is clearly recognizable. The discs on the frog's toes, which it uses to climb trees and hedges, is a characteristic feature of H. arborea. Like other frogs, their hind legs are much larger and stronger than the fore legs, enabling the frogs to jump rapidly.

== Distribution and habitat ==
Members of the H. arborea species complex are the only representatives of the widespread tree frog family (Hylidae) indigenous to mainland Europe. and are found across most of Europe (except United Kingdom), northwest Africa, and temperate Asia to Japan. This species complex is native to Albania, Armenia, Austria, Azerbaijan, Belarus, Belgium, Bosnia and Herzegovina, Bulgaria, Croatia, Cyprus, the Czech Republic, Denmark, France, Georgia, Germany, Greece, Hungary, Jordan, Italy, Latvia, Liechtenstein, Lithuania; Luxembourg, North Macedonia, the Republic of, Moldova, Montenegro, the Netherlands, Poland, Portugal, Romania, Russia, Serbia, Slovakia, Slovenia, Sweden, Switzerland, Turkey, and Ukraine.

In the United Kingdom, the species status is legally classed as non-native. It has been introduced, and now thought to be extinct.

European tree frogs can be found in marshlands, damp meadows, reed beds, parks, gardens, vineyards, orchards, stream banks, lake shores, or humid or dry forests. They tend to avoid dark or thick forests, and they are able to tolerate some periods of dryness; therefore, sometimes they are found in dry habitats.

== Behavior ==
- Historically, tree frogs were used as barometers because they respond to approaching rain by croaking.
- Depending on subspecies, temperature, humidity, and the frog's 'mood', skin colour ranges from bright to olive green, grey, brown and yellow.
- European tree frogs eat a variety of small arthropods, such as spiders, flies, beetles, butterflies, and smooth caterpillars. Their ability to take long leaps allows them to catch fast-flying insects, which make up most of their diets.
- They hibernate in walls, cellars, under rocks, under clumps of vegetation, or buried in leaf piles or manure piles.

== Reproduction ==
Calling males at night

European tree frogs reproduce in stagnant bodies of water, such as lakes, ponds, swamps, reservoirs, and sometimes puddles, from late March to June. They croak in the breeding season, even when migrating to their mating pools or ponds. Males will often change breeding ponds, even within the same breeding season. After a spring rain, the males will call females from low vegetation or shallow ponds. About 800 to 1000 eggs are laid in clumps the size of a walnut. Individual eggs are about 1.5 mm in diameter. After 10–14 days, the eggs hatch. Then, after three months, tadpoles metamorphose into frogs. Metamorphosis usually peaks from late July to early August. They are able to live for up to 15 years.

== Conservation status ==
According to the IUCN Red List of Endangered Species, H. arborea is "listed as Least Concern in view of its wide distribution, presumed large population, and because it is unlikely to be declining fast enough to qualify for listing in a more threatened category." However, according to the IUCN, the population trend of H. arborea is decreasing.

Some of the main threats to European tree frogs include habitat fragmentation and destruction, pollution of wetlands, predation from fish, capture for the pet trade, and climate change. Besides these main threats, other possible reasons for the decline in their populations include increased UVB radiation and local and far-ranging pesticides, fertilizers, and pollutants. Trout have been observed preying on European tree frogs, and in Europe, trout introduced into a pond result in a significant decline in their population.

While H. arborea is sensitive to habitat fragmentation, habitat restoration (beginning in the 1980s) has been successful to increase populations. Besides habitat restoration, other attempts to increase population have included building of new breeding ponds, creation of "habitat corridors to connect breeding sites", and reintroductions. This has been successful in Sweden, Latvia, and Denmark. Habitat protection has been shown to be the most important approach to conserving European tree frog populations.

== Gallery ==
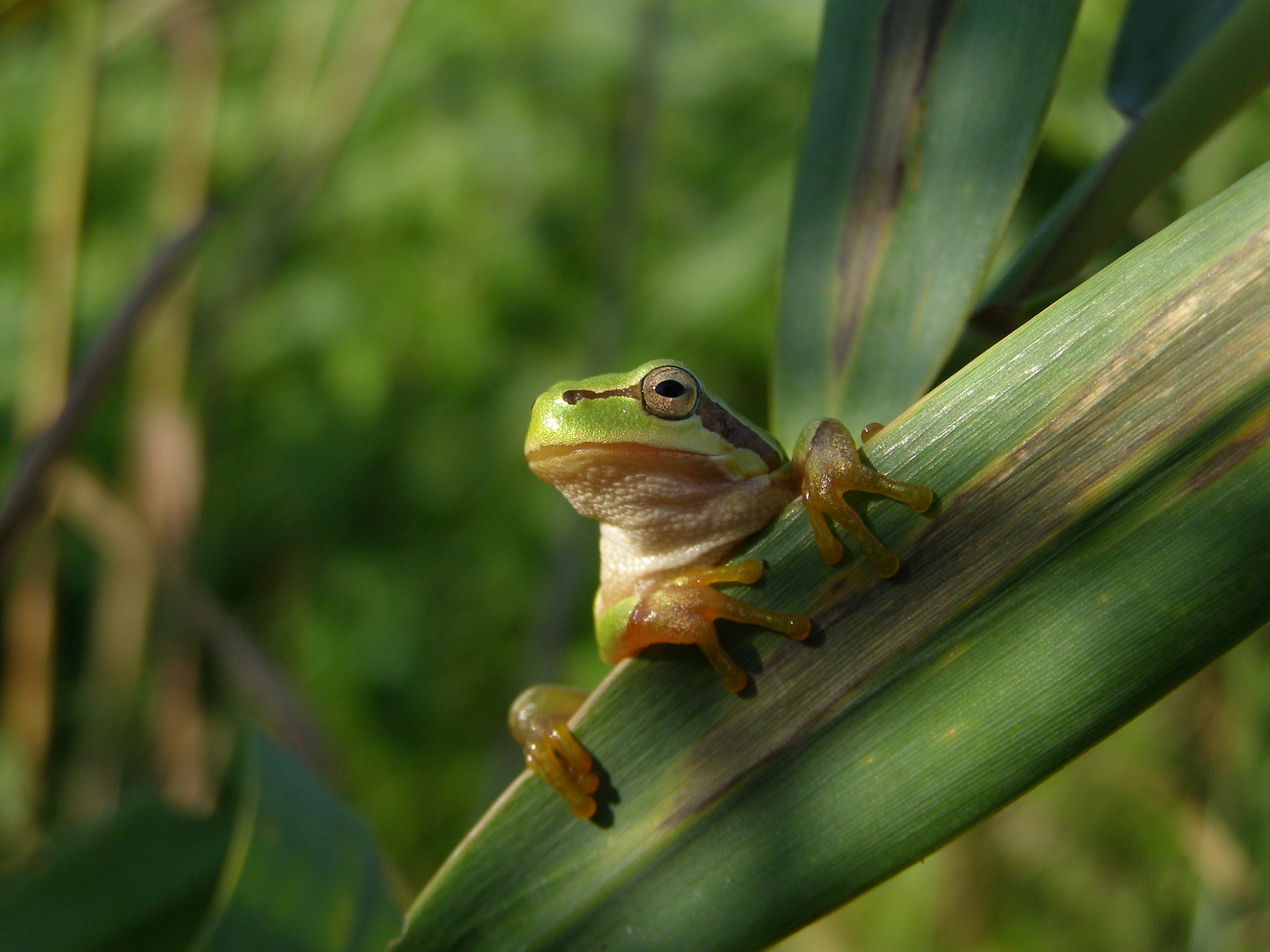

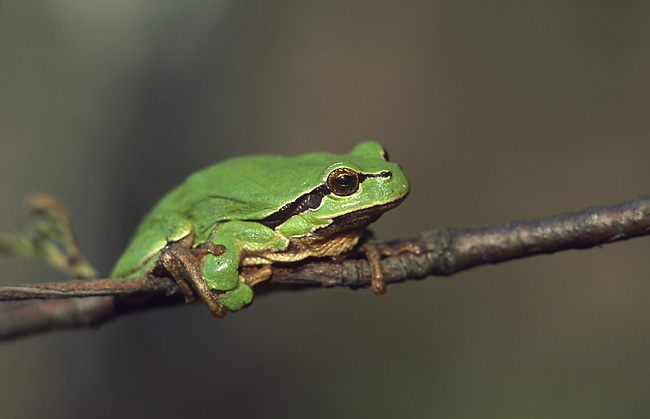

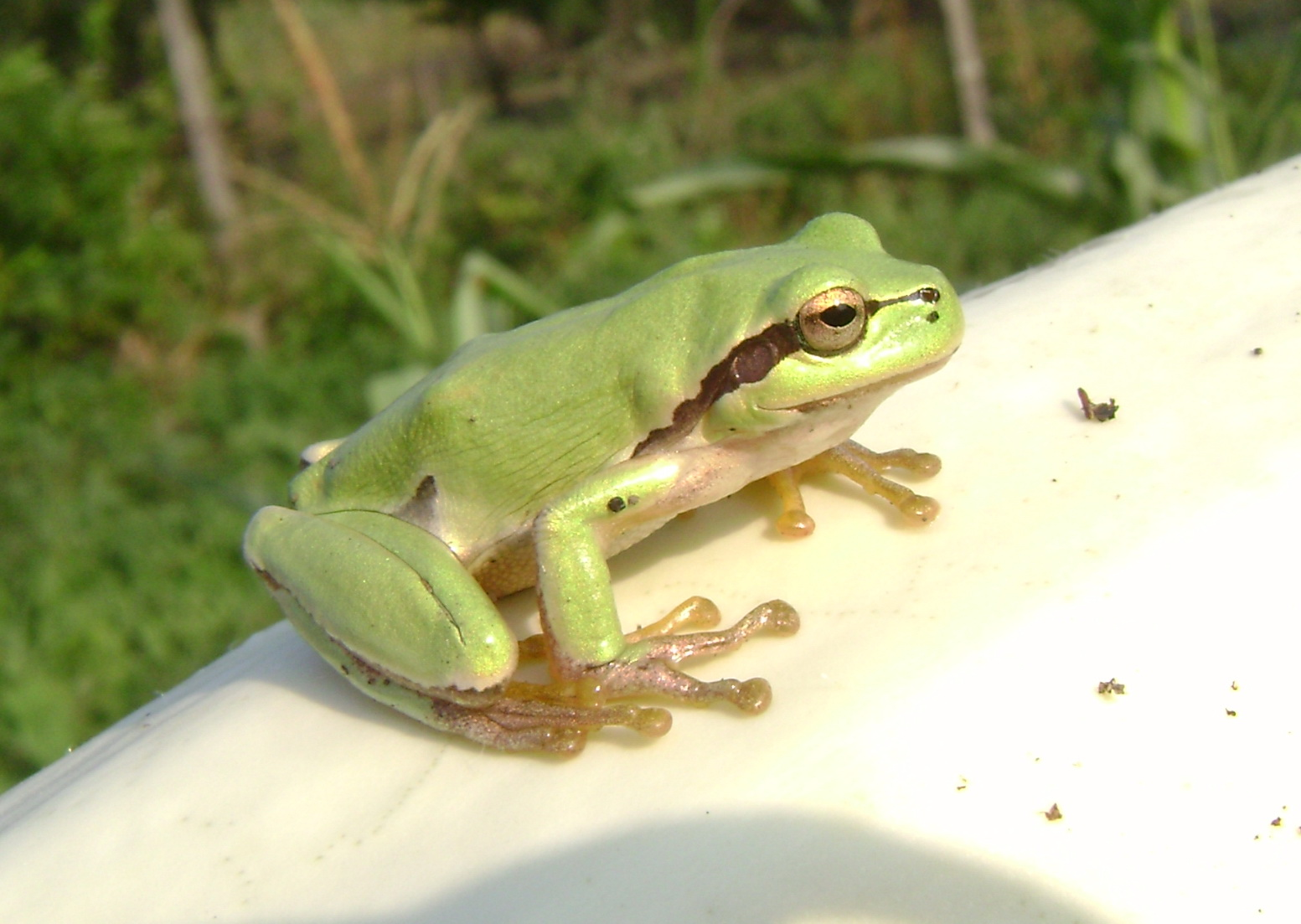

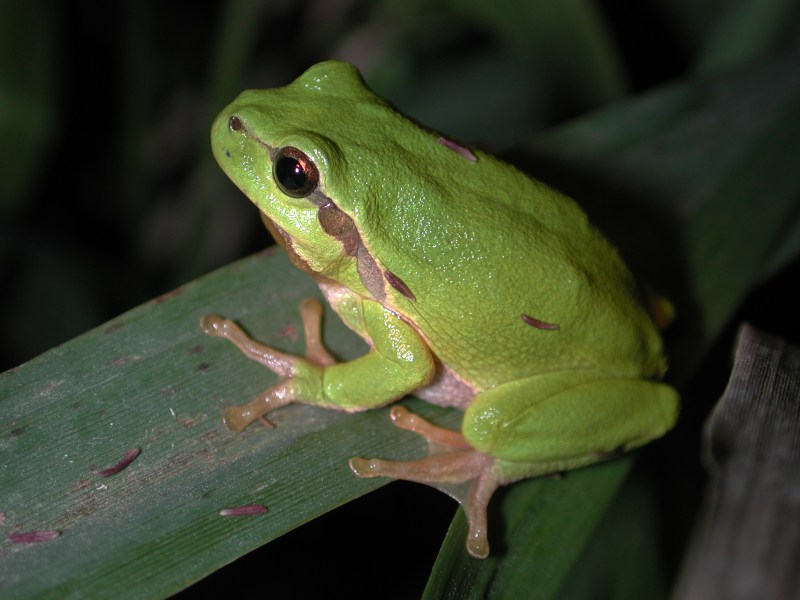

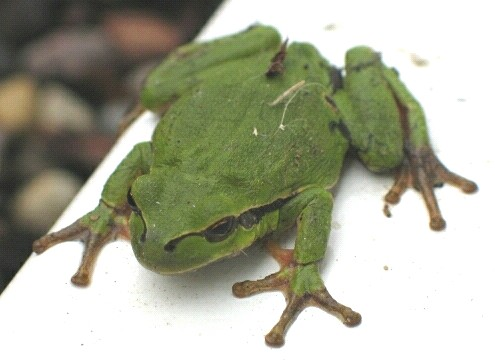

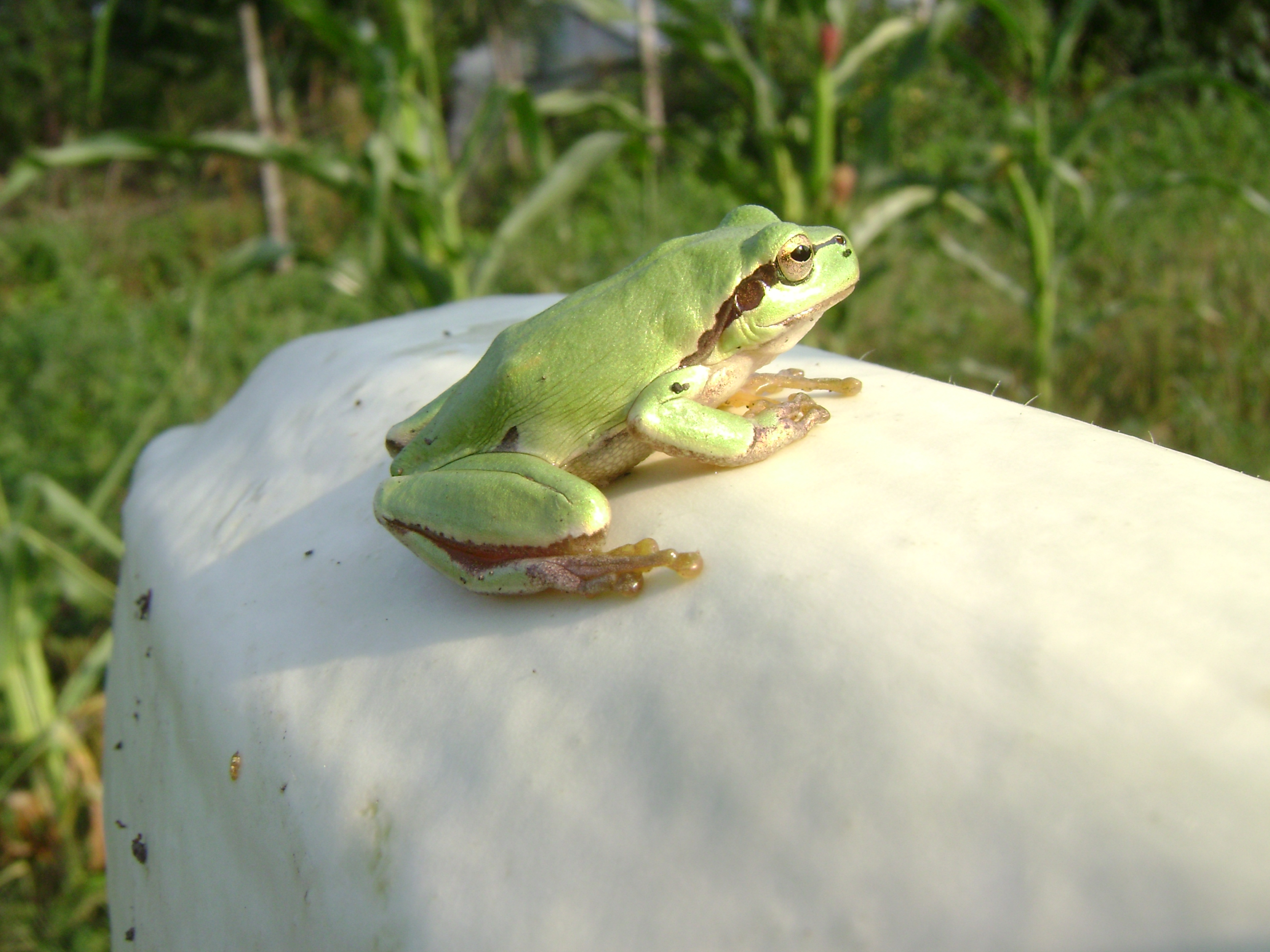

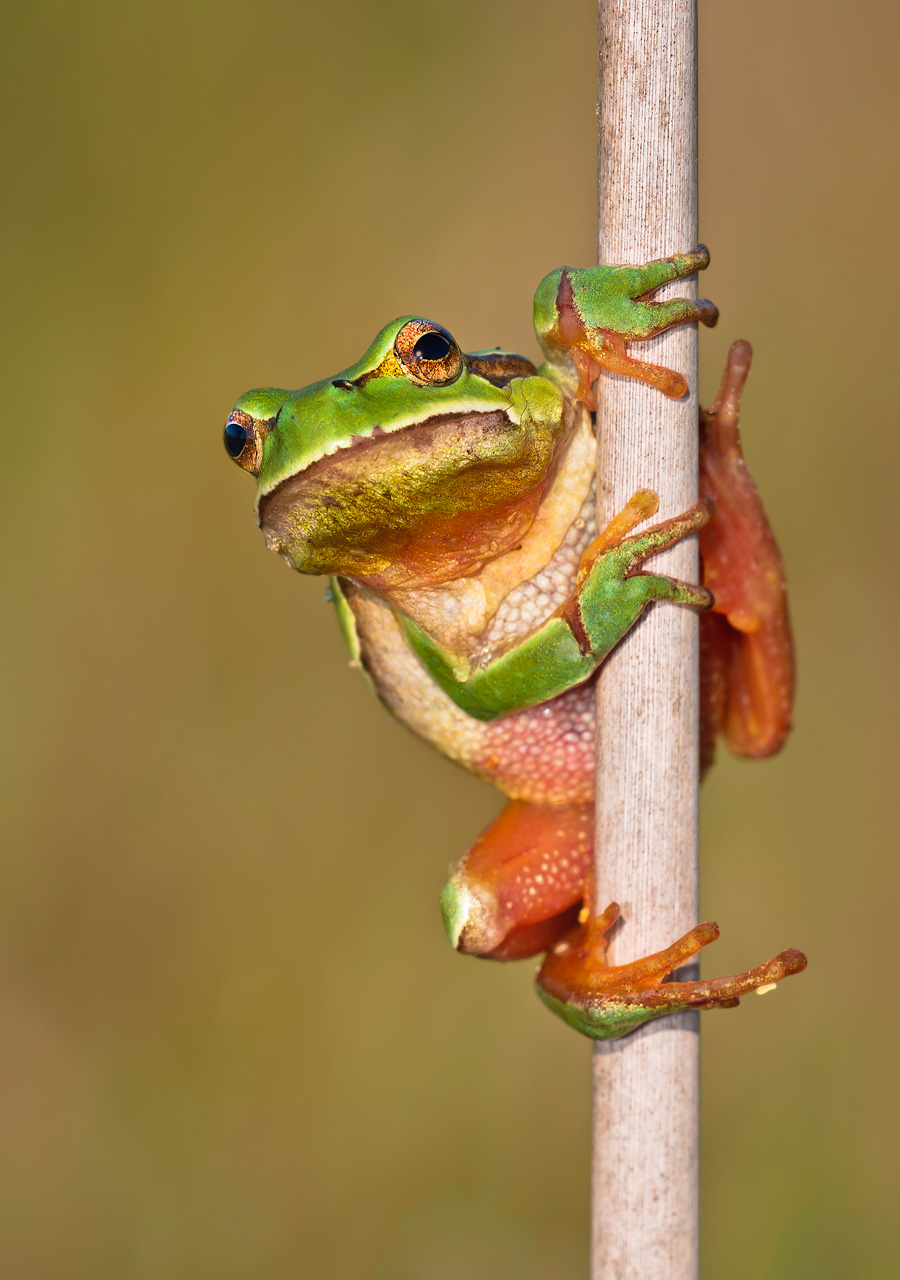
Formerly included in the European tree frog, the form molleri is now recognized as its own species, the Iberian tree frog

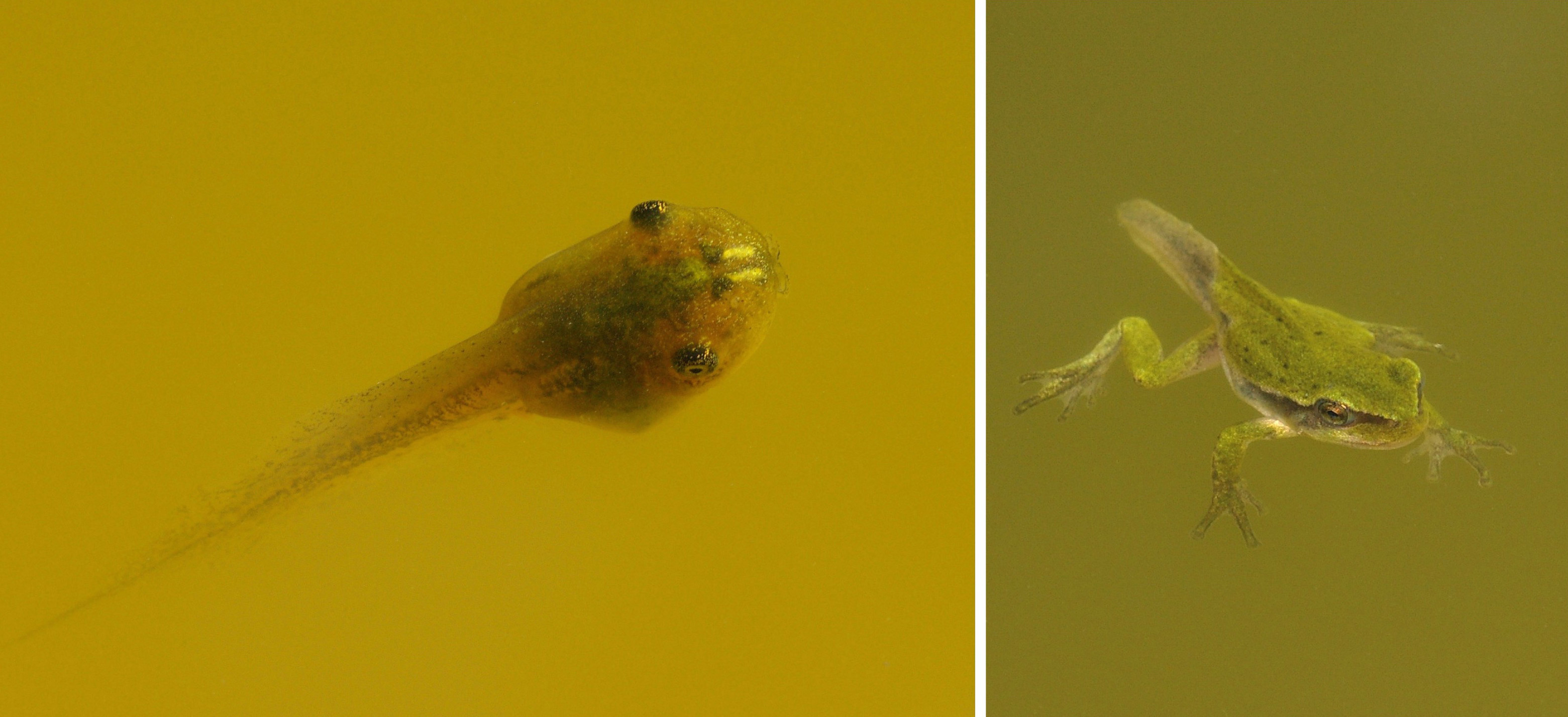
Hyla arborea tadpole and metamorph

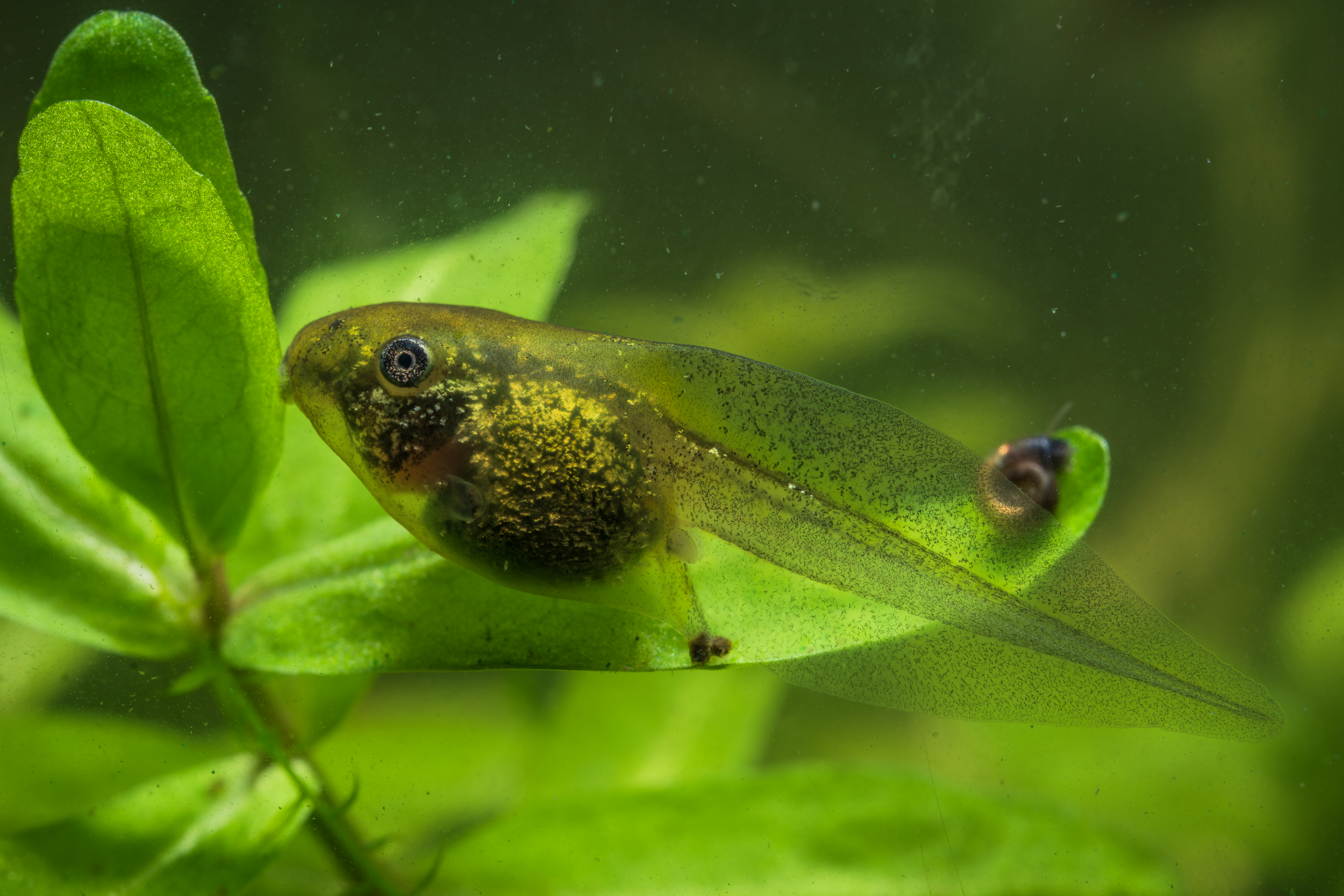
Tadpole/Larva of a European Green Tree Frog approx. 3-4 weeks old

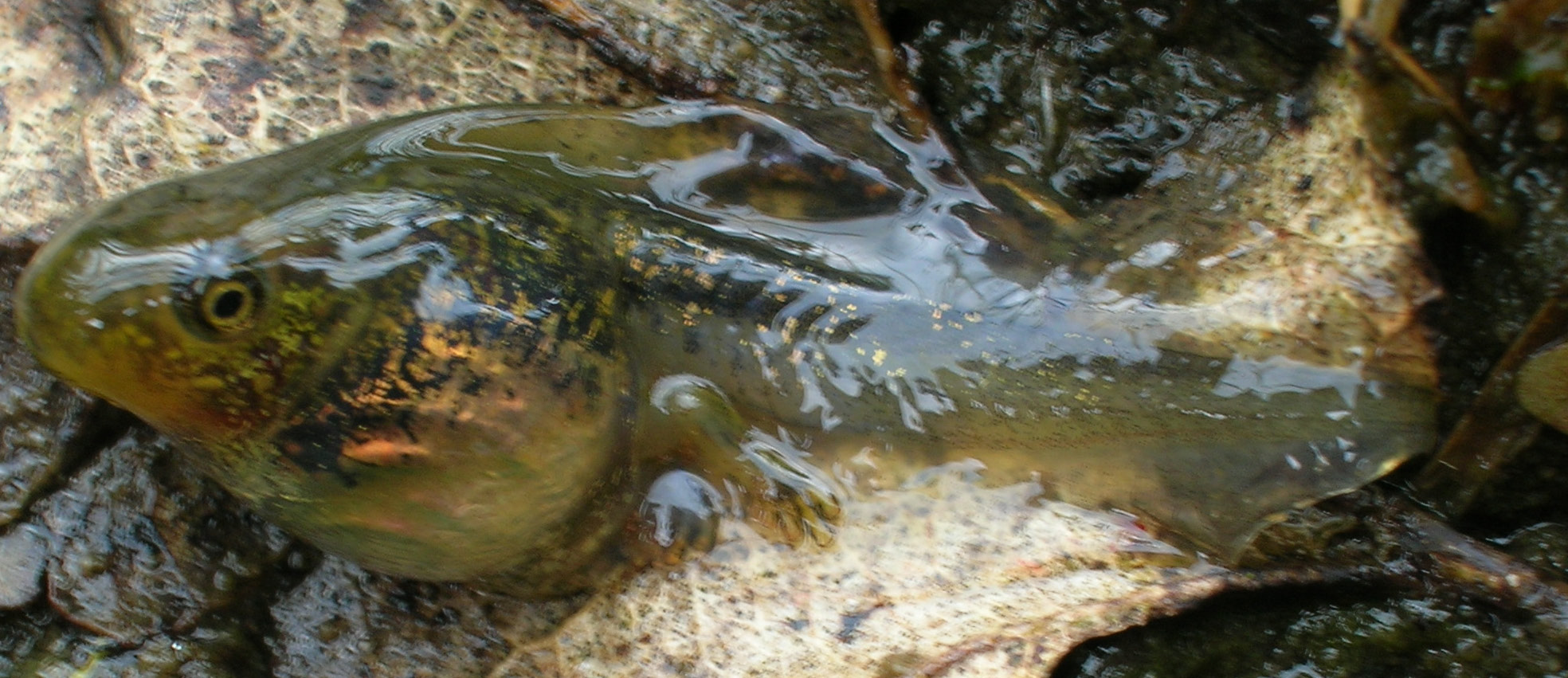
Tadpole with hind legs

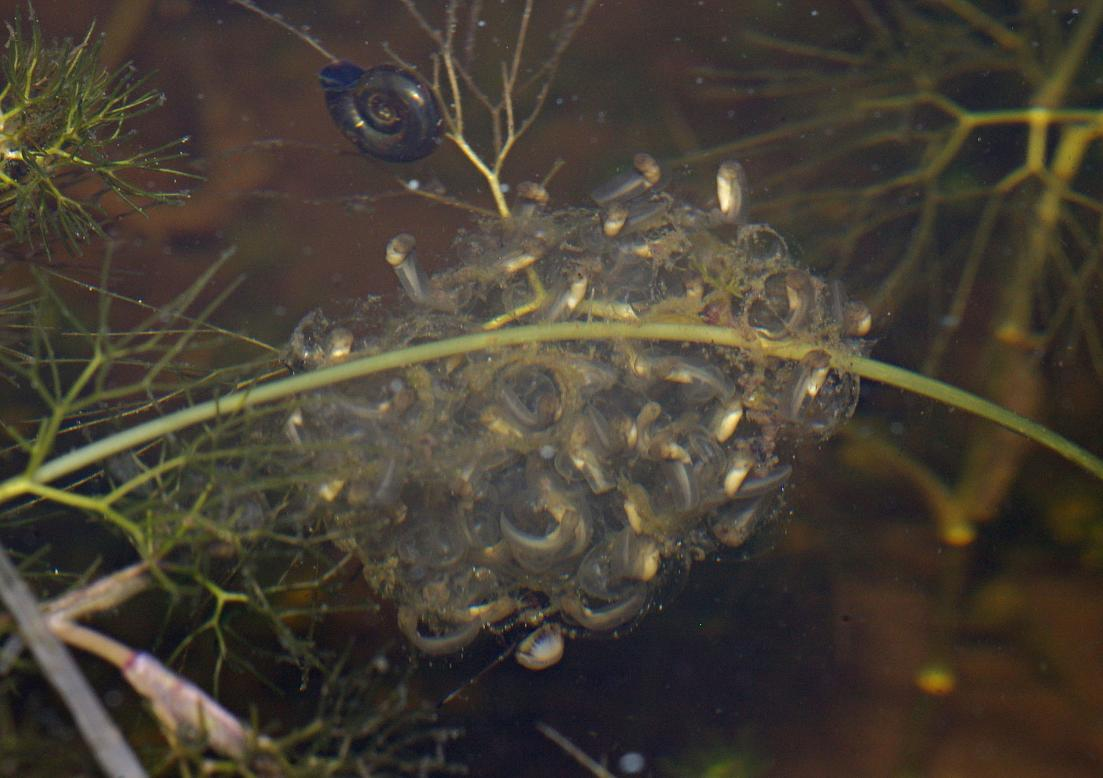
Newborn tadpoles hatching from frogspawn

European tree frogs in Witte Veen
