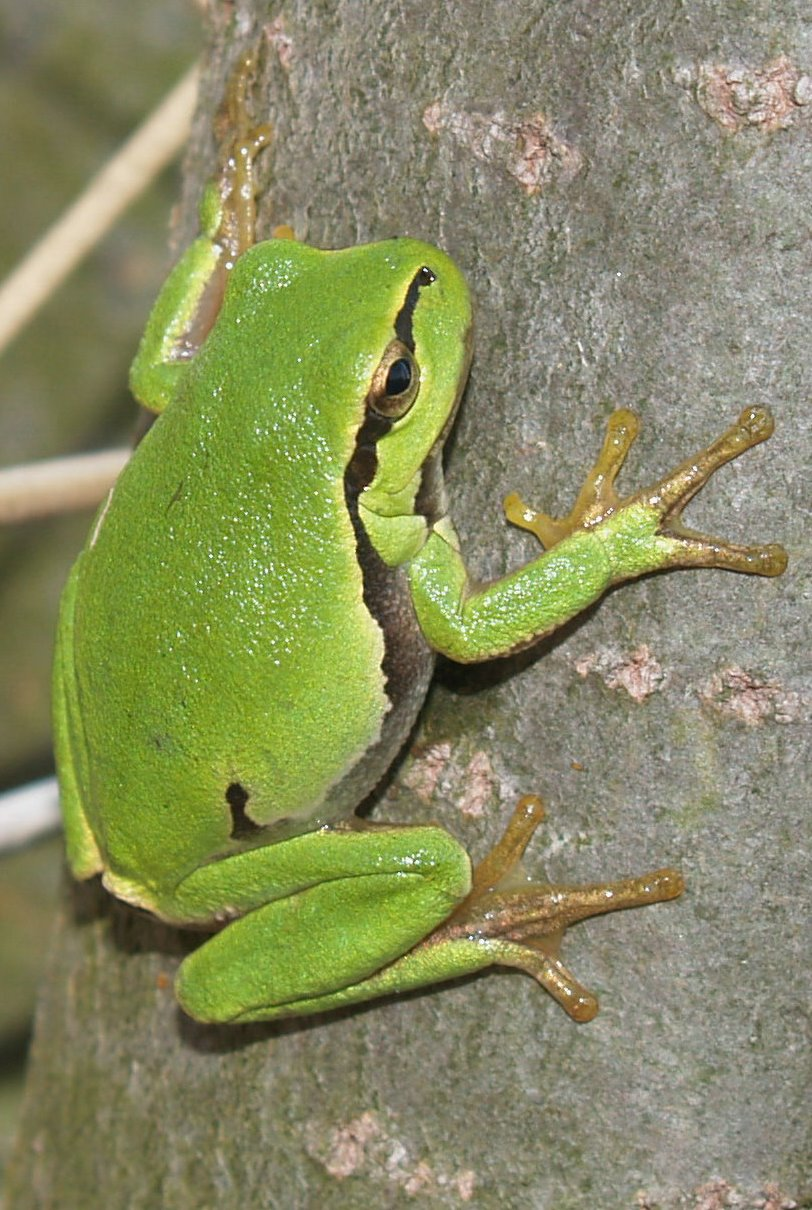
- Hyla arborea

Scientific classification
- Kingdom: Animalia
- Phylum: Chordata
- Class: Amphibia
- Order: Anura
- Family: Hylidae
- Subfamily: Hylinae; Rafinesque, 1815

Type genus
- Hylaria Rafinesque, 1814 (an unjustified emendation of Hyla Laurenti, 1768)

Genera
- 18 genera (but see text)

= Hylinae =

Subfamily of amphibians

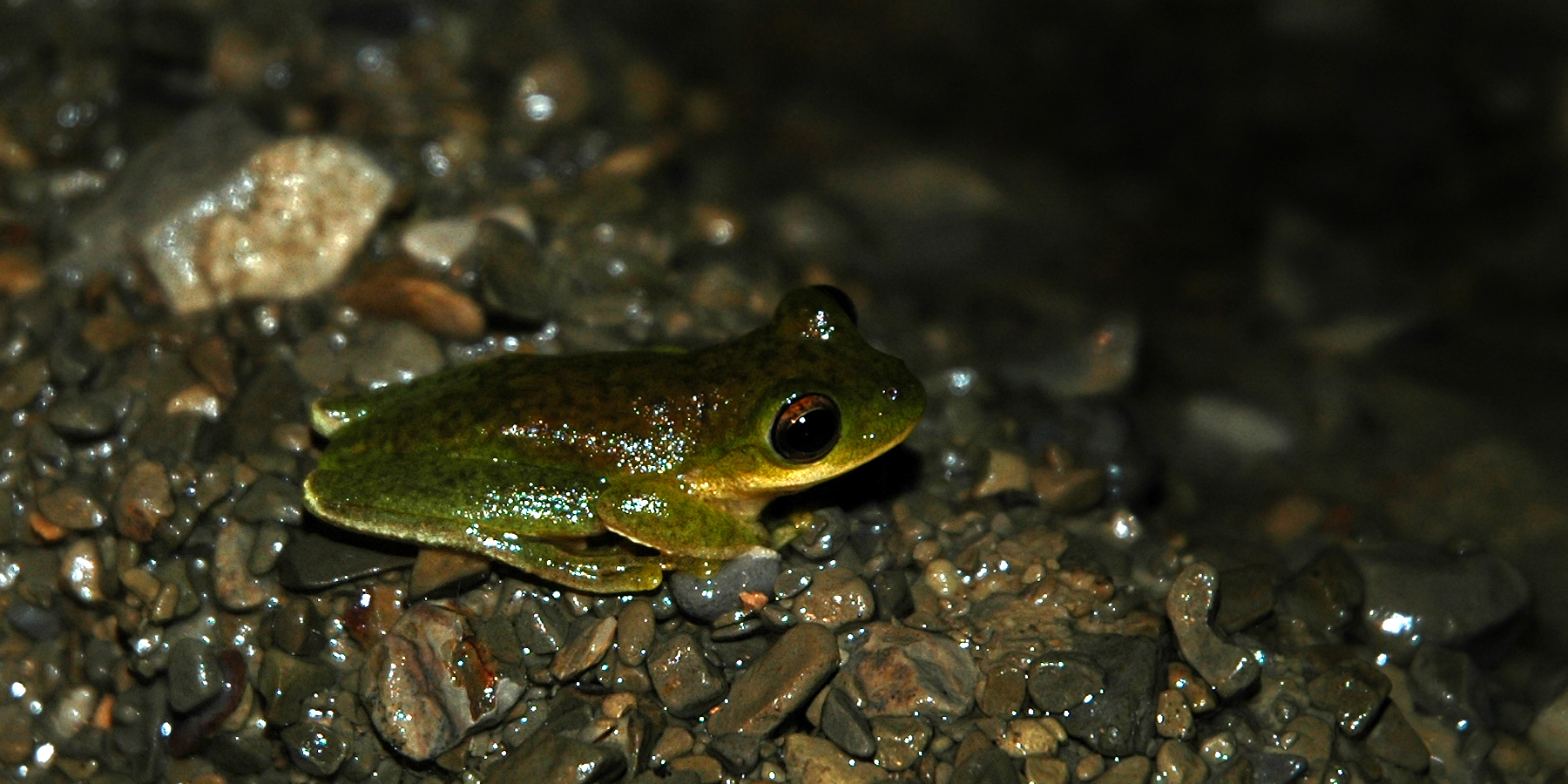
Small-eared treefrog, (Rheohyla miotympanum), Municipality of Tula, Tamaulipas, Mexico (16 September 2009).

Hylinae is a large subfamily of "tree frogs", family Hylidae.

== Classification ==
The contents of this subfamily vary substantially according to the source. The Amphibian Species of the World follows the revision by Duellman and colleagues from 2016 based on molecular data and delimits the subfamily more narrowly than before, treating parts of former Hylinae as their own subfamilies. Following this classification, there were 18 genera totaling 174 species in the end of 2020. They are found North, Central, and the northmost South America, much of temperate Eurasia, Japan, and extreme northern Africa, however, only Hyla is found outside the Americas.

The AmphibiaWeb follows an older classification defining Hylinae more broadly, with several hundred species. At the end of 2020, the AmphibiaWeb lists 42 genera totaling 737 species.

=== Amphibian Species of the World ===
At the end of 2020, the Amphibian Species of the World includes the following 18 genera:

- Atlantihyla Faivovich, Pereyra, Luna, Hertz, Blotto, Vásquez-Almazán, McCranie, Sánchez, Baêta, Araujo-Vieira, Köhler, Kubicki, Campbell, Frost, Wheeler, and Haddad, 2018
- Bromeliohyla Faivovich, Haddad, Garcia, Frost, Campbell, and Wheeler, 2005
- Charadrahyla Faivovich, Haddad, Garcia, Frost, Campbell, and Wheeler, 2005
- Dryophytes Fitzinger, 1843
- Duellmanohyla Campbell and Smith, 1992
- Ecnomiohyla Faivovich, Haddad, Garcia, Frost, Campbell, and Wheeler, 2005
- Exerodonta Brocchi, 1879
- Hyla Laurenti, 1768
- Isthmohyla Faivovich, Haddad, Garcia, Frost, Campbell, and Wheeler, 2005
- Megastomatohyla Faivovich, Haddad, Garcia, Frost, Campbell, and Wheeler, 2005
- Plectrohyla Brocchi, 1877
- Ptychohyla Taylor, 1944
- Quilticohyla Faivovich, Pereyra, Luna, Hertz, Blotto, Vásquez-Almazán, McCranie, Sánchez, Baêta, Araujo-Vieira, Köhler, Kubicki, Campbell, Frost, Wheeler, and Haddad, 2018
- Rheohyla Duellman, Marion, and Hedges, 2016
- Sarcohyla Duellman, Marion, and Hedges, 2016
- Smilisca Cope, 1865
- Tlalocohyla Faivovich, Haddad, Garcia, Frost, Campbell, and Wheeler, 2005
- Triprion Cope, 1866

=== AmphibiaWeb ===
At the end of 2020, the AmphibiaWeb includes the following 42 genera:

- Acris
- Anotheca
- Aparasphenodon
- Argenteohyla
- Boana
- Bokermannohyla
- Bromeliohyla
- Charadrahyla
- Corythomantis
- Dendropsophus
- Diaglena
- Dryaderces
- Duellmanohyla
- Ecnomiohyla
- Exerodonta
- Hyla
- Hyliola
- Hyloscirtus
- Isthmohyla
- Itapotihyla
- Lysapsus
- Megastomatohyla
- Myersiohyla
- Nesorohyla
- Nyctimantis
- Osteocephalus
- Osteopilus
- Phyllodytes
- Plectrohyla
- Pseudacris
- Pseudis
- Ptychohyla
- Sarcohyla
- Scarthyla
- Scinax
- Smilisca
- Sphaenorhynchus
- Tepuihyla
- Tlalocohyla
- Trachycephalus
- Triprion
- Xenohyla

== Characteristics ==
Hylinae are largely arboreal frogs, although Smilisca and Triprion are burrowers. Eggs are deposited in water and the tadpoles are aquatic.
