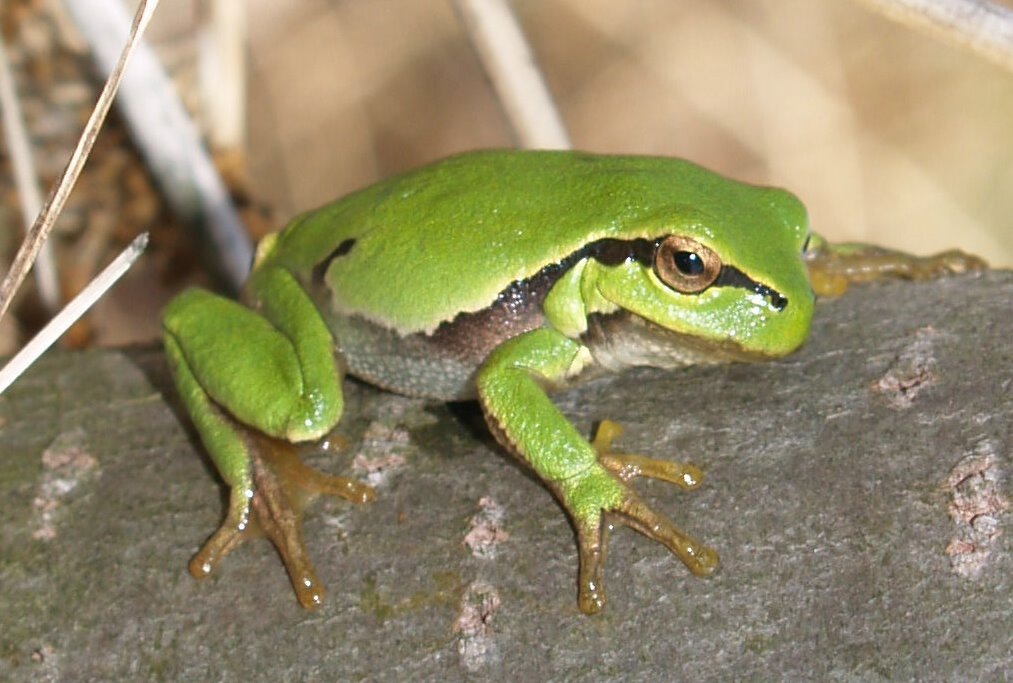
- European tree frog Hyla arborea

Scientific classification
- Kingdom: Animalia
- Phylum: Chordata
- Class: Amphibia
- Order: Anura
- Superfamily: Hyloidea
- Family: Hylidae; Rafinesque, 1815

Subfamilies
- Acrisinae; Hylinae
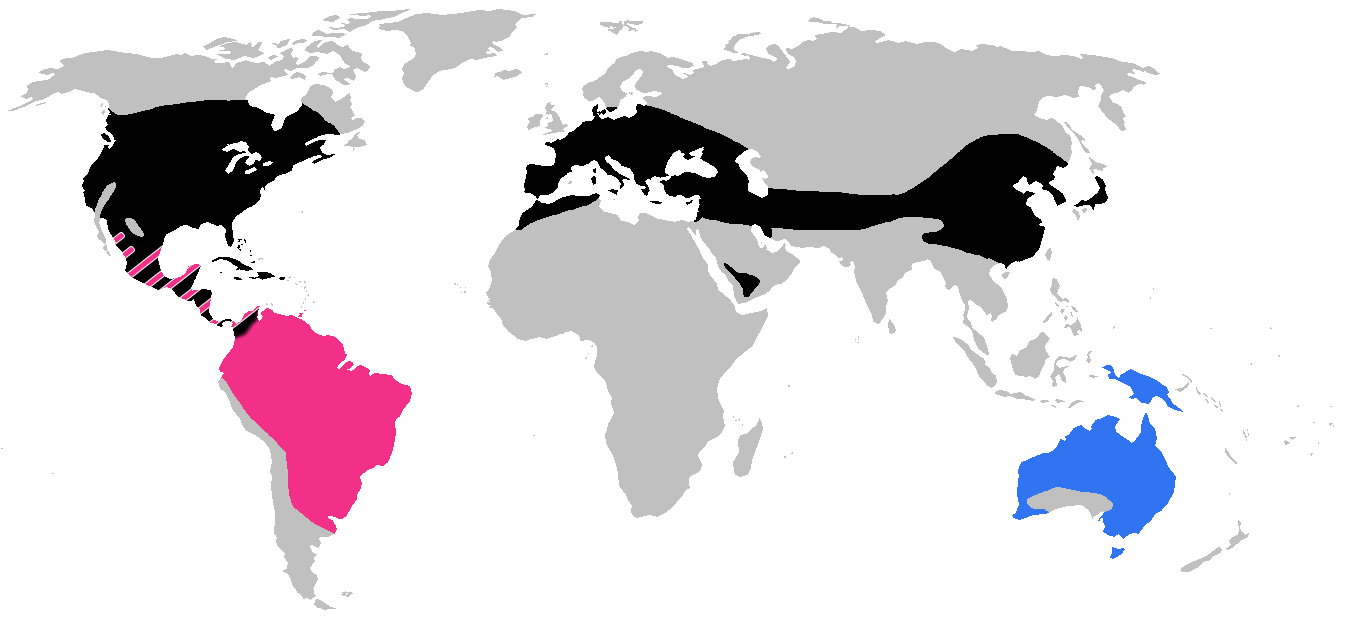
- Distribution of Hylidae in black, with sister taxa Phyllomedusidae in pink and Pelodryadidae in blue.

= Hylidae =

Hylidae Temporal range: 70.6–0 Ma Cretaceous – recent

Family of frogs

Hylidae is a wide-ranging family of frogs commonly referred to as "tree frogs and their allies". However, the hylids include a diversity of frog species, many of which do not live in trees, but are terrestrial or semiaquatic.

== Taxonomy and systematics ==
The earliest known fossils that can be assigned to this family are from the Cretaceous of India and the state of Wyoming in the United States.

The common name of "tree frog" is a popular name for several species of the family Hylidae. However, the name "treefrog" is not unique to this family, also being used for many species in the family Rhacophoridae, Phyllomedusidae and Pelodryadinae.

The following genera are recognised in the family Hylidae:

- Tribe Cophomantini
  - Aplastodiscus – canebrake treefrogs
  - Boana – gladiator treefrogs
  - Bokermannohyla
  - Hyloscirtus
  - Myersiohyla
  - Nesorohyla
  - "Hyla" nicefori
- Tribe Dendropsophini
  - Dendropsophus
  - Xenohyla
- Tribe Hylini
  - Acris – cricket frogs
  - Atlantihyla
  - Bromeliohyla
  - Charadrahyla
  - Dryophytes – Ameroasian treefrogs
  - Duellmanohyla – brook frogs
  - Ecnomiohyla
  - Exerodonta
  - Hyla – common tree frogs
  - Isthmohyla
  - Megastomatohyla
  - Plectrohyla – spike-thumb frogs
  - Pseudacris – chorus frogs
  - Ptychohyla – stream frogs
  - Quilticohyla
  - Rheohyla – small-eared treefrog
  - Sarcohyla
  - Smilisca – burrowing frogs
  - Tlalocohyla
  - Triprion – shovel-headed tree frogs
- Tribe Lophiohylini
  - Aparasphenodon – casque-headed frogs
  - Argenteohyla – Argentinian frogs
  - Corythomantis – casque-headed tree frog
  - Dryaderces
  - Itapotihyla
  - Nyctimantis – brown-eyed tree frogs
  - Osteocephalus – slender-legged tree frogs
  - Osteopilus
  - Phyllodytes – heart-tongued frogs
  - Phytotriades – Trinidad golden treefrogs
  - Tepuihyla – Amazon tree frogs
  - Trachycephalus – casque-headed tree frog
- Tribe Pseudini
  - Lysapsus – harlequin frogs
  - Pseudis – swimming frogs
  - Scarthyla – Madre de Dios tree frogs
- Tribe Scinaxini
  - Julianus
  - Ololygon (synonymous with Scinax)
  - Scinax – snouted tree frogs
- Tribe Sphaenorhynchini
  - Sphaenorhynchus – lime tree frogs
- Incertae sedis
  - "Hyla" imitator – mimic tree frog

The subfamilies Pelodryadinae and Phyllomedusinae are sometimes classified as subfamilies of Hylidae, but due to their deep divergence and unique evolutionary history are increasingly considered separate (with Pelodryadidae being the sister group to Phyllomedusidae and colonizing Australia during the Eocene via the Antarctic land bridge, which at the time was not yet frozen over).

== Description ==
Most hylids show adaptations suitable for an arboreal lifestyle, including forward-facing eyes providing binocular vision, and adhesive pads on the fingers and toes. In the nonarboreal species, these features may be greatly reduced, or absent.

== Distribution and habitat ==
The European tree frog (Hyla arborea) is common in the middle and south of Europe, and its range extends into Asia and North Africa.

North America has many species of the family Hylidae, including the gray tree frog (Hyla versicolor) and the American green tree frog (H. cinerea). The spring peeper (Pseudacris crucifer) is also widespread in the eastern United States and is commonly heard on spring and summer evenings.

== Behaviour and ecology ==
Species of the genus Cyclorana are burrowing frogs that spend much of their lives underground.

=== Breeding ===
Hylids lay their eggs in a range of different locations, depending on species. Many use ponds, or puddles that collect in the holes of their trees, while others use bromeliads or other water-holding plants. Other species lay their eggs on the leaves of vegetation hanging over water, allowing the tadpoles to drop into the pond when they hatch.

A few species use fast-flowing streams, attaching the eggs firmly to the substrate. The tadpoles of these species have suckers enabling them to hold on to rocks after they hatch. Another unusual adaptation is found in some South American hylids, which brood the eggs on the back of the female. The tadpoles of most hylid species have laterally placed eyes and broad tails with narrow, filamentous tips.

=== Feeding ===
Hylids mostly feed on insects and other invertebrates, but some larger species can feed on small vertebrates.

== Gallery ==
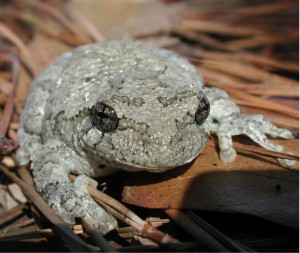
Dryophytes versicolor, North American gray tree frog

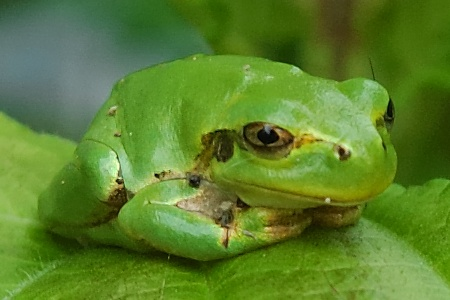
Hyla japonica, Japanese tree frog

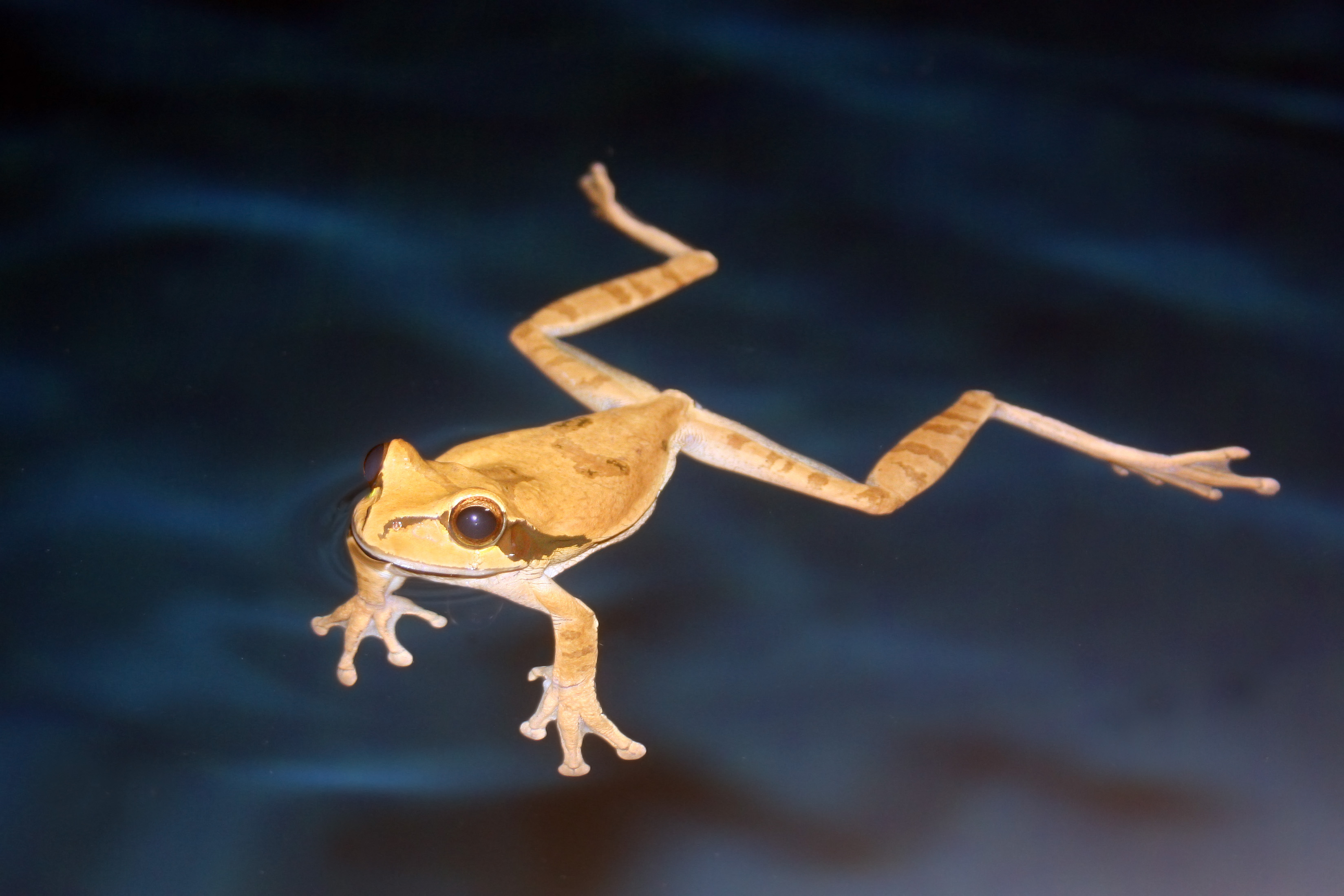
Smilisca phaeota, Osa Peninsula, Costa Rica
