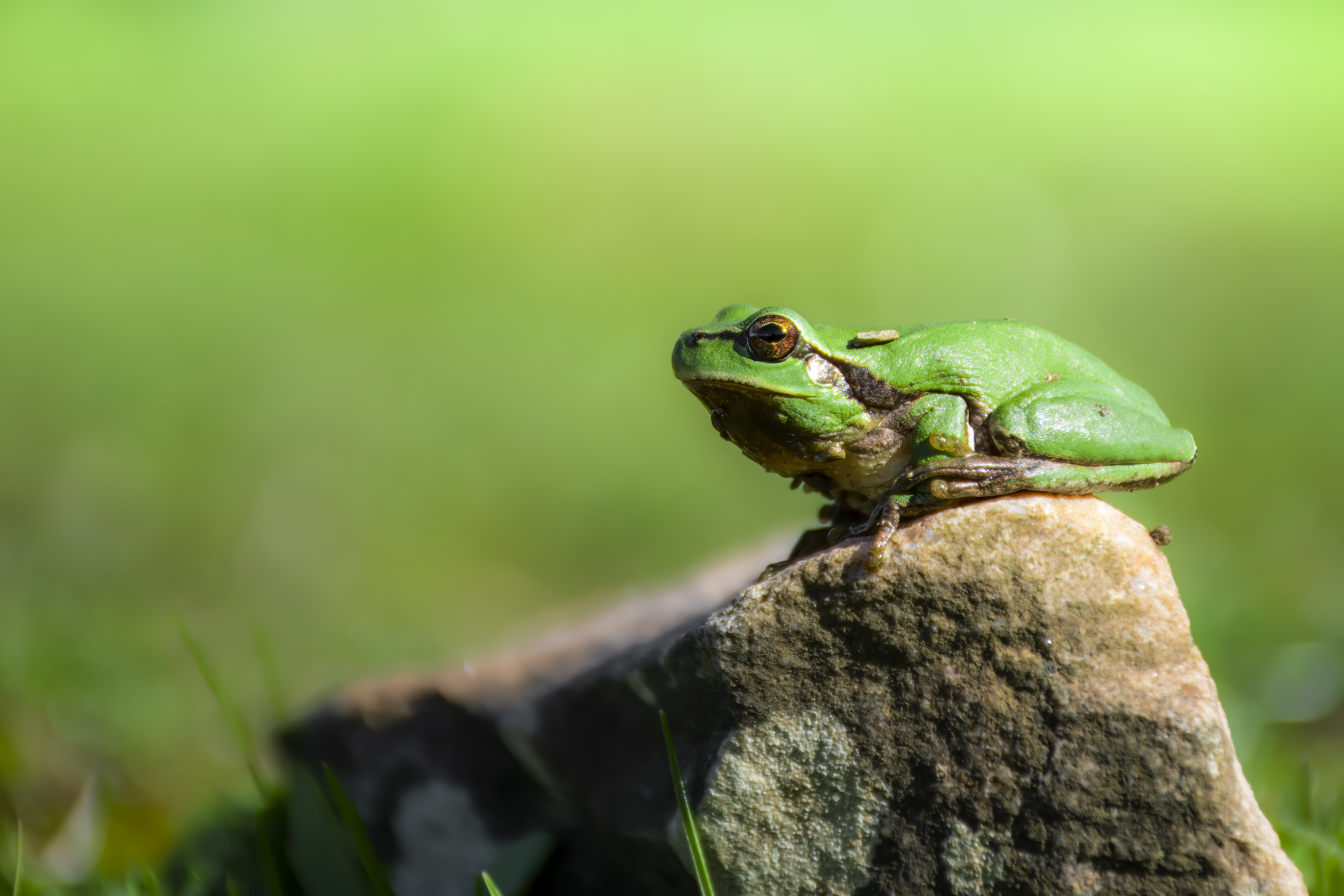
- Hyla carthaginiensis in El Feidja National Park

Scientific classification
- Domain: Eukaryota
- Kingdom: Animalia
- Phylum: Chordata
- Class: Amphibia
- Order: Anura
- Family: Hylidae
- Subfamily: Hylinae
- Genus: Hyla
- Species: H. carthaginiensis

Binomial name
- Hyla carthaginiensis Dufresnes, Beddek, Skorinov, Fumagalli, Perrin, Crochet, & Litvinchuk, 2019

= Carthaginian tree frog =

Species of frog

The Carthaginian tree frog (Hyla carthaginiensis) is a species of tree frog from humid coastal areas of northeastern Algeria and northwestern Tunisia. It is most closely related to Hyla meridionalis, the Mediterranean or stripeless tree frog, of which it was formerly considered a population. The two species likely overlap in range in Algeria.
