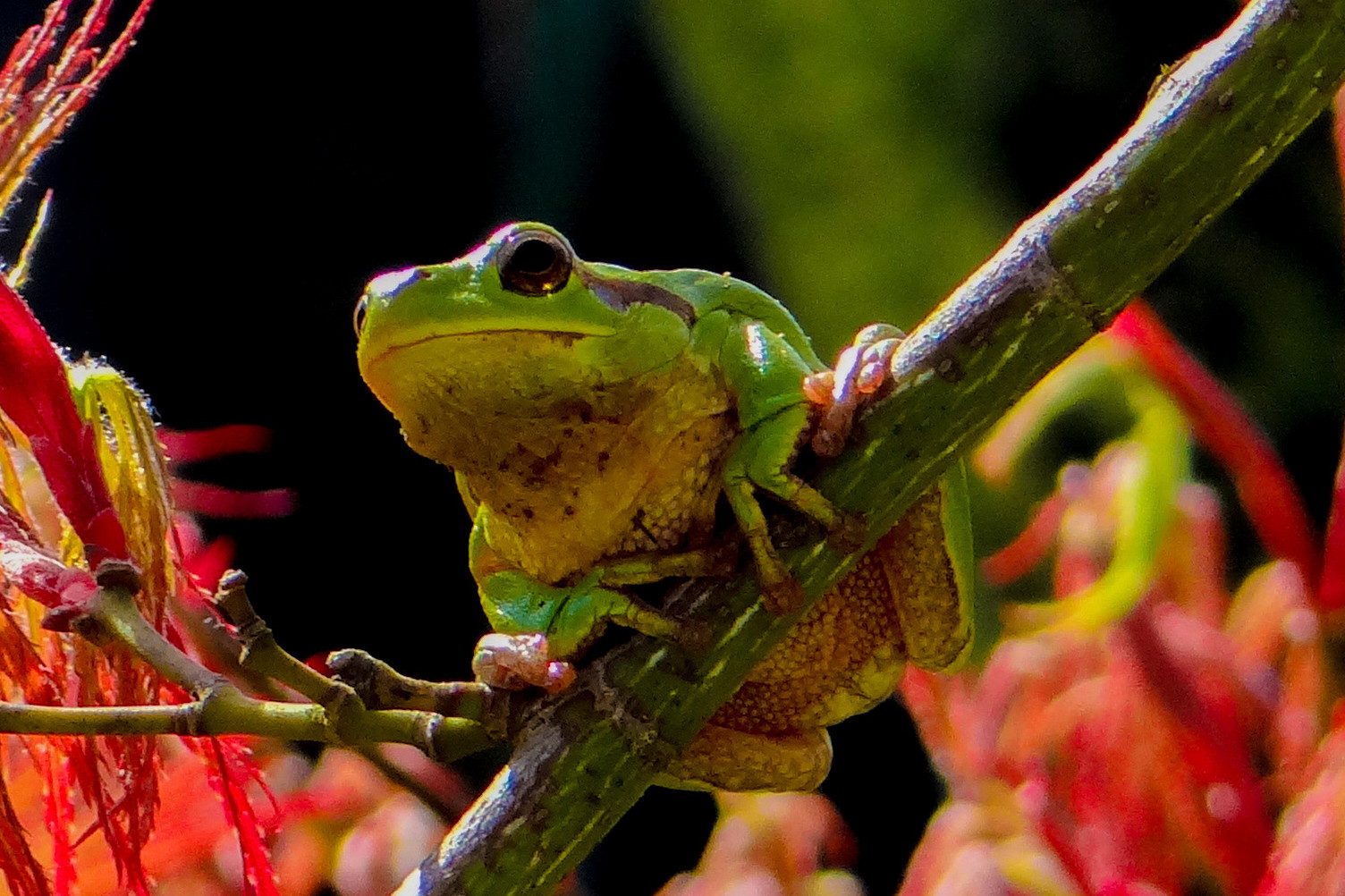

Conservation status
- Least Concern (IUCN 3.1)

Scientific classification
- Kingdom: Animalia
- Phylum: Chordata
- Class: Amphibia
- Order: Anura
- Family: Hylidae
- Genus: Hyla
- Species: H. perrini

Binomial name
- Hyla perrini Dufresnes, Mazepa, Rodrigues, Brelsford, Litvinchuk, Sermier, Lavanchy, Betto-Colliard, Blaser, Borzée, Cavoto, Fabre, Ghali, Grossen, Horn, Leuenberger, Phillips, Saunders, Savary, Maddalena, Stöck, Dubey, Canestrelli, and Jeffries, 2018

Synonyms
- Hyla intermedia perrini – Speybroeck et al., 2020

= Hyla perrini =

Species of frog

Hyla perrini, also known as Perrin's tree frog or Po's tree toad, is a species of frog in the family Hylidae. It is endemic to Europe. It is known from the Po Plain in northern Italy, and in adjacent Switzerland (Ticino) and Slovenia.

Scientists used to consider this animal conspecific with Hyla intermedia but they are currently classified as two separate species.
