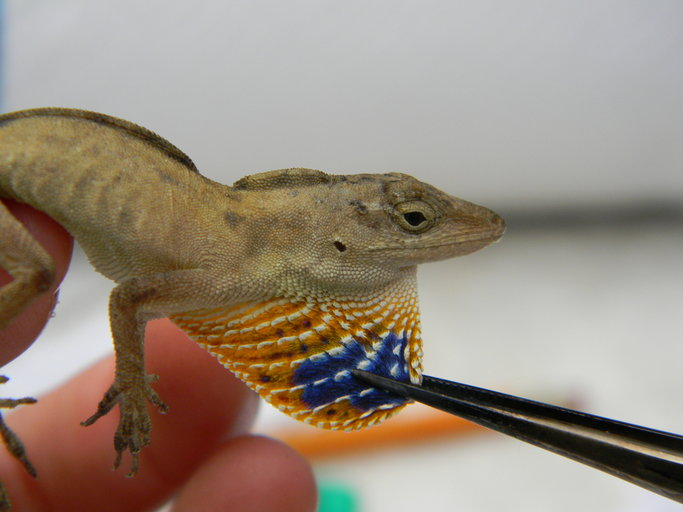

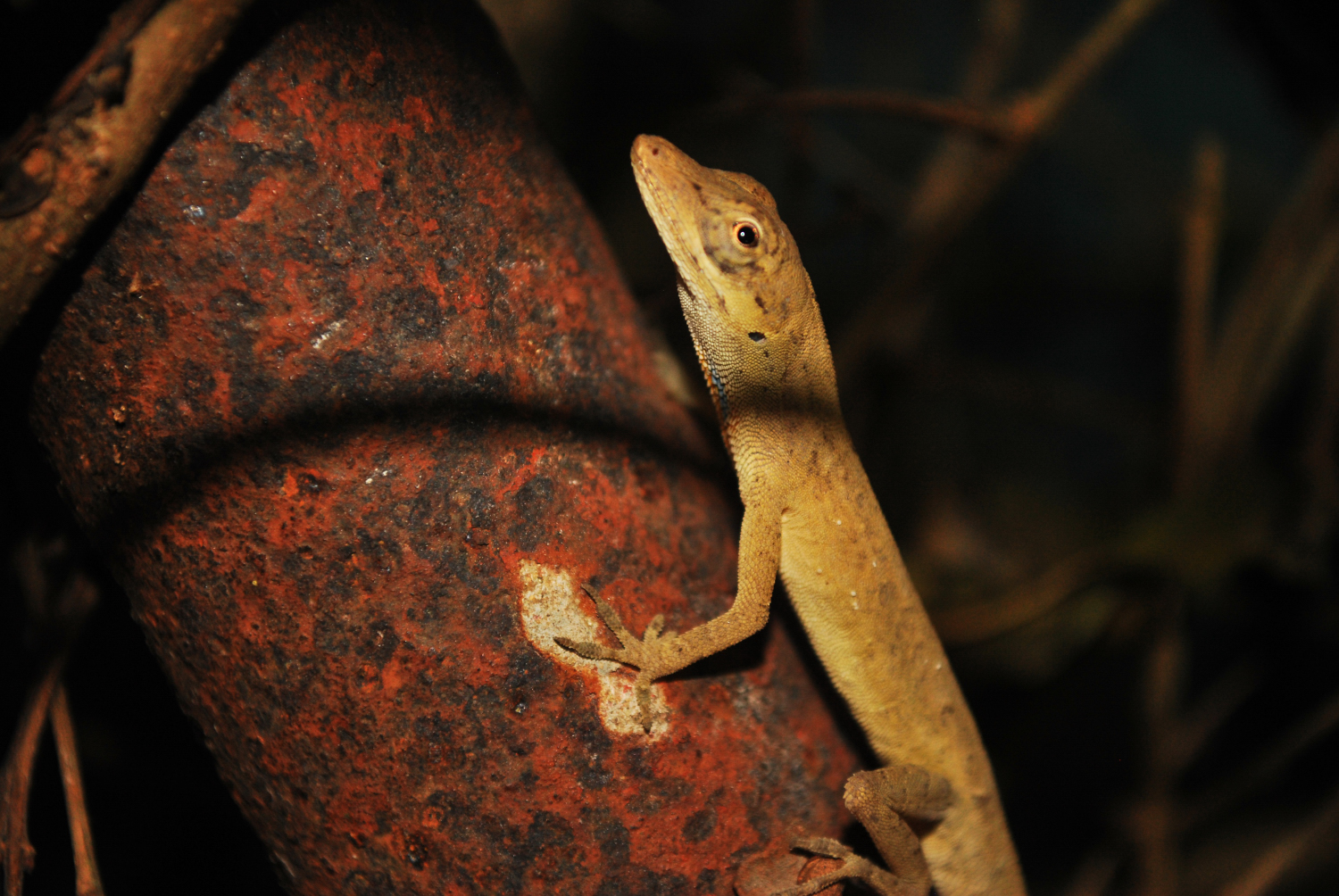

Conservation status
- Least Concern (IUCN 3.1)

Scientific classification
- Kingdom: Animalia
- Phylum: Chordata
- Class: Reptilia
- Order: Squamata
- Suborder: Iguania
- Family: Dactyloidae
- Genus: Anolis
- Species: A. sericeus

Binomial name
- Anolis sericeus Hallowell, 1856

= Anolis sericeus =

Species of lizard

Anolis sericeus, the silky anole, is a species of lizard in the family Dactyloidae. The species is found in Mexico, Guatemala, and Costa Rica.

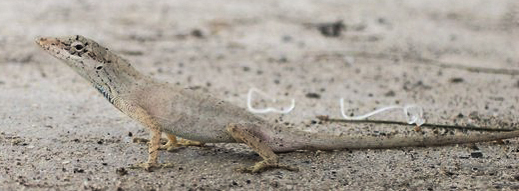
Silky anole
