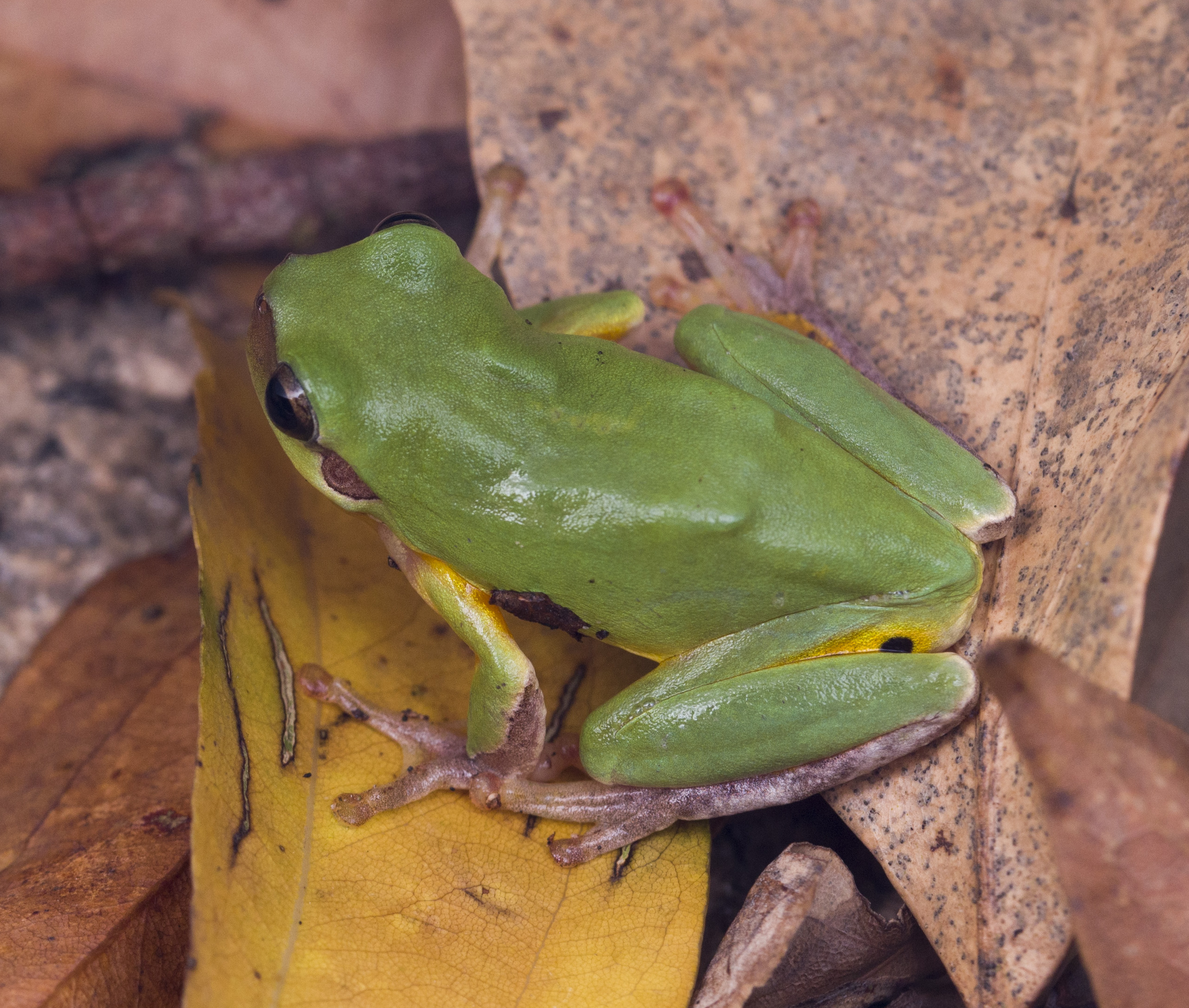
- Taichung Metropolitan Park, Taichung, Taiwan

Conservation status
- Least Concern (IUCN 3.1)

Scientific classification
- Kingdom: Animalia
- Phylum: Chordata
- Class: Amphibia
- Order: Anura
- Family: Hylidae
- Genus: Hyla
- Species: H. chinensis

Binomial name
- Hyla chinensis Günther, 1859

= Common Chinese tree frog =

Species of amphibian

The common Chinese tree frog (Hyla chinensis), (Simplfied Chinese: 中国雨蛙; Traditional Chinese: 中國雨蛙; Hanyu Pinyin: Zhōngguó yǔwā), also known as the common Chinese treetoad and Chinese tree toad, is a species of frog in the family Hylidae found in southeastern and eastern China and in Taiwan. There is also one record from Vietnam but it is uncertain whether it really represents this species or Hyla annectans.

H. chinensis is a small frog, 25–33 mm (0.98–1.30 in) in snout–vent length, inhabiting trees and shrubs in forests, but also living in agricultural landscapes (cultivated rice fields, ponds, and corn bushes).

The International Union for Conservation of Nature (IUCN) has classified H. chinensis as of "least concern", but it can suffer from habitat loss.
