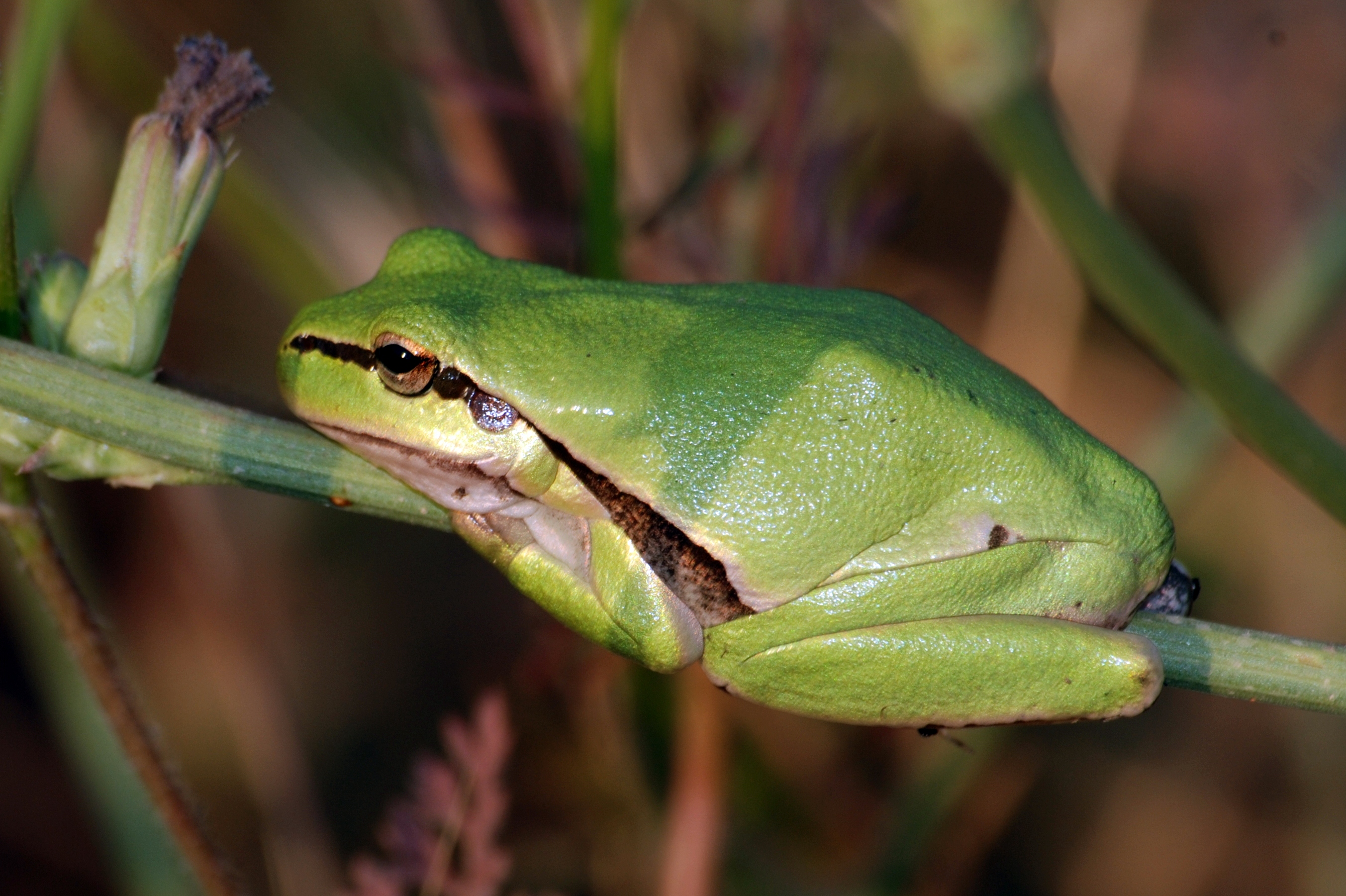

Conservation status
- Least Concern (IUCN 3.1)

Scientific classification
- Kingdom: Animalia
- Phylum: Chordata
- Class: Amphibia
- Order: Anura
- Family: Hylidae
- Genus: Hyla
- Species: H. savignyi

Binomial name
- Hyla savignyi Audouin, 1827

Synonyms
- Hyla arborea savignyi Audouin, 1829; Hyla arborea var. savignyi Audouin, 1829

= Hyla savignyi =

Species of amphibian

Hyla savignyi, also known as Savigny's treefrog, lemon-yellow tree frog, and Middle East tree frog, is a species of frog in the family Hylidae. This frog is found in south western Asia, Cyprus and northeastern Egypt.

== Taxonomy ==
Hyla savignyi was first formally described as Hyla arborea savignyi in 1829 by the French naturalist Jean Victor Audouin with its type locality given as Egypt. It was recognised as a distinct species from the European tree frog (H. arborea) in 1974 with later authors recognising that this taxon is actually two species, the other being the Arabian tree frog (H. felixarabica). This species belongs to the genus Hyla, the type genus of the family Hylidae, which are often referred to as "tree frogs".

== Etymology ==
Hyla savignyi has the specific name, savignyi, which is in honor of French zoologist Marie Jules César Savigny, who travelled to Egypt with Napoleon on the French invasion of Egypt and Syria between 1798 and 1802

== Description ==
Hyla savignyi is similar to the European tree frog but this species is distinguished the lateral band being broken up into spots and by the absnece of an inguinal loop in this band. It is smaller with a snout-to-vent length is 30–47 mm (1.2–1.9 in). There is no dark spot on the upper lip below eye and the distance between the nostrils is equal to or greater than the distance from the nostril to the upper lip. The tympanic membrane is smaller than the eye. The back is varied in colour, the colour being affected by temperature and the colour of the substrate, it is typically green, sometimes yellowish but always paler than the European tree frog.

== Geographic range ==
Hyla savignyi is found in south western Asia as well as north-western Sinai in Egypt and Cyprus. In Asia it occurs in Israel, Lebanon, northwestern Jordan, there are isolated subpopulations in Syria and southern and eastern Türkiye to the western part of Iran, northern, north-eastern and south-eastern Iraq in Kurdistan Province, and Armenia, southern Georgia and Azerbaijan.

== Habitat ==
Hyla savignyi prefers to live in much drier landscapes than the sympatric subspecies of European tree frog (H. arborea schelkownikowi), including steppes, deserts and semi-deserts. It is typically found near water bodies, in wet sites, oases, gardens, bushlands, and montane forest margins. Thee frogs can be found sitting on trees, bushes, leafs and on land under logs, stones and in burrows, sometimes at long distances from water bodies in dry environments, such as rocky slopes and on the xerophytic bushes. Spawning occurs in small ponds and puddles, some of which are very small, and slowly flowing brooks with dense vegetation.

== Biology ==
Hyla savignyi is found in very hot and dry regions. Once the breeding season is over, this tree frog is nocturnal and they remain motionless for hours, becoming active only after nightfall. However, the males will call during both dry and wet weather. At dusk, these frogs become active and begin foraging as well as entering waterbodies to obtian moisture. They hibernate from October/November up to the start of the Spring in March and April October. In the more southern portion of its range they may hibernate for only a short time, or notat all. They hibernate on land, in burrows in the soil and other hiding places.

In the breeding season the males make a call which resembles the chirping of a cicada. Females lay 200-1000 eggs which are deposited in clumps of 270-315 eggs. They are deposited over a few hours, the eggs being suck to aquatic vegetation or left to drift in the water. Metamorphosis of the tadpoles into froglets occurs in different months of the summer, earlier in the warmer parts of its range. Sexual maturity is probably reached when the frogs are 3 or 4 years old. As tadpoles these animals eat plant and animal matter. The adults are primarily insectivorous, with beetles, bees, wasps, ants and flies being very important. They also eat molluscs, arachnids and some other insects.

== Sources ==
- IUCN Database "Global Amphibian Assessment" - Hyla savignyi (Status, distribution map, literature. Data posted May 2006) Downloaded on 26 February 2008.
- Stöck M, Dubey S, Klütsch C, Litvinchuk SN, Scheidt U, Perrin N. 2008. Mitochondrial and nuclear phylogeny of circum-Mediterranean tree frogs from the Hyla arborea group. Molecular Phylogenetics and Evolution 49: 1019–1024.
- Schneider H. 2009. Hyla savignyi Audouin 1827 - Mittelöstlicher-Laubfrosch. Handbuch der Reptilien und Amphibien Europas. Band 5/II Froschlurche (Anura) II (Hylidae, Bufonidae). Wiebelsheim: AULA-Verlag. pp. 141–172.
- Gvoždík V, Moravec J, Klütsch C, Kotlík P. 2010. Phylogeography of the Middle Eastern tree frogs (Hyla, Hylidae, Amphibia) inferred from nuclear and mitochondrial DNA variation, with a description of a new species. Molecular Phylogenetics and Evolution 55: 1146–1166.
