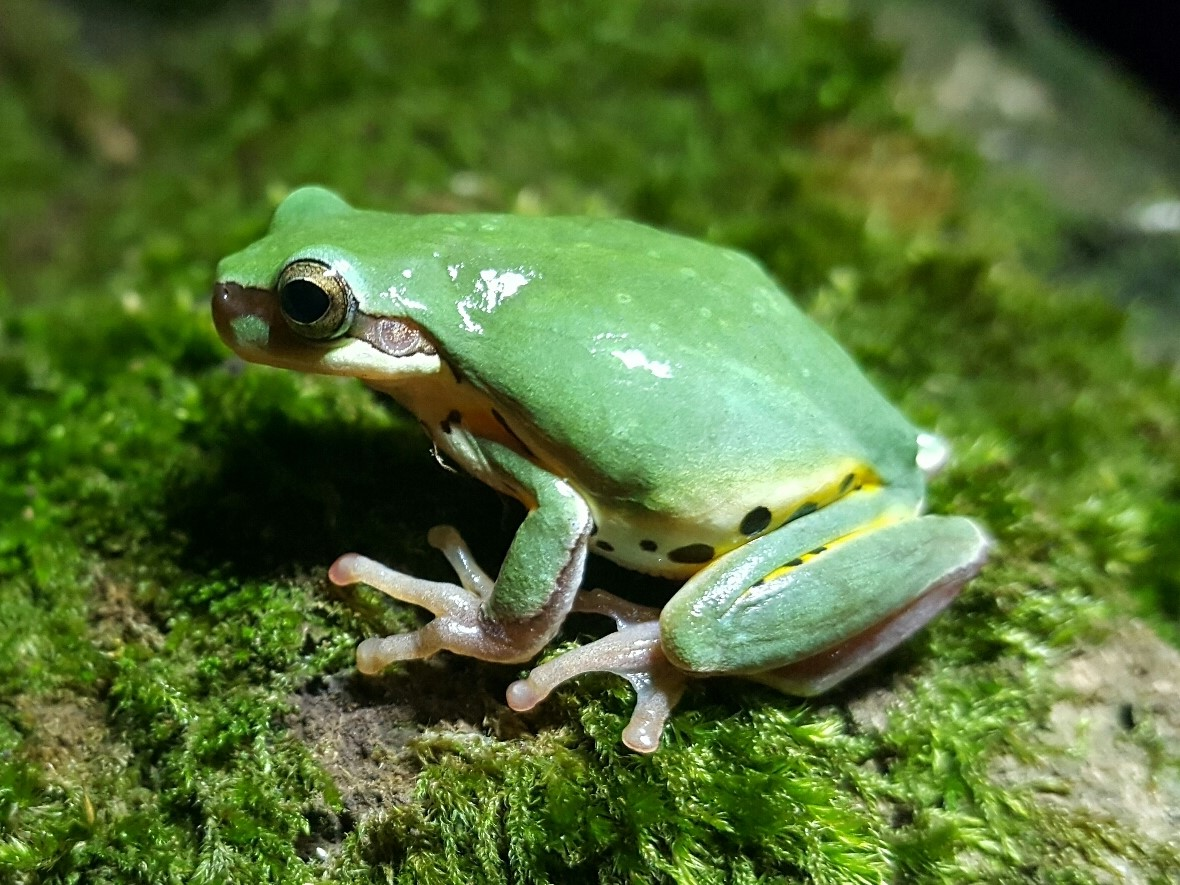

Conservation status
- Least Concern (IUCN 3.1)

Scientific classification
- Kingdom: Animalia
- Phylum: Chordata
- Class: Amphibia
- Order: Anura
- Family: Hylidae
- Genus: Hyla
- Species: H. simplex

Binomial name
- Hyla simplex Boettger, 1901

Synonyms
- Hyla chinensis var. simplex Boettger, 1901

= Annam tree frog =

Species of amphibian

Annam tree frog (Hyla simplex), also known as the South China tree toad, is a species of frog in the family Hylidae. It is found in southern China, Vietnam, and Laos. The Hainan tree toad (H. s. hainanensis) from Hainan Island is treated as a subspecies.

Male Annam tree frogs grow to a snout–vent length of about 37 mm (1.5 in) and females to 40 mm (1.6 in). Tadpoles are up to 32 mm (1.3 in) in length.

Annam tree frogs are a common, arboreal species living in montane areas, including fields, bamboo forests and shrubland. Breeding takes place in rice paddies and in permanent pools. It is potentially threatened by habitat degradation.
