= Hyla zhaopingensis =

Conservation status
- Data Deficient (IUCN 3.1)

Scientific classification
- Kingdom: Animalia
- Phylum: Chordata
- Class: Amphibia
- Order: Anura
- Family: Hylidae
- Genus: Hyla
- Species: H. zhaopingensis

Binomial name
- Hyla zhaopingensis Tang & Zhang, 1984

Species of amphibian

Hyla zhaopingensis is a species of frogs in the family Hylidae endemic to China. Its natural habitats are subtropical or tropical moist lowland forests, swamps, freshwater marshes, intermittent freshwater marshes, arable land, plantations, rural gardens, heavily degraded former forests, ponds, and irrigated land. It is threatened by habitat loss.
