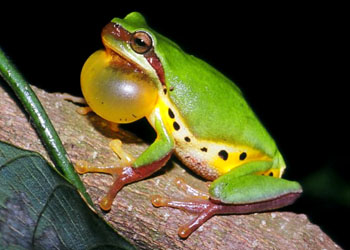

Conservation status
- Least Concern (IUCN 3.1)

Scientific classification
- Kingdom: Animalia
- Phylum: Chordata
- Class: Amphibia
- Order: Anura
- Family: Hylidae
- Genus: Hyla
- Species: H. hallowellii

Binomial name
- Hyla hallowellii Thompson, 1912

= Hallowell's tree frog =

Species of amphibian

Hallowell's tree frog (Hyla hallowellii) is a species of frog in the family Hylidae.

== Etymology ==
The specific name, hallowellii, is in honor of American herpetologist Edward Hallowell.

== Distribution and habitat ==
Hyla hallowelii is endemic to Japan.

The natural habitats of H. halowellii are subtropical or tropical moist lowland forests, subtropical or tropical moist shrubland, subtropical or tropical seasonally wet or flooded lowland grassland, swamps, freshwater marshes, intermittent freshwater marshes, plantations, heavily degraded former forests, ponds, irrigated land, canals, and ditches.
