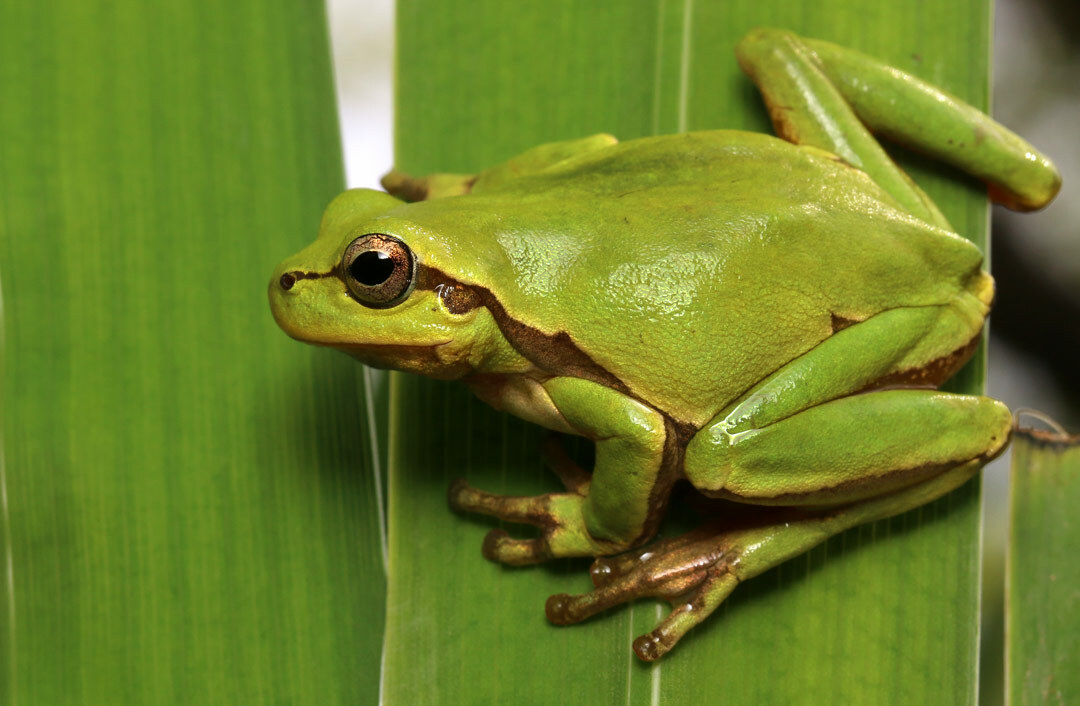

Conservation status
- Least Concern (IUCN 3.1)

Scientific classification
- Kingdom: Animalia
- Phylum: Chordata
- Class: Amphibia
- Order: Anura
- Family: Hylidae
- Genus: Hyla
- Species: H. orientalis

Binomial name
- Hyla orientalis Bedriaga, 1890

= Hyla orientalis =

Species of frog

Hyla orientalis, also known as the eastern tree frog, oriental tree frog or Shelkovnikov's tree frog, is a species from the genus Hyla. The species was originally described by Jacques von Bedriaga in 1890, and is found in eastern and southeastern Europe as well as Asia Minor and parts of west Asia.

== Melanism ==
Tree frogs living within the Chornobyl Exclusion Zone have a remarkably darker dorsal skin coloration than frogs from outside the Zone. Dark coloration is known to protect against different sources of radiation by neutralizing free radicals and reducing DNA damage, and, particularly melanin pigmentation has been proposed as a buffering mechanism against ionizing radiation. Exposure to high levels of ionizing radiation, likely at the time of the accident, may have been selected for darker coloration in Chornobyl tree frogs.
