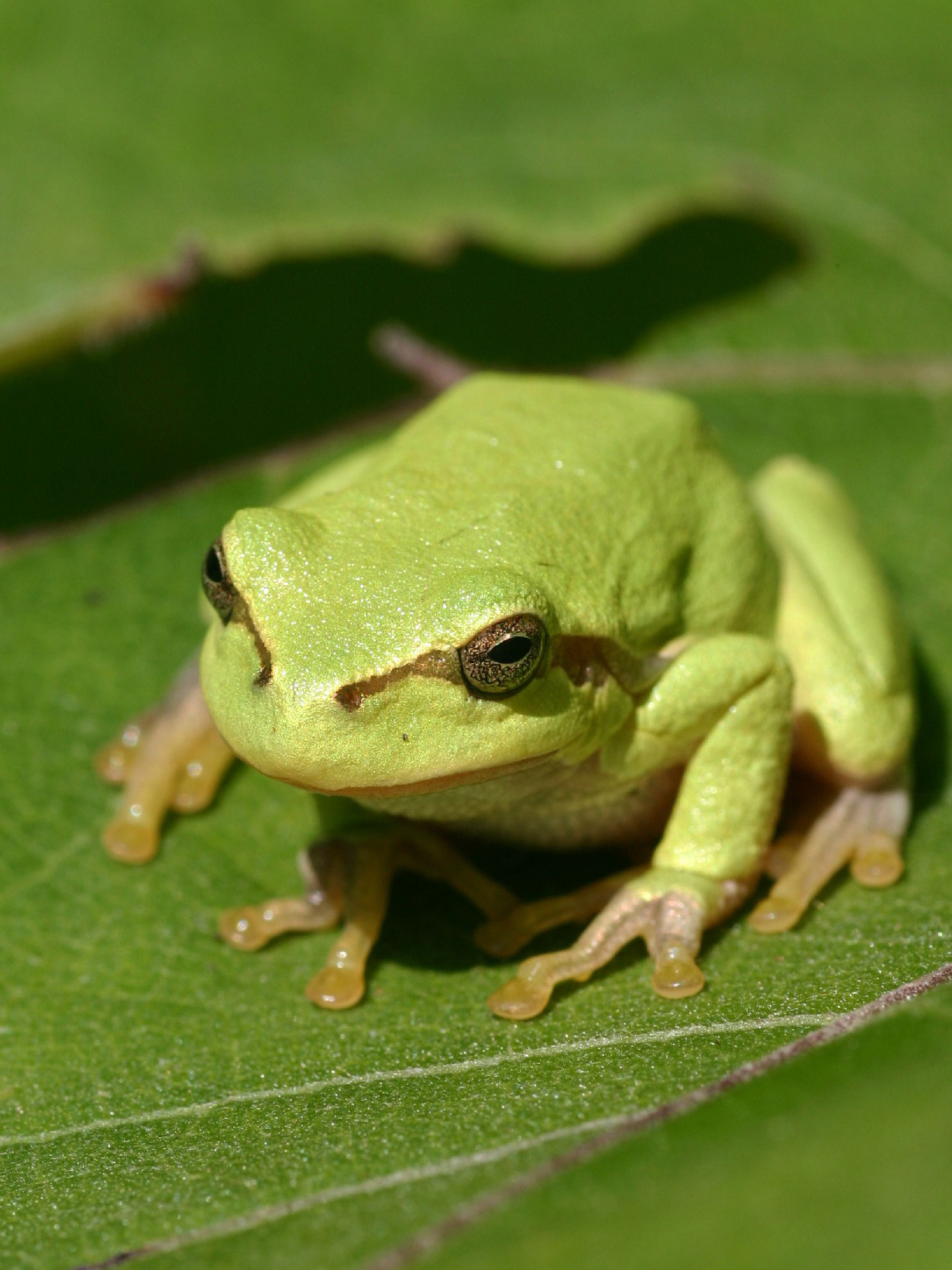
- European tree frog, Hyla arborea

Scientific classification
- Kingdom: Animalia
- Phylum: Chordata
- Class: Amphibia
- Order: Anura
- Family: Hylidae
- Subfamily: Hylinae
- Genus: Hyla; Laurenti, 1768

Type species
- Hyla viridis

Species
- See text

Synonyms
- Calamita Schneider, 1799; Calamites Schneider, 1799; Dendrohyas Wagler, 1830; Discodactylus Michahelles, 1833; Hyas Wagler, 1830; Hylanus Rafinesque, 1815; Hylaria Rafinesque, 1814; Ranetta Garsault, 1764

= Hyla =

Hyla Temporal range: 37.2–0 Ma Eocene to recent

Genus of amphibians

Hyla is a genus of frogs in the tree frog family Hylidae. As traditionally defined, it was a wastebasket genus with more than 300 species found in Europe, Asia, Africa, and across the Americas. After a major revision of the family, most of these have been moved to other genera so that Hyla now only contains 17 extant (living) species from Europe, northern Africa and Asia. The earliest known fossil member of this genus is †Hyla swanstoni from the Eocene of Saskatchewan, Canada, but its designation to Hyla happened before the major revision, meaning that its position needs confirmation.

The genus was established by Josephus Nicolaus Laurenti in 1768. It was named after Hylas in Greek mythology, the companion of Hercules. The name is unusual in that – though Laurenti knew that Hylas was male – the name is unambiguously treated in the feminine grammatical gender for reasons unknown. The etymology of the name is also often incorrectly given as being derived from the Greek word ὕλη (hūlē, "forest" or "wood").

== Living species ==
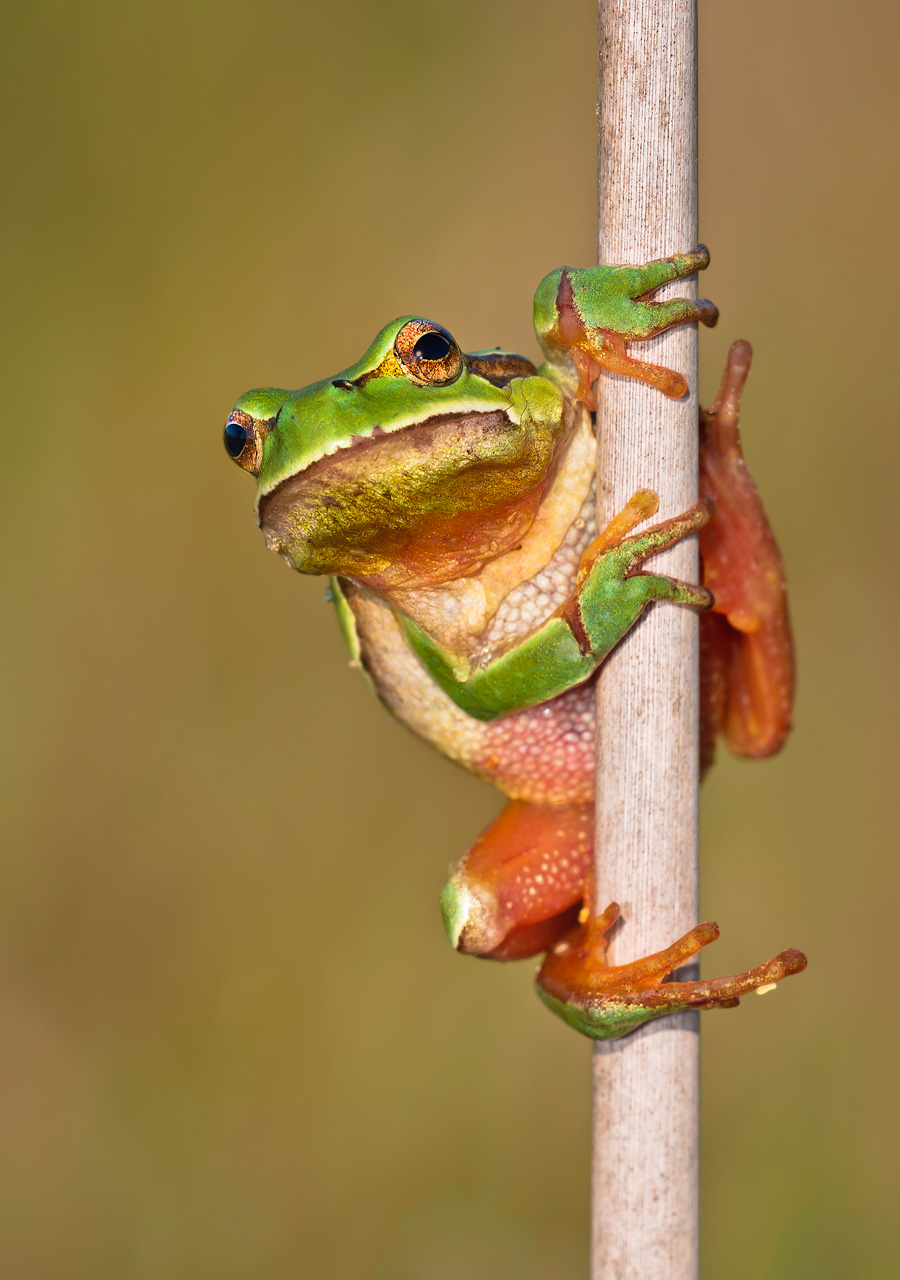
Hyla molleri

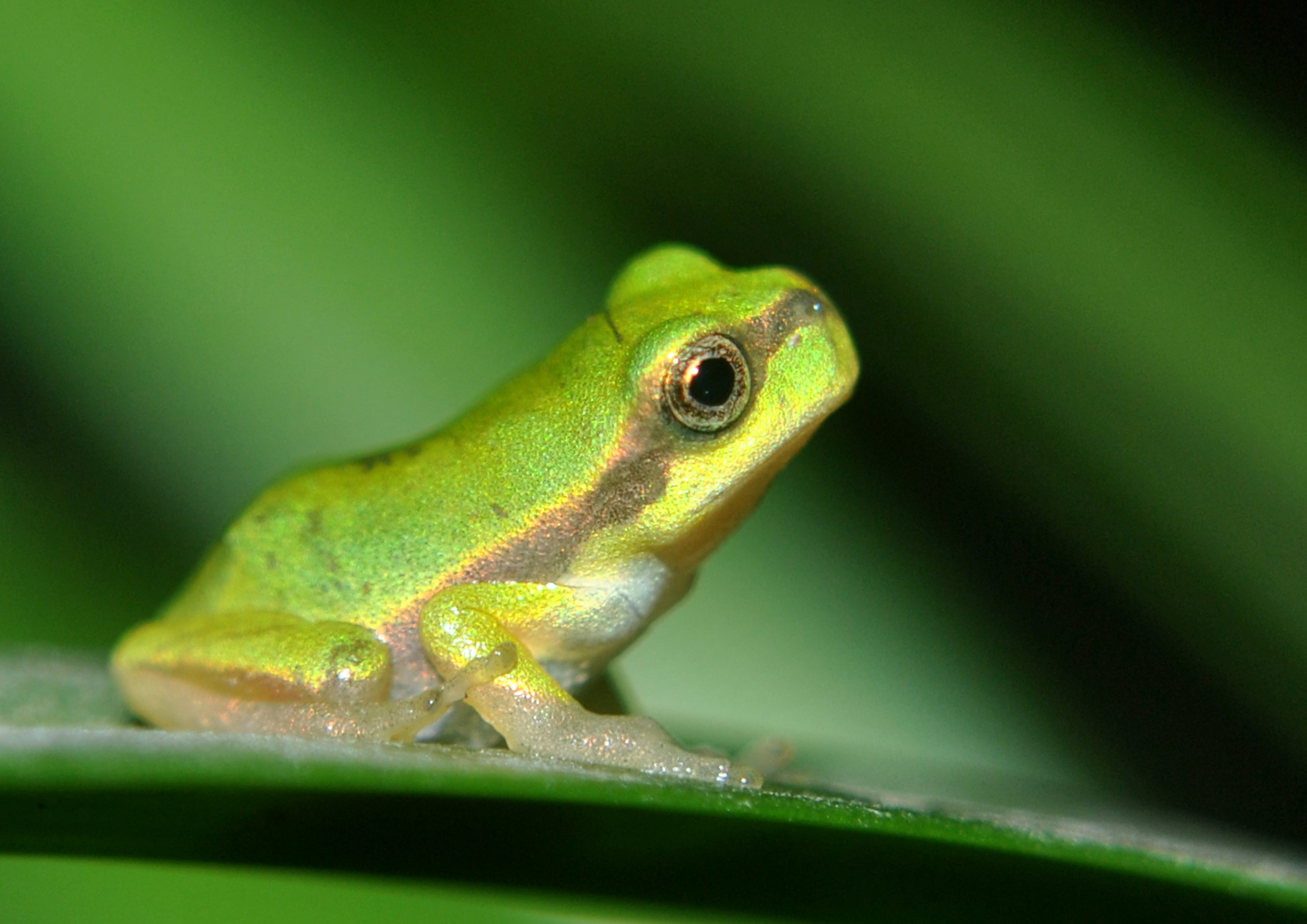
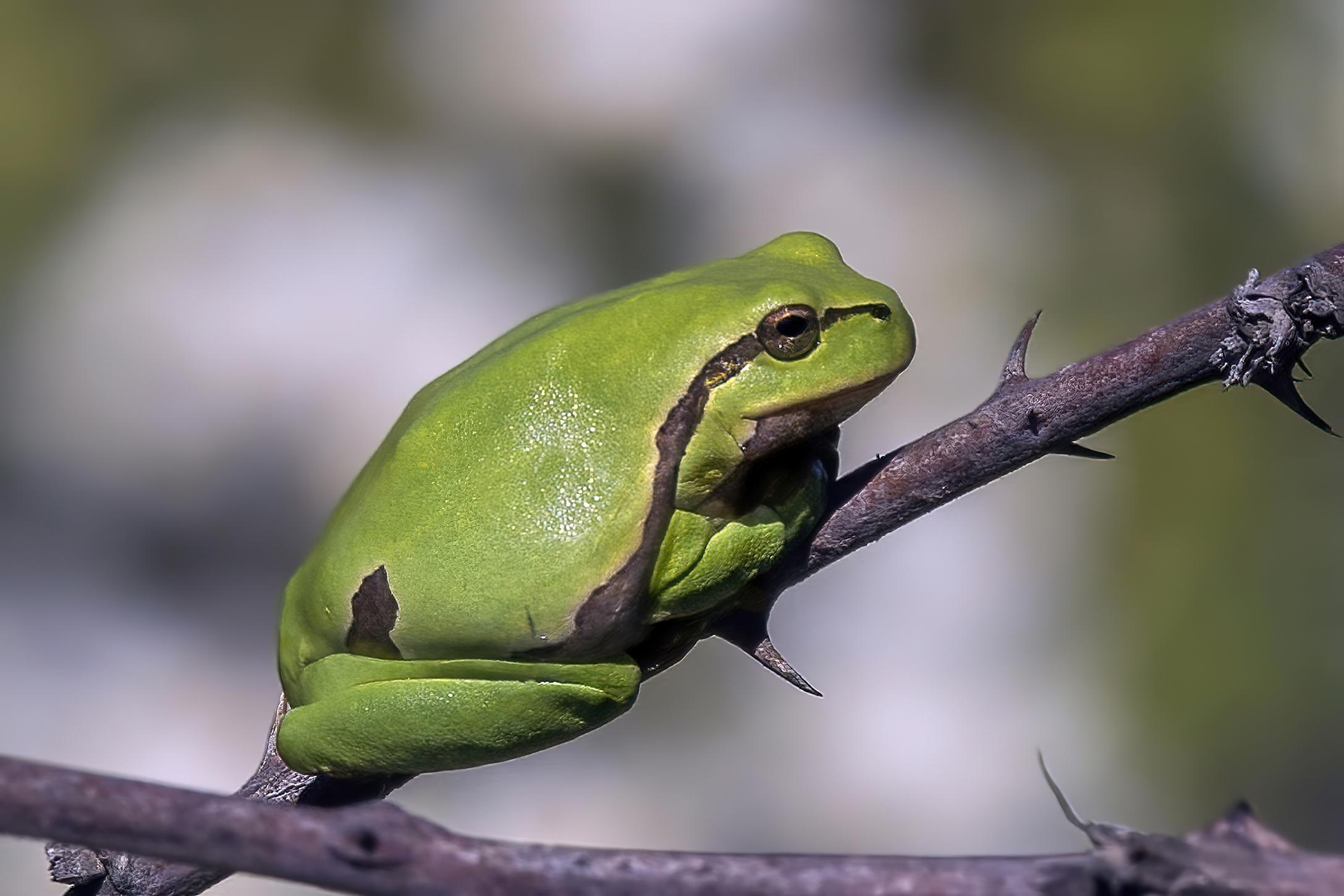
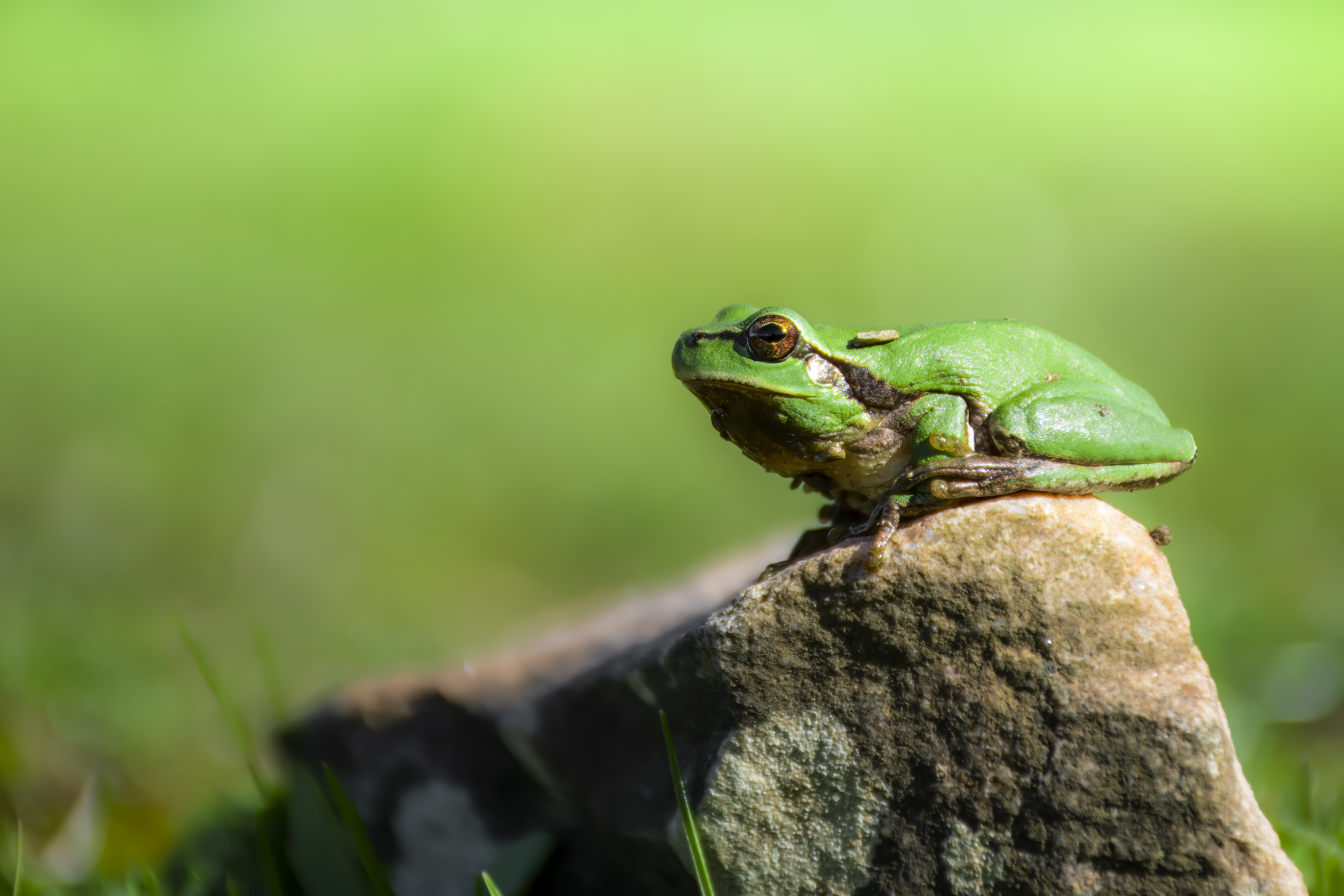
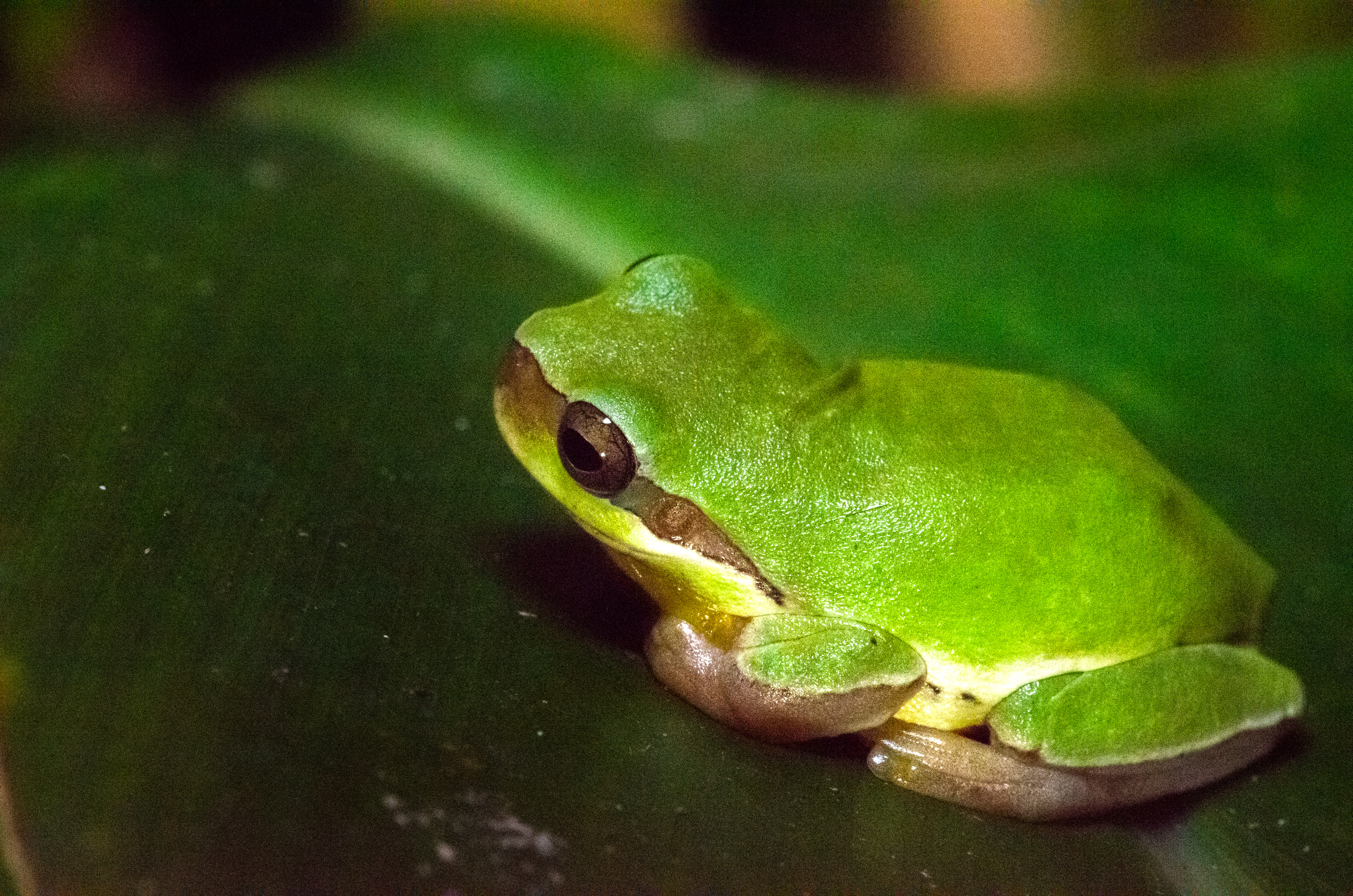
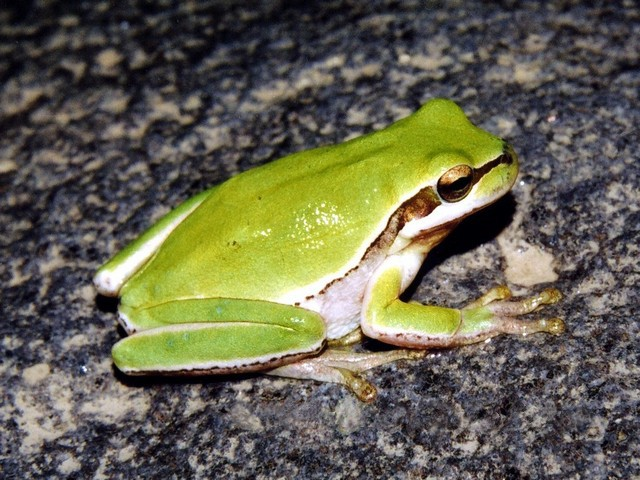
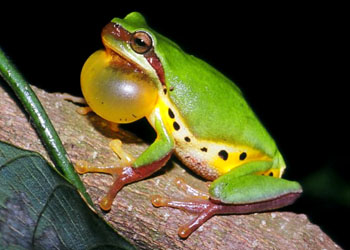
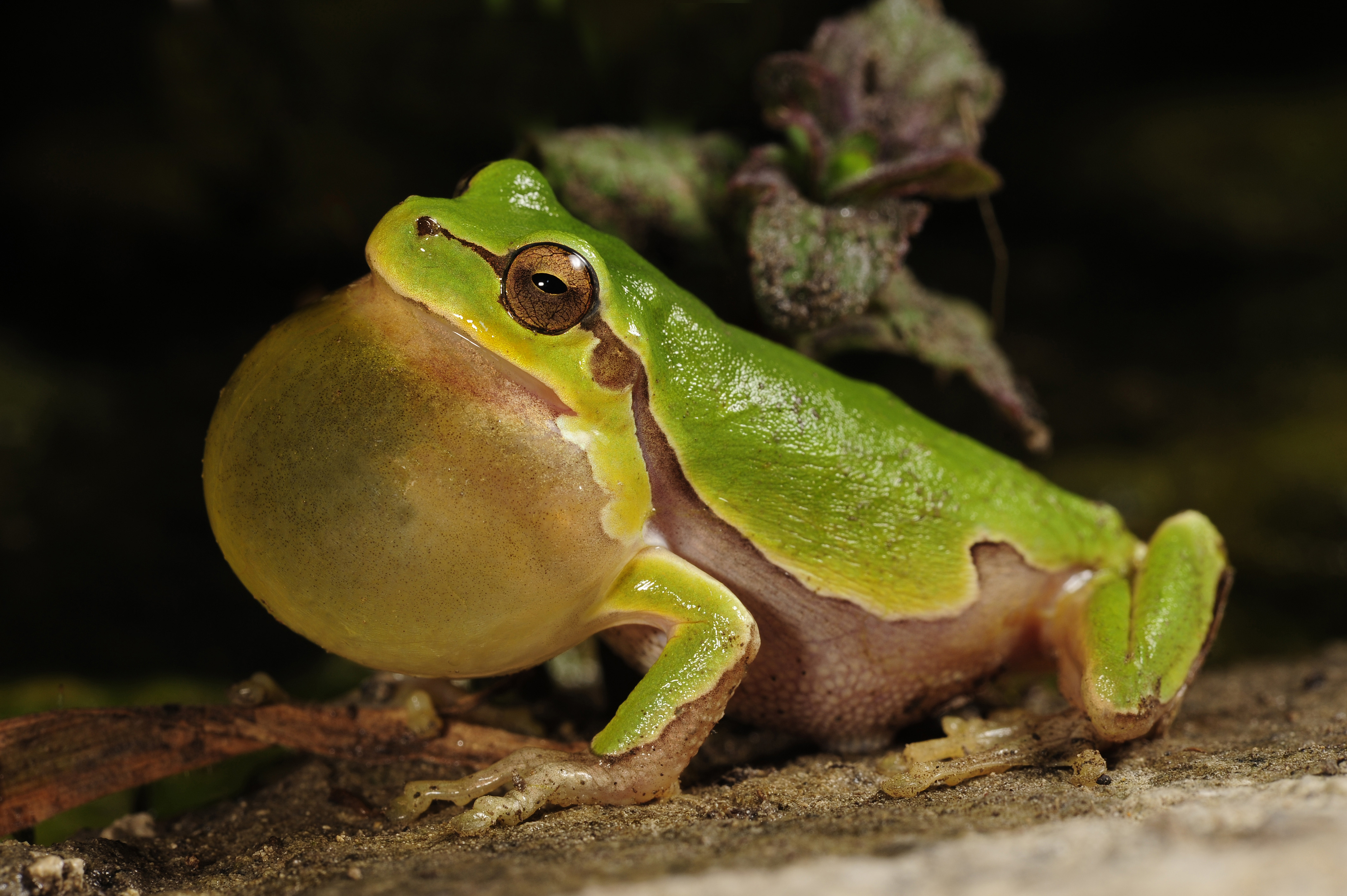
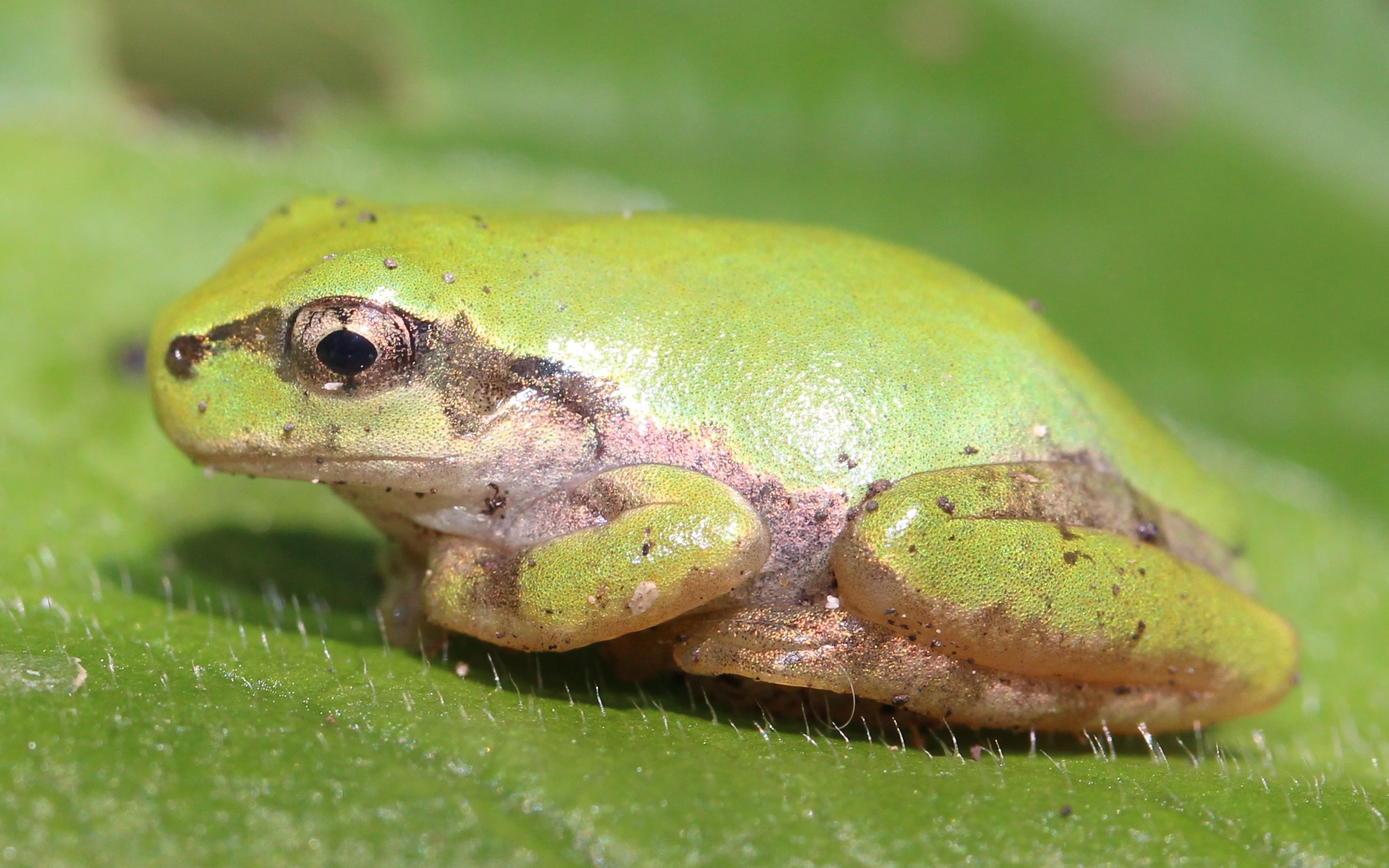
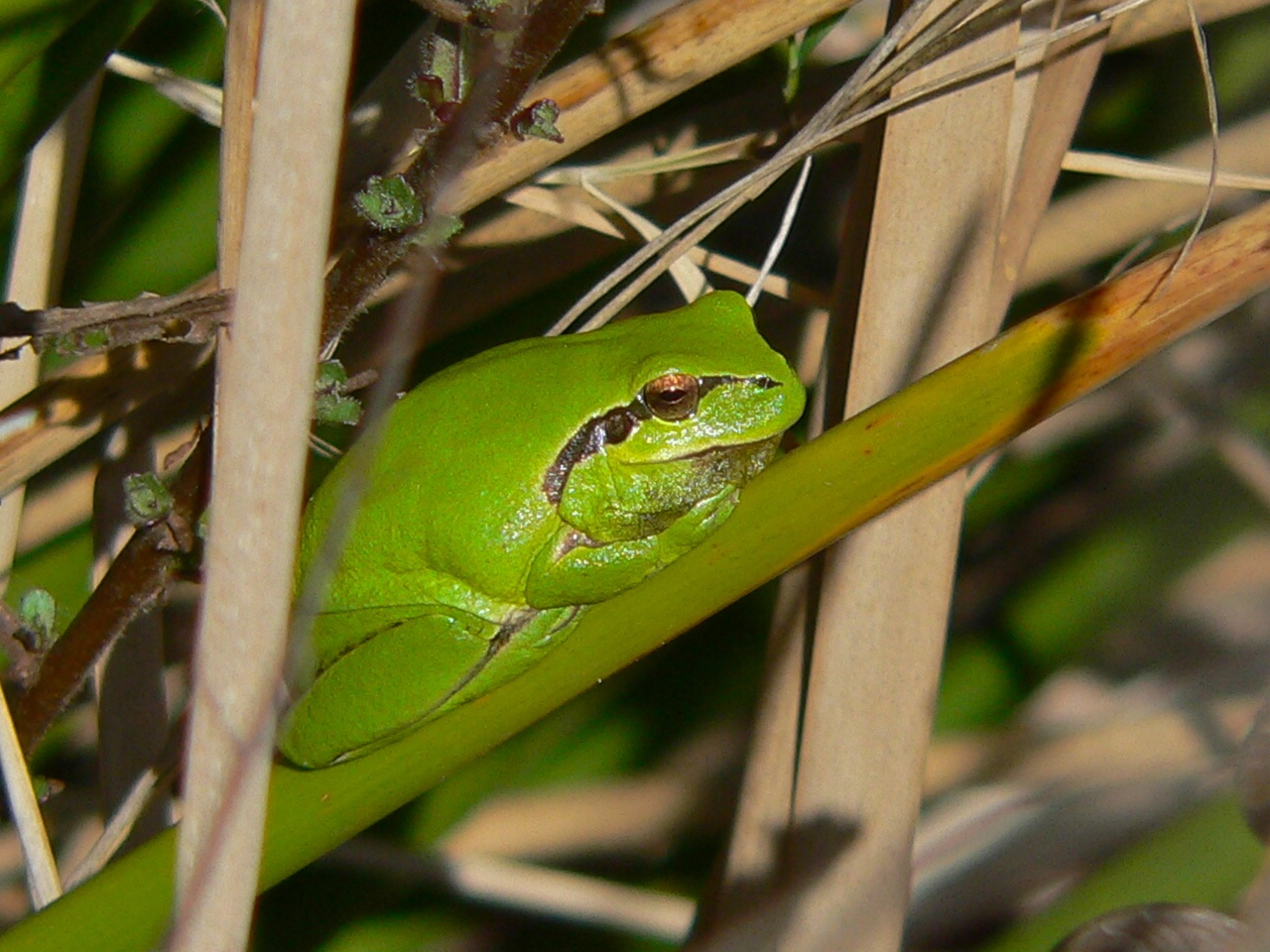
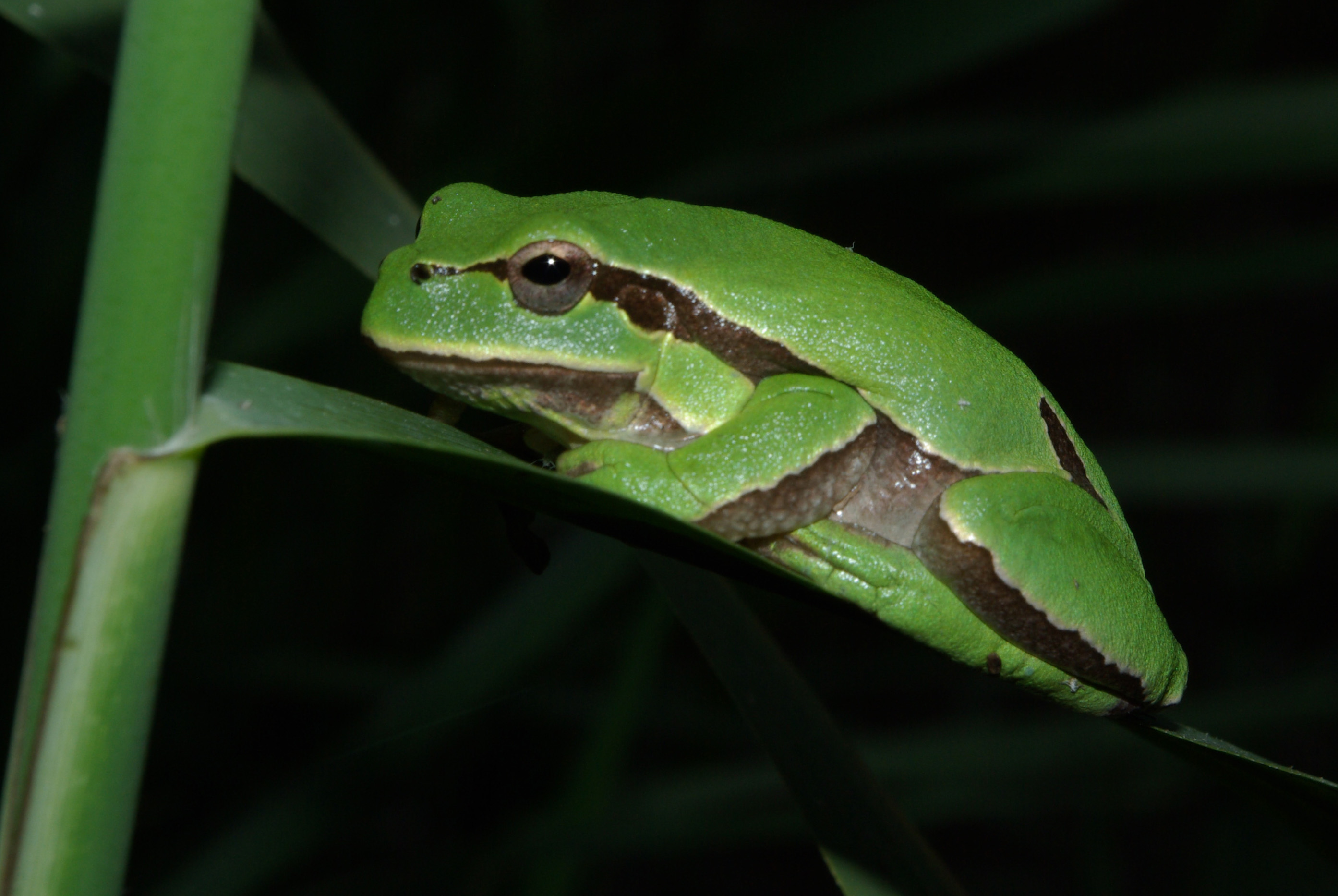
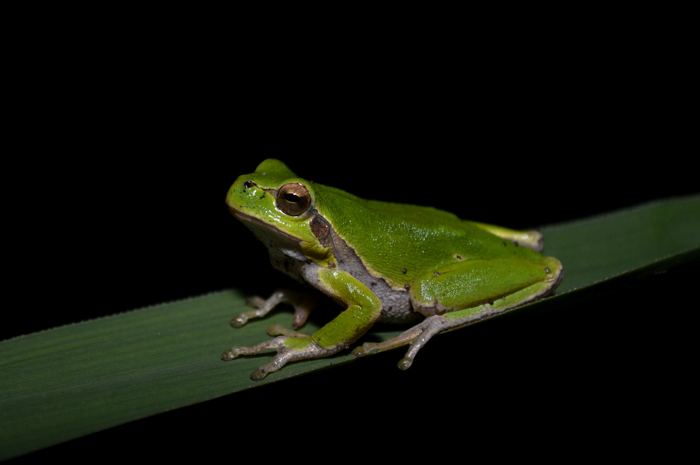
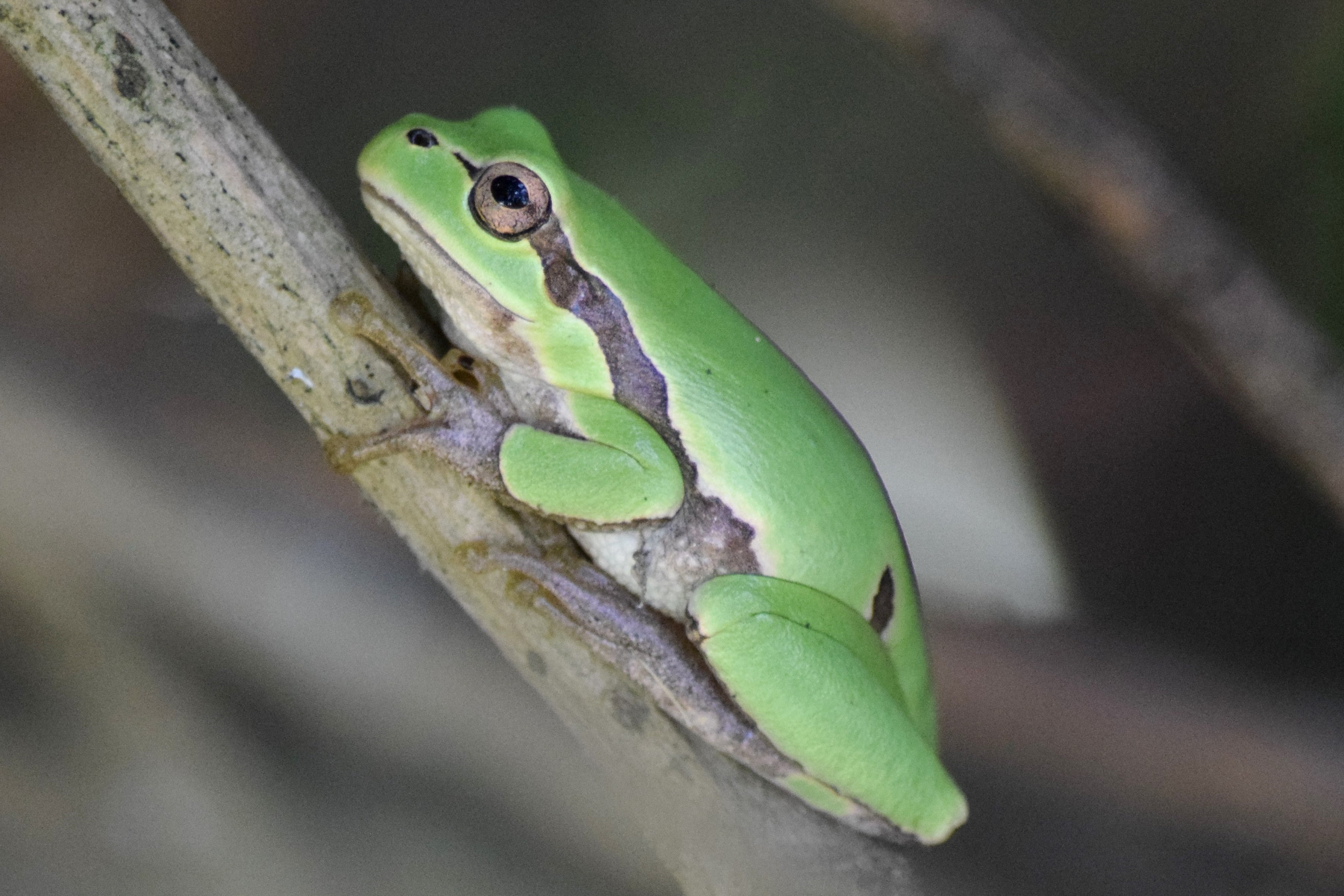
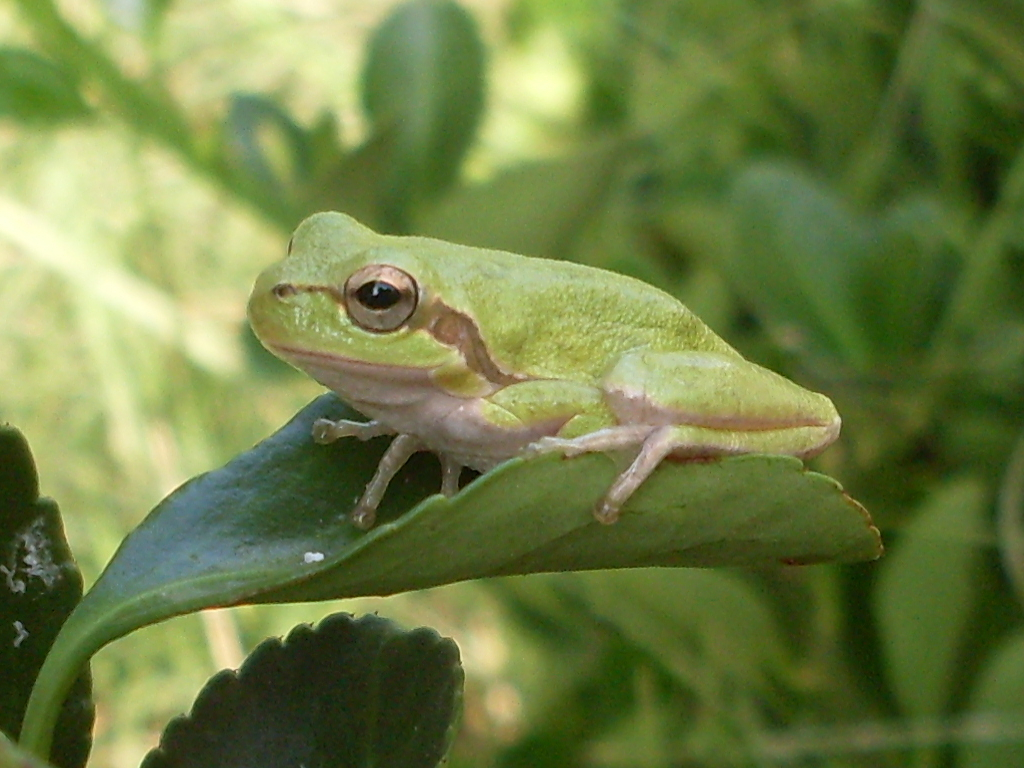
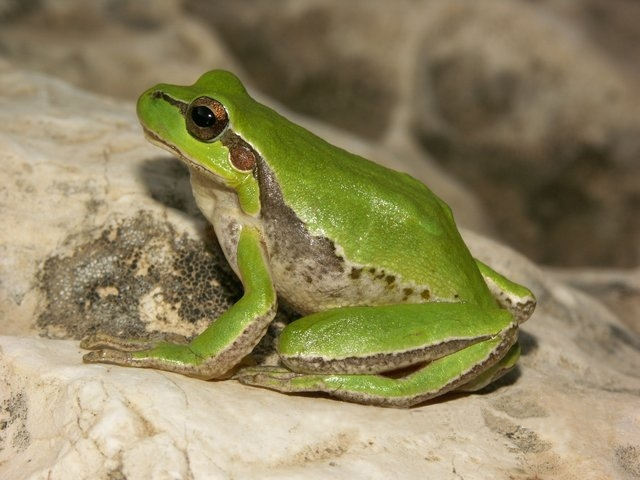
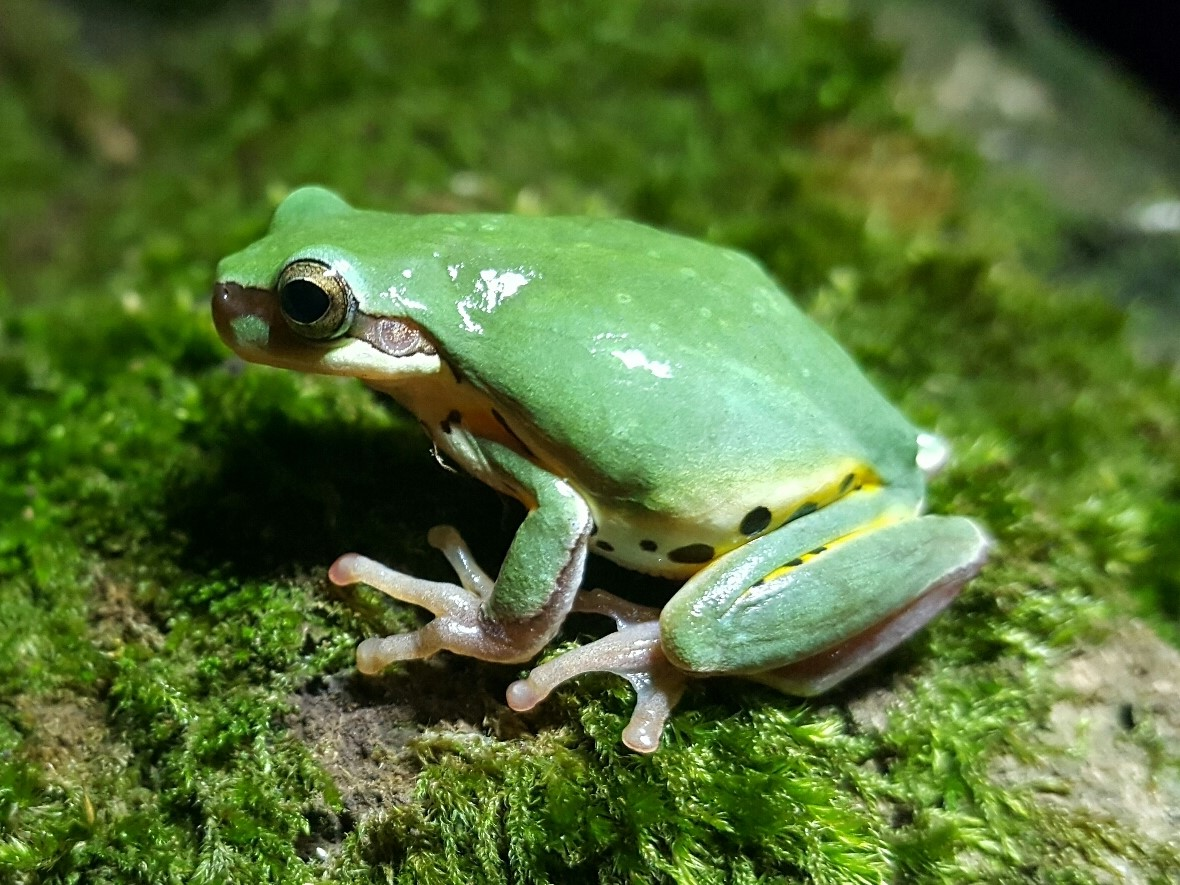
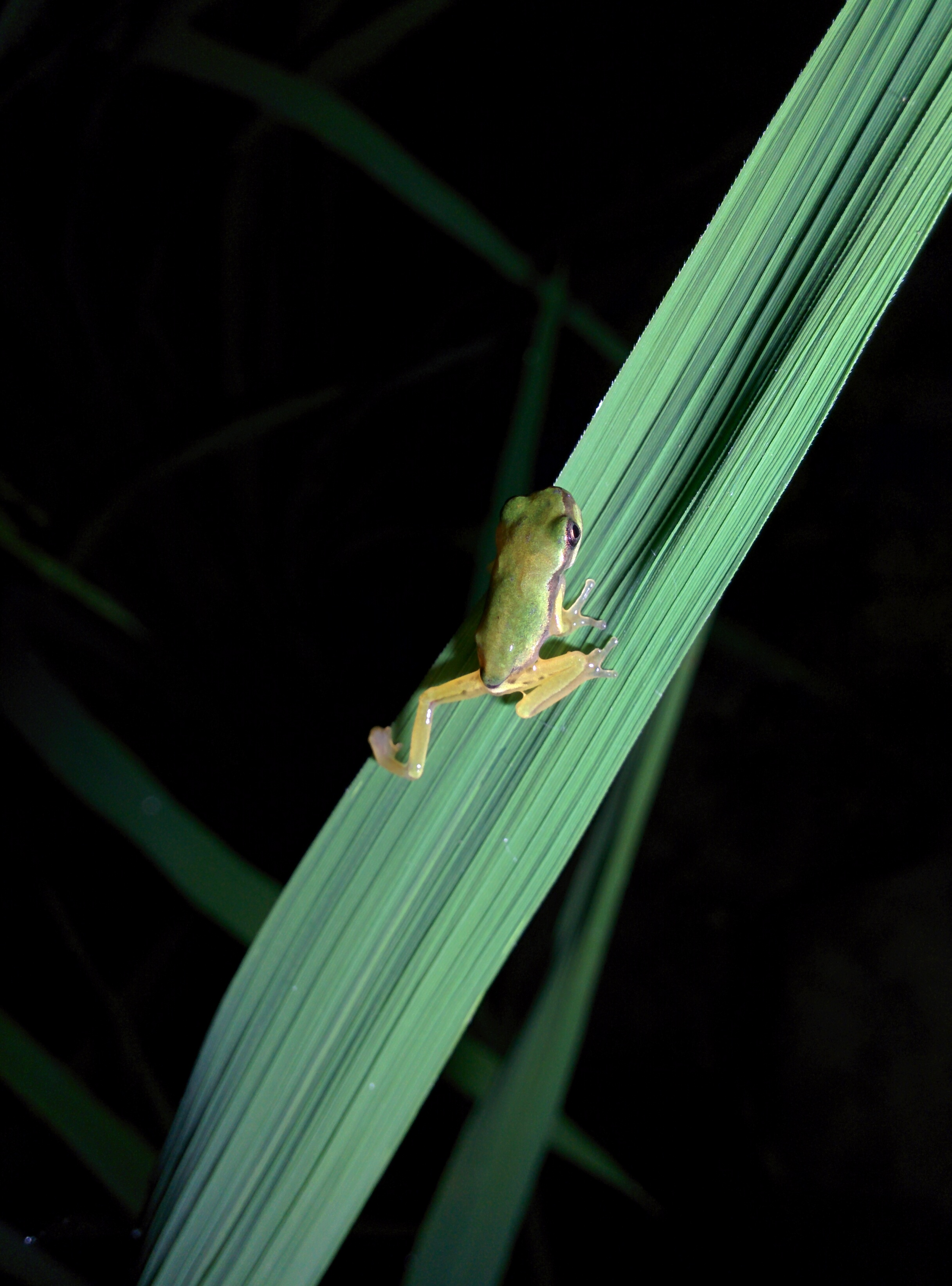
Image	Binomial name	Common name	Distribution
	H. annectans (Jerdon, 1870)	Jerdon's tree frog	northeast India (Assam, Nagaland, Manipur, and Meghalaya), northern Myanmar, and northern montane Vietnam and southwestern and central China (Yunnan, Guizhou, Sichuan, Hunan)
	H. arborea (Linnaeus, 1758)	European tree frog	Albania; Armenia; Austria; Azerbaijan; Belarus; Belgium; Bosnia and Herzegovina; Bulgaria; Croatia; Cyprus; the Czech Republic; Denmark; France; Georgia; Germany; Greece; Hungary; Israel (found in the Ayalon Valley); Italy; Liechtenstein; Lithuania; Luxembourg; Macedonia, the Republic of; Moldova; Montenegro; the Netherlands; Poland; Portugal; Romania; the Russian Federation; Serbia; Slovakia; Slovenia; Sweden; Switzerland; Turkey; Ukraine.
	H. carthaginiensis Dufresnes, Beddek, Skorinov, Fumagalli, Perrin, Crochet, and Litvinchuk, 2019	Carthaginian tree frog	northeastern Algeria and northwestern Tunisia.
	H. chinensis Günther, 1858	Common Chinese tree frog	southeastern and eastern China and in Taiwan
	H. felixarabica Gvoždík, Moravec, Klütsch & Kotlík, 2010	Arabian tree frog	Israel, Jordan, Saudi Arabia, Yemen, Syria and Lebanon.
	H. hallowellii Thompson, 1912	Hallowell's tree frog	Japan
	H. intermedia Boulenger, 1882	Italian tree frog	Italy, Slovenia, Switzerland, and possibly San Marino.
	H. japonica Günther, 1859 (Some studies consider it as species of Dryophytes)	Japanese tree frog	Japan, China and Korea
	H. meridionalis Boettger, 1874	Mediterranean tree frog	south-west Europe and north-west Africa
	H. molleri Bedriaga, 1889	Moller's tree frog	Iberian Peninsula and southwesternmost France.
	H. orientalis Bedriaga, 1890	Oriental tree frog	Asia Minor and southeastern Europe
	H. perrini Dufresnes, Mazepa, Rodrigues, Brelsford, Litvinchuk, Sermier, Lavanchy, Betto-Colliard, Blaser, Borzée, Cavoto, Fabre, Ghali, Grossen, Horn, Leuenberger, Phillips, Saunders, Savary, Maddalena, Stöck, Dubey, Canestrelli, and Jeffries, 2018	Perrin's tree frog	northern Italy, Switzerland (Ticino) and Slovenia
	H. sanchiangensis Pope, 1929	San Chiang tree frog	China(Fujian, Guangdong, Guangxi, Guizhou, Anhui, Zhejiang, Hunan, Hubei, and Jiangxi)
	H. sarda (De Betta, 1853)	Sardinian tree frog	Corsica, Sardinia, and the Tuscan Archipelago.
	H. savignyi Audouin, 1827	Middle East tree frog	Bulgaria, Armenia, Azerbaijan, Cyprus, Egypt, Georgia, Iran, Iraq, Israel, Jordan, Lebanon, Saudi Arabia, Syria, Turkey, and Yemen.
	H. simplex Boettger, 1901	Annam tree frog	southern China, Vietnam, and Laos
	H. tsinlingensis Liu and Hu in Hu, Zhao, and Liu, 1966	Shensi tree frog	China.
	H. zhaopingensis Tang and Zhang, 1984	Zhaoping tree frog	China.

== Mating systems ==
=== Female choice based on male calling ===
The mating systems across most species of Hyla largely feature female choice based on male calling effort. The specific parameter of calling effort that is selected for can vary from species to species, however. In H. versicolor, for example, females show preference for calls of longer duration. The selection of males which have calls of longer duration has shown to only be advantageous at low densities. This suggests that preference plasticity, based on environmental context, is beneficial. Comparatively, males of H. arborea achieve a higher rate of mating success with increased chorus attendance, that is the number of nights spent calling at a given breeding site. Moreover, increased chorus attendance carries with it a higher energy expenditure and risk of predation. Therefore, it may seem intuitive that males with higher chorus attendance are less likely to survive to the next breeding season. Conversely, these males are more likely to survive. This suggests that the fitness of these males is high enough to overcome the costs associated with chorus attendance. This provides evidence for chorus attendance as an indicator of mate quality in H. arborea.

=== Male-male contests ===
Although it is studied less frequently than female choice, sexual selection influenced by male-male intrasexual competition does exist in certain species of Hyla. Males of H. versicolor produce conspicuous advertisement calls in large groups at territories known to females. This behavior, known as lekking, is common in many species of Hyla. In order to broadcast a clear acoustic communication to a female, males require distinct calling spaces within their respective leks. When males infringe upon the calling space of one another, aggressive interactions may occur. Males of H. versicolor may choose to lower costs of aggressive encounters by first assessing one another's resource holding potential. In simple terms, the resource holding potential (RHP) of an individual is its ability to win a fight. RHP can be based on a number of factors, including mass, size, weaponry, etc. In H. versicolor, the question of what determines an individual's RHP still stands. Aggressive interactions of this species are hard to observe within natural environments, because they occur briefly and infrequently. Research has suggested that RHP in this species is not based on body size, however these findings were not based on in situ observations, but instead on the findings of a manipulated experiment.

=== Indirect selection ===
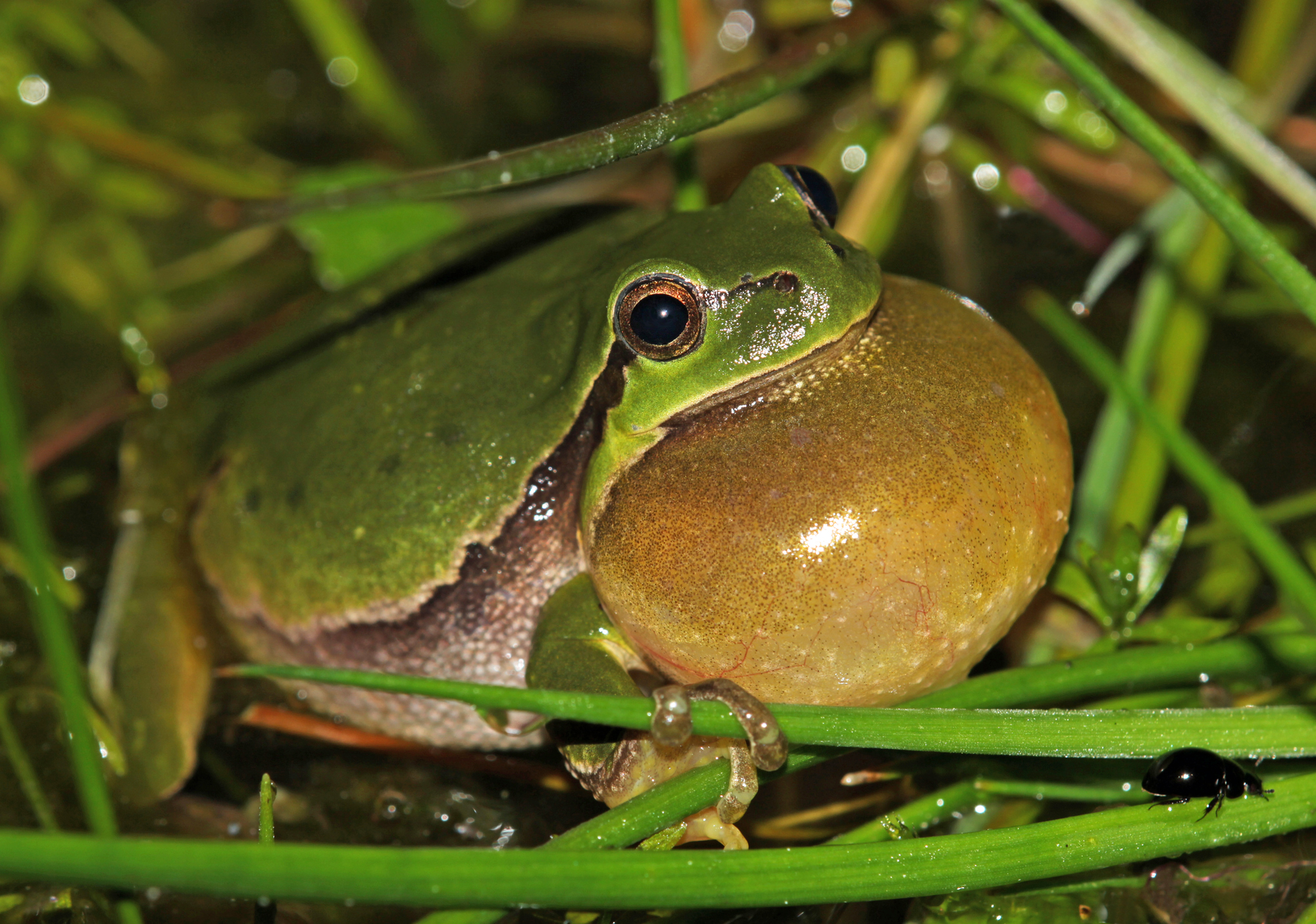
A calling H. arborea male with a distended vocal sac.

In terms of sexual selection, indirect selection refers to the selection of a specific trait based on its genetic correlation to overall fitness. H. arborea is a nocturnal species which depends on calling by males for female mate choice. In addition to its ability to detect acoustic communications, H. arborea, as well as most other Anuran species, possess specialized visual systems that function particularly well in low light. This visual system allows for detection of observable male traits that could factor into female mate choice. Research has shown that H. arborea females have a preference for males with more conspicuous vocal sac coloration. It is postulated that this preference may assist in localization and detection of males by searching females. However, vocal sac pigmentation is dictated by carotenoid levels, which must be ingested through food intake. Thus, the presence of conspicuous vocal sac coloration could in turn signal higher male foraging ability and fitness.
