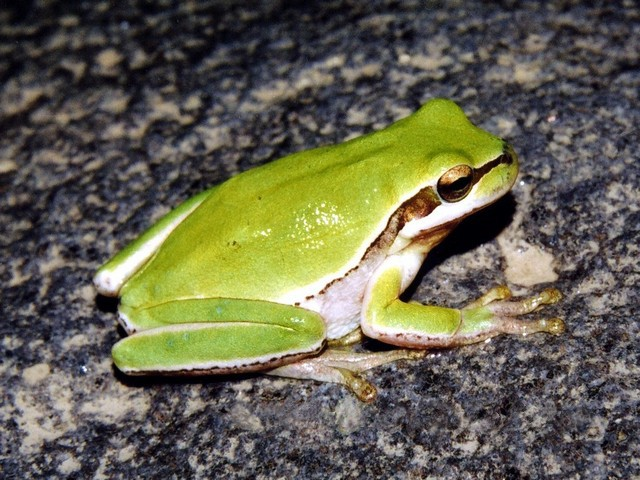

Scientific classification
- Kingdom: Animalia
- Phylum: Chordata
- Class: Amphibia
- Order: Anura
- Family: Hylidae
- Genus: Hyla
- Species: H. felixarabica

Binomial name
- Hyla felixarabica Gvoždík, Kotlík, and Moravec, 2010

= Hyla felixarabica =

Species of frog

Hyla felixarabica, the Arabian tree frog, is a frog in the family Hylidae, endemic to the Middle East. It has been observed in Israel, Jordan, Saudi Arabia, Yemen, Syria and Lebanon.

Scientists speculate that there are two separate groups of Arabian tree frogs—one in the hills of Yemen and the Asir Mountains of Saudi Arabia, and another in Syria, Israel and the hills of Jordan.

Previously, researchers thought that this separation was conspecific to the Middle East tree frog (Hyla savignyi), but it is not; now, it is believed that the Arabian tree frog separated from the Middle East tree frog population some 8.4 million years ago, around when the Dead Sea Rift formed.

== Original description ==
- Petr Kotlík (2010). "Phylogeography of the Middle Eastern tree frogs (Hyla, Hylidae, Amphibia) as inferred from nuclear and mitochondrial DNA variation, with a description of a new species". Molecular Phylogenetics and Evolution (Abstract). 55 (3): 1146. Bibcode:2010MolPE..55.1146G. doi:10.1016/j.ympev.2010.03.015.
