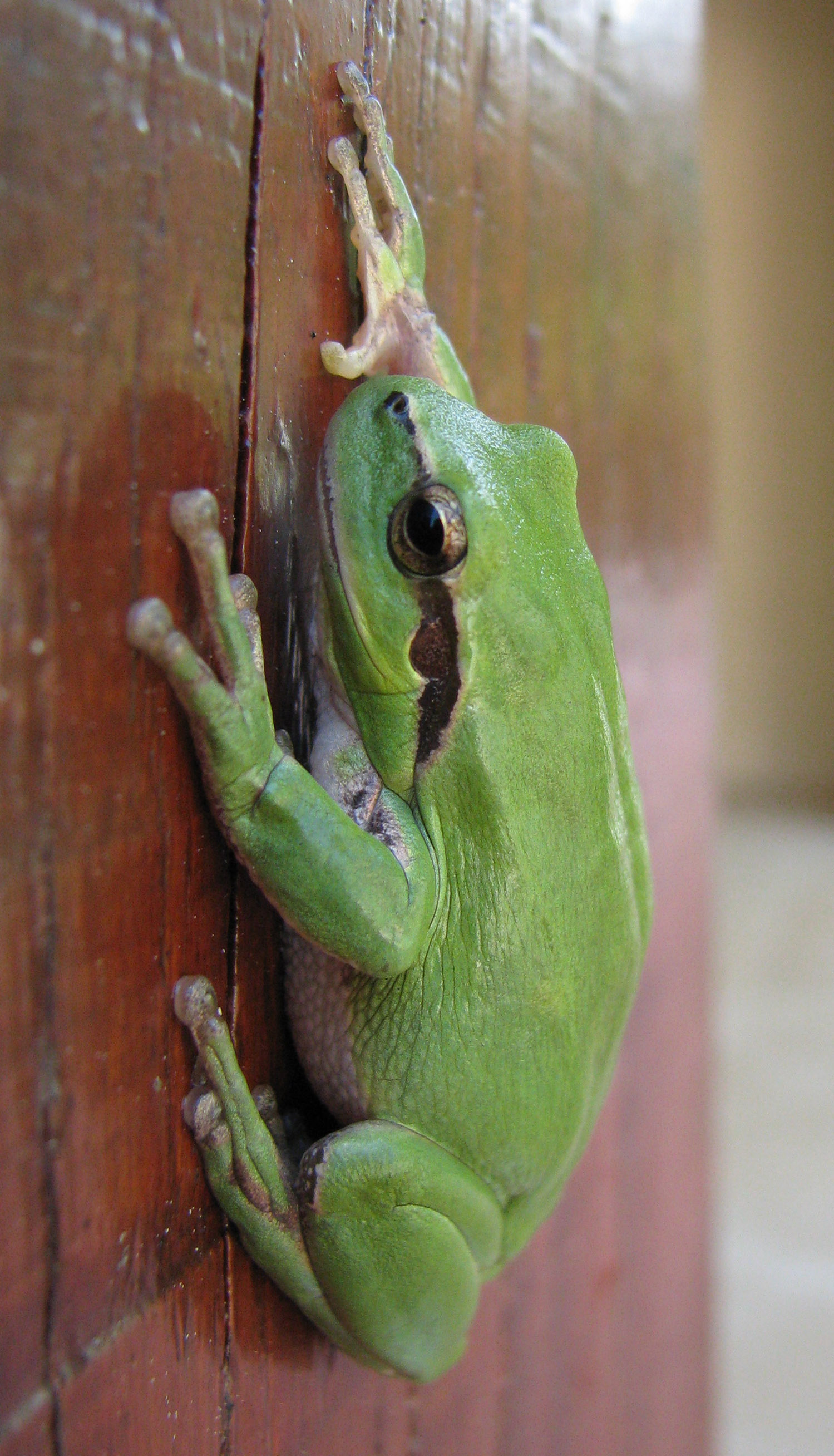

Conservation status
- Least Concern (IUCN 3.1)

Scientific classification
- Kingdom: Animalia
- Phylum: Chordata
- Class: Amphibia
- Order: Anura
- Family: Hylidae
- Genus: Hyla
- Species: H. meridionalis

Binomial name
- Hyla meridionalis Boettger, 1874
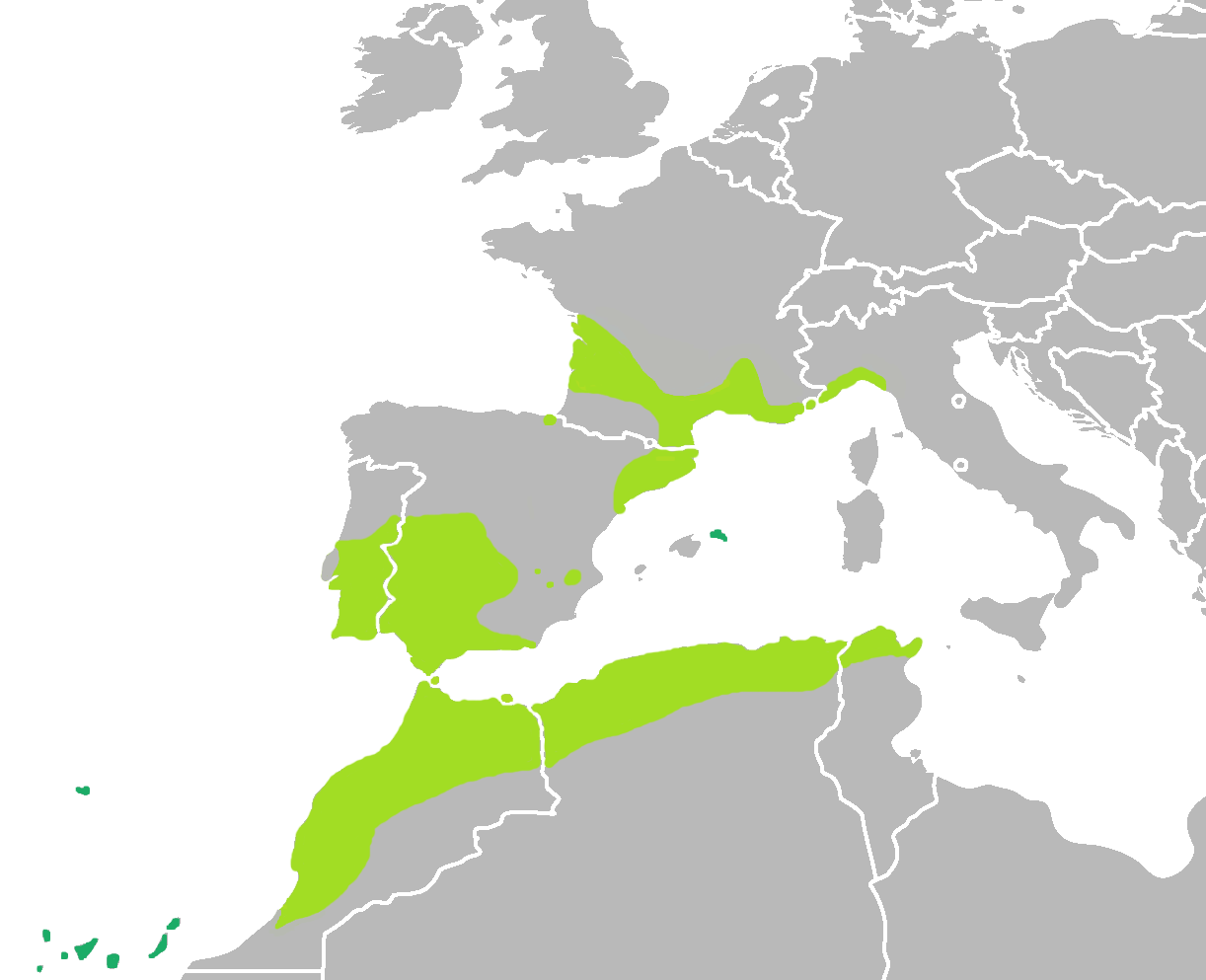
- Range of Mediterranean tree frog

Synonyms
- Hyla africana Ahl, 1924; Hyla arborea subsp. meridionalis Boettger, 1874; Hyla arborea var. meridionalis Böttger, 1874; Hyla barytonus Herón-Royer, 1884; Hyla perezii Boscá, 1880; Hyla viridis subsp. meridionalis Boettger, 1874

= Mediterranean tree frog =

Species of amphibian

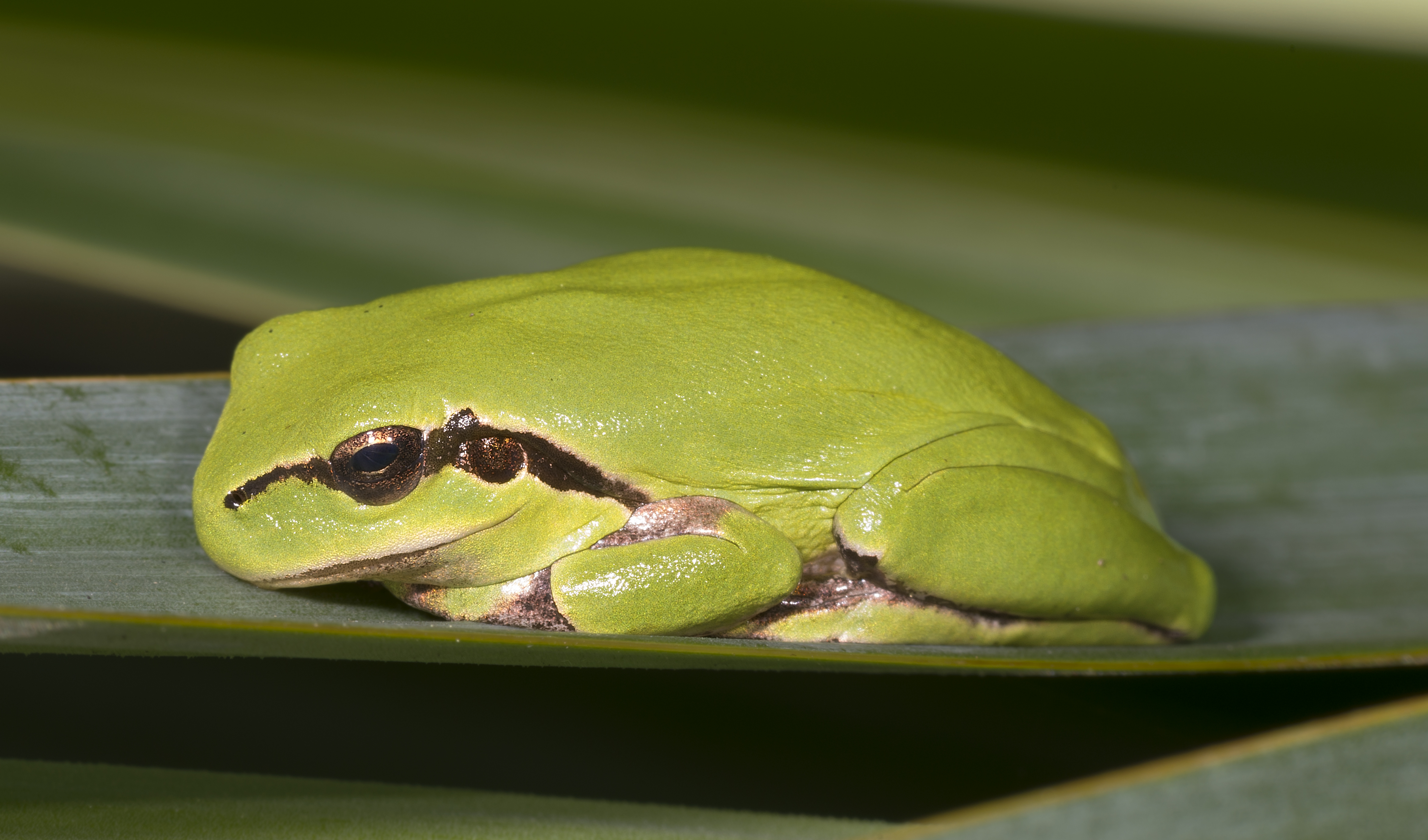
Rest position - Haute-Garonne France

The Mediterranean tree frog (Hyla meridionalis), or stripeless tree frog, is a species of frog found in south-west Europe and north-west Africa. It resembles the European tree frog, but is larger (some females are up to 65 millimetres (2.6 in) long), has longer hind legs, and the flank stripe only reaches to the front legs (often starting at the eyes, not at the nostrils). The croaking resembles that of H. arborea, but it is deeper and slower.

The Hyla meridionalis generally breed from the end of March through the beginning of July; their breeding is dependent on a few variables, including water availability. This tree frog species has a larval period of 15 days.

== Distribution ==
This frog is found in central and southern Portugal, Spain (from Catalonia to Andalusia and Extremadura), southern France, northern Italy (only Liguria), Morocco, northern Algeria and northern Tunisia. It also has ancient introduced populations in Madeira and the Canary Islands and a recent introduction in Menorca.
