= Edward Hallowell (herpetologist) =

American herpetologist and physician

- Born: 1808
- Died: February 20, 1860 (aged 51–52)
- Scientific career
- Fields: Herpetology; Medicine

Edward Hallowell (1808 – February 20, 1860) was an American herpetologist and medical doctor.

He studied and practiced medicine in Philadelphia. He also was a herpetologist who described 61 new species of reptiles.

In 1851, Hallowell was elected as a member of the American Philosophical Society.

Hallowell is commemorated in the scientific names of two species of frogs: Hyla hallowellii and Leptodactylus hallowelli.

== Publications in the Proceedings of the Academy of Natural Sciences of Philadelphia ==
- (1844). "Description of New Species of African reptiles". 2: 169-172.
- (1844). "Description of new species of Reptiles from Africa". 2: 118-120.
- (1844). "Descriptions of new species of African Reptiles". 2: 58-62.
- (1841). "Description of a new species of Chameleon from Western African". 1: 111-115.
- (1845). "Descriptions of reptiles from South America, supposed to be New". 2: 241-247.
- (1845). "Descriptions of new species of African Reptiles". 2: 247-250.
- (1847). "Description of a New Species of Coluber inhabiting the United States". 3: 278-281.
- (1847). "On the Horned Viper of Western Africa". 3: 319-321.
- (1848). "Description of two new species of Onychocephalus, from the Western Coast of Africa". 4: 59-61 + plate.
- (1848). "Description of a species of Eryx, from Madras". 4: 184 + plate.
- (1848). ["Remarks on the young of Coluber venustus "]. 4: 245.
- (1852). "Descriptions of new Species of Reptiles inhabiting North America". 6: 177-182.
- (1852). "Descriptions of New Species of Reptiles from Oregon". 6: 182-183.
- (1852). "On a new Genus and two new species of African Serpents". 6: 203-205.
- (1852). "On a New Genus and three New Species of Reptiles inhabiting North America". 6: 206-209.
- (1853). "On some New Reptiles from California". 6: 236-238.
- (1852). "Description of new species of Reptilia from Western Africa". 6: 62-65.
- (1854). "Descriptions of new Reptiles from Guinea". 7: 193-194.
- (1854). "Description of new Reptiles from California". 7: 91-97.
- (1854). "On a genus and species of serpent from Honduras, presumed to be new". 7: 97.
- (1854). "Remarks on the Geographical distribution of Reptiles, with descriptions of several species supposed to be new, and corrections of former papers". 7: 98-105.
- (1854). "Notices of new Reptiles from Texas". 7: 192-193.
- (1856). ["A large collection of living specimens of Sternothaerus odoratus "]. 8: 106-108.
- (1856). "On several new species of Reptiles in the Collection of the Academy of Natural Sciences". 8: 153-156.
- (1856). "Notes on the Reptiles in the collection of the Academy of Natural Sciences of Philad’a". 8: 221-238.
- (1856). "Notice of a Collection of Reptiles from Kansas and Nebraska, presented to the Academy of Natural Sciences, by Dr. Hammond, U. S. A." 8: 238-253.
- (1856). "Note on the collection of Reptiles from the neighborhood of San Antonio, Texas, recently presented to the Academy of Natural Sciences by Dr. A. Heermann". 8: 306-310.
- (1856). "Description of a new genus of Colubriform Serpents from California". 8: 310-311.
- (1857). "Description of several new North American Reptiles". 9: 215-216.
- (1857). "Notice of a collection of reptiles from the Gaboon country, West Africa, recently presented to the Academy of Natural Sciences of Philadelphia, by Dr. Henry A. Ford". 9: 48-72.
- (1856). "Notes on the Reptiles in the collection of the Museum of the Academy of Natural Sciences". 8: 146-153.
- (1860). "Report upon the Reptilia of the North Pacific Exploring Expedition, under command of Capt. John Rogers, U. S. N." 12: 480-510.

== Source ==
- Kelly, Howard A., Burrage, Walter L. (1928). Dictionary of American Medical Biography: Lives of Eminent Physicians of the United States and Canada, from the Earliest Times. New York: D. Appleton and Company.

== See also ==
- Category:Taxa named by Edward Hallowell (herpetologist)
