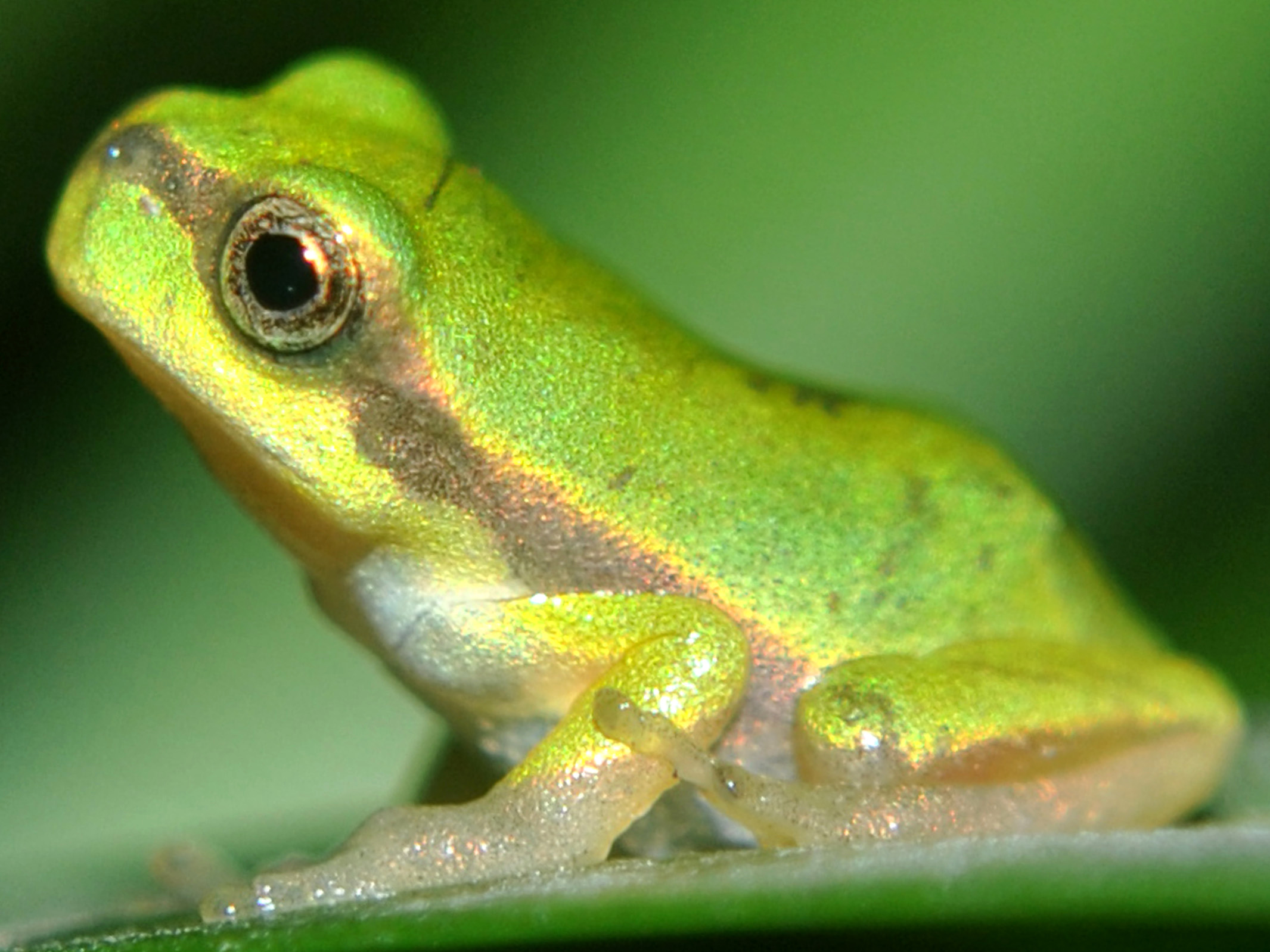

Conservation status
- Least Concern (IUCN 3.1)

Scientific classification
- Kingdom: Animalia
- Phylum: Chordata
- Class: Amphibia
- Order: Anura
- Family: Hylidae
- Genus: Hyla
- Species: H. annectans

Binomial name
- Hyla annectans (Jerdon, 1870)

Synonyms
- Polypedates annectans Jerdon, 1870; Hyla annectens incorrect subsequent spelling; Hyla annectans gongshanensis Yang, Su, and Li, 1983; Hyla gongshanensis Yang, Su, and Li, 1983; Hyla annectans wulingensis Shen, 1997; Hyla annectans jingdongensis Fei and Ye in Ye, Fei, Li, and Li, 2000; Hyla annectans tengchongensis Ye, Fei, and Li in Ye, Fei, Li, and Li, 2000; Hyla annectans chuanxiensis Ye and Fei in Ye, Fei, Li, and Li, 2000

= Hyla annectans =

Species of amphibian

Hyla annectans is a species of tree frog in the family Hylidae. It is found in Asia south of the Himalayas in northeast India (Assam, Nagaland, Manipur, and Meghalaya), northern Myanmar, and northern montane Vietnam and southwestern and central China (Yunnan, Guizhou, Sichuan, Hunan). There are isolated records in northwestern Thailand and adjacent Myanmar. There is uncertainty whether Hyla gongshanensis from China should be recognized as a distinct species. This widespread species has many common names: Jerdon's tree frog, Assam treefrog, Indian hylid frog, green leave frog, or Southwestern China treefrog.

== Description ==
The following description is taken from George Albert Boulenger's Fauna of British India, including Ceylon and Burma:

The tongue circular, slightly nicked, and free behind. Vomerine teeth in two groups on a level with the hinder edge of the choanae. The head broader than long; snout short, rounded; canthus rostralis distinct; interorbital space as broad as the upper eyelid; tympanum distinct, about half the diameter of the eye. Fingers webbed at the base; the toes two-thirds webbed; disks are well developed. The tibiotarsal articulation reaches the tympanum or the eye. Skin smooth above, granular beneath; a strong tuberculated fold from the eye to the shoulder. Green above; a dark, lateral streak, light-edged above, ending in two or three deep black spots, separated or confluent on the groin, which is bright yellow; sides of thighs with deep black spots on a bright yellow ground; two outer fingers and two outer toes green; beneath whitish, immaculate. Male with an external subgular vocal sac and black nuptial excrescences on the thumb.

From snout to vent 2 inches (5.1 cm).

Modern sources give snout–vent length 28–39 mm (1.1–1.5 in) for males and 32–45 mm (1.3–1.8 in) for females.

== Habitat and conservation ==
Hyla annectans occurs in tropical evergreen and deciduous forest at elevations of 600–2,500 m (2,000–8,200 ft) above sea level, down to 100 m (330 ft) in India. It can also be found in grasslands and agricultural land close to forests. It is largely arboreal. Breeding is explosive and takes place in ponds and terraced paddy fields.

It is common in parts of its range, notably China. It can be threatened by habitat degradation, including water pollution. It is collected for in India. The range of this species includes many protected areas.
