= List of amphibians of Honduras =

This is a list of amphibians found in Honduras. 121 amphibian species have been registered in Honduras, which are grouped in three orders: Caecilians (Gymnophiona), salamanders (Caudata) and frogs and toads (Anura). This list is derived from the database listing of AmphibiaWeb and IUCN Red List.

== Caecilians (Gymnophiona) ==
=== Caeciliidae ===
Order: Gymnophiona – Family: Caeciliidae

- Dermophis mexicanus (VU)
- Gymnopis multiplicata (LC)

== Salamanders (Caudata) ==
=== Plethodontidae ===
Order: Caudata – Family: Plethodontidae

- Cloud forest salamander, Bolitoglossa carri (CR)
- Cataguana salamander, Bolitoglossa cataguana (CR)
- Celaque climbing salamander, Bolitoglossa celaque (EN)
- Conant's salamander, Bolitoglossa conanti (EN)
- Monte Escondido salamander, Bolitoglossa decora (CR)
- Bolitoglossa diaphora, Bolitoglossa diaphora (CR)
- Doflein's salamander, Bolitoglossa dofleini (NT)
- Dunn;s climbing salamander, Bolitoglossa dunni (EN)
- Holy-mountain salamander, Bolitoglossa heiroreias (EN)
- Longest climbing salamander, Bolitoglossa longissima (CR)
- Mexican climbing salamander, Bolitoglossa mexicana (LC)
- Bolitoglossa oresbia (CR)
- Pijol salamander, Bolitoglossa porrasorum (EN)
- Northern banana salamander, Bolitoglossa rufescens (LC)
- Cukra climbing salamander, Bolitoglossa striatula (LC)
- Cerro Pital salamander, Bolitoglossa carri (CR)
- Cortes salamander, Cryptotriton nasalis (EN)
- Dendrotriton sanctibarbarus (VU)
- Nototriton barbouri (EN)
- Nototriton brodiei (CR)
- Cerro de Enmedio moss salamander, Nototriton lignicola (CR)
- Santa Barbara moss salamander, Nototriton limnospectator (EN)
- Nototriton picucha
- Nototriton tomamorum
- Oedipina cyclocauda (LC)
- Oedipina elongata (LC)
- Oedipina gephyra (EN)
- Oedipina kasios
- Oedipina leptopoda
- Oedipina petiola
- Oedipina quadra
- Oedipina stuarti (DD)
- Oedipina tomasi (CR)

== Toads and frogs (Anura) ==
=== Bufonidae ===
Order: Anura – Family: Bufonidae

- Incilius campbelli (NT)
- Incilius coccifer (LC)
- Incilius ibarrai (EN)
- Incilius leucomyos (EN)
- Incilius luetkenii (LC)
- Incilius porteri (DD)
- Gulf Coast toad, Nototriton lignicola (LC)
- Rhaebo haematiticus (LC)
- Rhinella chrysophora (EN)
- Cane toad, Rhinella marina (LC)

=== Centrolenidae ===
Order: Anura – Family: Centrolenidae

- Cochranella granulosa (LC)
- Hyalinobatrachium chirripoi (LC)
- Hyalinobatrachium colymbiphyllum (LC)
- Hyalinobatrachium fleischmanni (LC)
- Teratohyla pulverata (LC)
- Teratohyla spinosa (LC)

=== Craugastoridae ===
Order: Anura – Family: Craugastoridae

- Craugastor anciano (CR)
- Craugastor aurilegulus (EN)
- Craugastor bransfordii (LC)
- Craugastor chac (NT)
- Craugastor chrysozetetes (EX)
- Craugastor coffeus (CR)
- Craugastor cyanochthebius (NT)
- Craugastor emleni (CR)
- Craugastor epochthidius (CR)
- Craugastor fecundus (CR)
- Craugastor fitzingeri (LC)
- Craugastor laevissimus (EN)
- Craugastor laticeps (NT)
- Craugastor lauraster (EN)
- Craugastor megacephalus (LC)
- Craugastor merendonensis (CR)
- Craugastor milesi (CR)
- Craugastor noblei (LC)
- Craugastor olanchano (CR)
- Craugastor omoaensis (CR)
- Craugastor pechorum (EN)
- Craugastor rhodopis (VU)
- Craugastor rostralis (NT)
- Craugastor saltuarius (CR)
- Craugastor stadelmani (CR)

=== Eleutherodactylidae ===
Order: Anura – Family: Eleutherodactylidae

- Greenhouse frog, Eleutherodactylus planirostris (LC)

=== Hylidae ===
Order: Anura – Family: Hylidae

- Agalychnis callidryas (LC)
- Agalychnis moreletii (CR)
- Anotheca spinosa (LC)
- Bromeliohyla bromeliacia (EN)
- Dendropsophus microcephalus (LC)
- Duellmanohyla salvavida (CR)
- Duellmanohyla soralia (CR)
- Ecnomiohyla minera (EN)
- Ecnomiohyla salvaje (CR)
- Exerodonta catracha (EN)
- Hyla melacaena (NT)
- Hypsiboas crepitans (LC)
- Isthmohyla insolita (CR)
- Plectrohyla chrysopleura (CR)
- Plectrohyla dasypus (CR)
- Plectrohyla exquisita (CR)
- Plectrohyla glandulosa (EN)
- Plectrohyla guatemalensis (CR)
- Plectrohyla hartwegi (CR)
- Plectrohyla psiloderma (EN)
- Plectrohyla teuchestes (CR)
- Ptychohyla hypomykter (CR)
- Ptychohyla salvadorensis (EN)
- Ptychohyla spinipollex (EN)
- Scinax staufferi (LC)
- Smilisca baudinii (LC)
- Smilisca sordida (LC)
- Tlalocohyla loquax (LC)
- Tlalocohyla picta (LC)
- Trachycephalus venulosus (LC)
- Triprion petasatus (LC)

=== Leptodactylidae ===
Order: Anura – Family: Leptodactylidae

- Engystomops pustulosus (LC)
- Leptodactylus fragilis (LC)
- Leptodactylus melanonotus (LC)
- Leptodactylus savagei (LC)
- Leptodactylus silvanimbus (CR)

=== Microhylidae ===
Order: Anura – Family: Microhylidae

- Gastrophryne elegans LC
- Northern sheep frog, Hypopachus variolosus LC

=== Ranidae ===
Order: Anura – Family: Ranidae

- Rio Grande leopard frog, Lithobates berlandieri LC
- Highland frog, Lithobates maculatus LC
- Vaillant's frog, Lithobates vaillanti LC
- Warszewitsch's frog, Lithobates warszewitschii LC

=== Rhinophrynidae ===
Order: Anura – Family: Rhinophrynidae

- Mexican burrowing toad, Rhinophrynus dorsalis LC

=== Strabomantidae ===
Order: Anura – Family: Strabomantidae

- Pristimantis ridens LC
