= Anolis johnmeyeri =

Conservation status
- Endangered (IUCN 3.1)

Scientific classification
- Kingdom: Animalia
- Phylum: Chordata
- Class: Reptilia
- Order: Squamata
- Suborder: Iguania
- Family: Anolidae
- Genus: Anolis
- Species: A. johnmeyeri

Binomial name
- Anolis johnmeyeri Wilson & McCranie, 1982

Synonyms
- Norops johnmeyeri (Wilson & McCranie, 1982)

Species of lizard

Anolis johnmeyeri, also known commonly as Meyer's anole, is an endangered species of lizard in the family Dactyloidae. The species is endemic to Honduras.

== Etymology ==
The specific name, johnmeyeri, is in honor of herpetologist John Raymond Meyer.

== Habitat ==
The natural habitat of Anolis johnmeyeri is cloud forest, at elevations of 1,340–2,000 m (4,400–6,560 ft).

== Reproduction ==
Anolis johnmeyeri is oviparous.

== Taxonomy ==
A member of the Anolis auratus species group, Anolis johnmeyeri is closely related to Anolis pijolense and Anolis purpurgularis.
