= Celaque =

Celaque may refer to:

- Celaque National Park, a national park in Honduras
- Cordillera de Celaque, a mountain range and escarpment in Honduras
- Montaña Celaque or Pico de Celaque, the highest peak in the Cordillera de Celaque and the highest elevation in Honduras, also known as Cerro Las Minas
- Bolitoglossa celaque, a species of salamander endemic to Honduras
