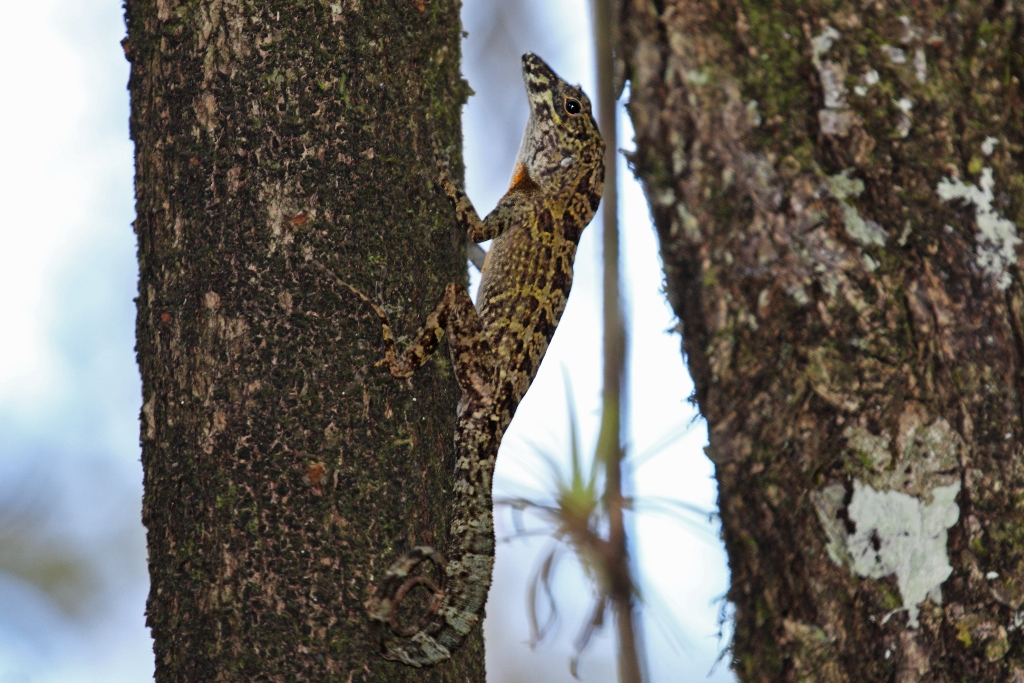
- Anolis rubribarbus

Scientific classification
- Kingdom: Animalia
- Phylum: Chordata
- Class: Reptilia
- Order: Squamata
- Suborder: Iguania
- Family: Anolidae
- Genus: Anolis
- Species: A. rubribarbaris

Binomial name
- Anolis rubribarbaris (Köhler, McCranie, & Wilson, 1999)

= Anolis rubribarbaris =

Species of lizard

Anolis rubribarbaris is a species of lizard in the family Dactyloidae. The species is found in Honduras.
