= Leptodactylus silvanimbus =

Conservation status
- Critically Endangered (IUCN 3.1)

Scientific classification
- Kingdom: Animalia
- Phylum: Chordata
- Class: Amphibia
- Order: Anura
- Family: Leptodactylidae
- Genus: Leptodactylus
- Species: L. silvanimbus

Binomial name
- Leptodactylus silvanimbus McCranie, Wilson & Porras,1980

Species of frog

Leptodactylus silvanimbus is a species of frog in the family Leptodactylidae. It is endemic to Honduras found in the region of El Chaguiton, Ocotepeque. This region is located at 1870 meters, making this species the only one in its genus to live at such high elevation.

== Description ==
The adult male frog measures 41-55 mm in snout-vent length and the adult female frog 44-48 mm. The adult male frog has a black spike on each forefoot. The skin of the dorsum is gray-brown in color. The belly is cream-white in color.

== Etymology ==
Scientists named this frog silvanimbus after its habitat. Silva is Latin for "forest," and nimbus is Latin for "cloud."

== Habitat ==
This frog lives in forests, ponds, flooded places, and pastures. Scientists have seen the frog between 1470 and 2000 meters above sea level.

Scientists have seen the frog in one protected place, La Reserva el Güisayote. They have also seen it just outside Parque Nacional Celaque.

== Reproduction ==
The female frog lays eggs in a nest made out of bubbles in puddles, where the tadpoles swim and grow. The tadpoles can be 42-53 mm long. They are brown-gray in color and their tails are clear with brown dots.

== Threats ==
The IUCN classifies this species as critically endangered. It has shown some tolerance to habitat disturbance, but herbicides and pesticides|pests pose some threat. The construction of a road through its habitat also created problems for the frog. Sometimes scientists find tadpoles with deformed oral disks, which may mean the frogs were exposed to pollution or chytridiomycosis.

Climate change can also hurt this frog. Frogs that live at high altitudes and in specific microhabitats can die or fail to reproduce if there are too many changes in weather and climate.
