= Anolis ocelloscapularis =

Scientific classification
- Kingdom: Animalia
- Phylum: Chordata
- Class: Reptilia
- Order: Squamata
- Suborder: Iguania
- Family: Anolidae
- Genus: Anolis
- Species: A. ocelloscapularis

Binomial name
- Anolis ocelloscapularis (Köhler, McCranie, & Wilson, 2001)

Species of lizard

Anolis ocelloscapularis is a species of lizard in the family Dactyloidae. The species is found in Honduras.
