= Bolitoglossa porrasorum =

Conservation status
- Endangered (IUCN 3.1)

Scientific classification
- Kingdom: Animalia
- Phylum: Chordata
- Class: Amphibia
- Order: Urodela
- Family: Plethodontidae
- Genus: Bolitoglossa
- Species: B. porrasorum

Binomial name
- Bolitoglossa porrasorum McCranie and Wilson, 1995

Species of amphibian

Bolitoglossa porrasorum is a species of salamander in the family Plethodontidae. It is endemic to the mountains of north-central Honduras. Common name Pijol salamander has been proposed for this species in reference to its type locality, Pico Pijol. The specific name porrasorum honors of Jorge Porras Zúñiga and Jorge Porras Orellana, father and son, who provided friendship and assistance to the describers of this species.

== Description ==
Adult males measure 41–58 mm (1.6–2.3 in) and adult females 52–62 mm (2.0–2.4 in) in snout–vent length; females are more robust than the relatively slender males. The snout is truncate. The tail is long but usually shorter than the snout–vent length. The limbs are slender and moderately long. The digits are discrete, bluntly rounded, bearing well developed subdigital pads, and moderately webbed. Coloration is very variable. The dorsal coloration is usually some shade of brown with gold mottling or large darker blotches. The ventral surfaces range from brownish to brownish with pale spots to largely pale.

== Habitat and conservation ==
Bolitoglossa porrasorum occur broadleaf cloud forest at elevations of 980–1,920 m (3,220–6,300 ft) above sea level. They live in arboreal bromeliads, on low vegetation, and on the ground under rotten plant material. Breeding involves direct development (i.e., there is no free-living larval stage).

This species is locally abundant, but it is suspected to be decreasing because of habitat loss caused by agricultural development (including cattle ranching and coffee farming) and logging. It is present in the Pico Pijol National Park.
