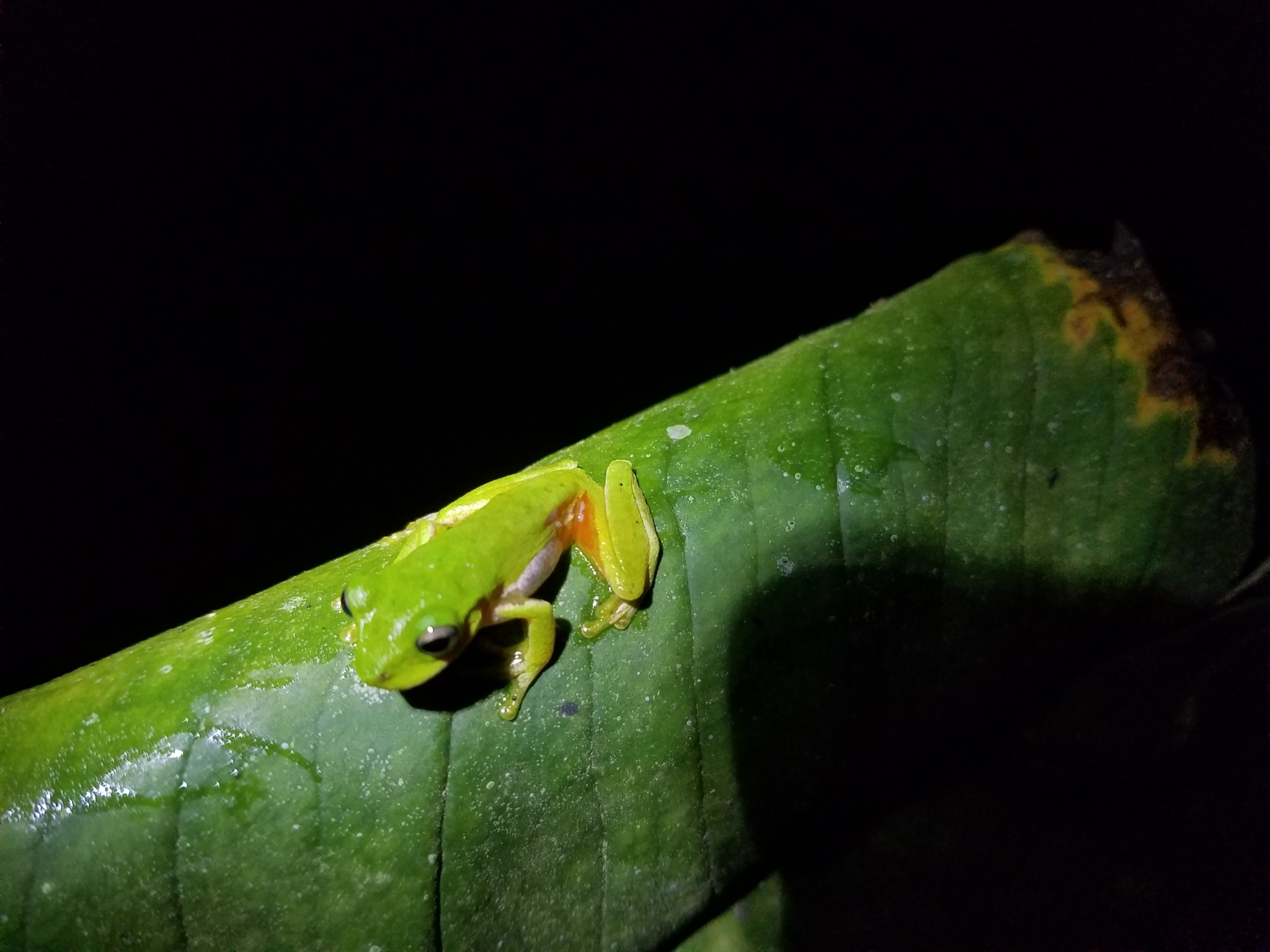

Conservation status
- Near Threatened (IUCN 3.1)

Scientific classification
- Kingdom: Animalia
- Phylum: Chordata
- Class: Amphibia
- Order: Anura
- Family: Hylidae
- Genus: Duellmanohyla
- Species: D. ignicolor

Binomial name
- Duellmanohyla ignicolor (Duellman, 1961)

= Sierra Juarez brook frog =

Species of amphibian

The Sierra Juarez brook frog (Duellmanohyla ignicolor) is a species of frog in the family Hylidae endemic to Mexico. Its natural habitats are subtropical or tropical moist lowland forests, subtropical or tropical moist montane forests, and rivers. It is threatened by habitat loss and possibly by chytridiomycosis, and the IUCN has assessed its conservation status as near threatened.

== Description ==
The Sierra Juarez brook frog is a small species with a snout–vent length of 26 to 30 mm (1.0 to 1.2 in). The male has a rounded snout when seen from above and a squarish snout when seen from the side. The nostrils are protuberant, the eyes have golden irises and the tympani are oval. The limbs are fairly robust and the toes are partially webbed. The colouring is rather variable, with the dorsal surface mostly green and the ventral surface yellowish. The front and back of the thighs as well as parts of the shin and hind toes are some shade of red or orange-red. This frog was first described by the American herpetologist William E. Duellman in 1961 and at that time he had not been able to find and describe a female.

== Ecology ==
This frog lives in cloud forests and requires moist conditions. Breeding occurs mainly in the summer but may take place throughout the year. The male calls from low vegetation near pools and streams. The call consists of from three to thirteen low notes, each lasting for 0.08 seconds and changing frequency in the middle, and sounding like "raa-raa-raa". The tadpoles develop in streams and cling onto rocks and stones with their mouthparts to avoid being swept away.

== Status ==
The Sierra Juarez brook frog has a limited range in the Sierra Juárez Mountains in the state of Oaxaca in southeastern Mexico, where it is present at altitudes between 680 and 1,850 m (2,231 and 6,070 ft). The chief threats it faces are from degradation of its cloud forest habitat by human actions. Some of the tadpoles were found to have keratinised mouthparts, which is likely to indicate infection with the chytridiomycosis fungus, and this may also be a threat for this uncommon species. The International Union for Conservation of Nature has assessed its conservation status as near threatened.
