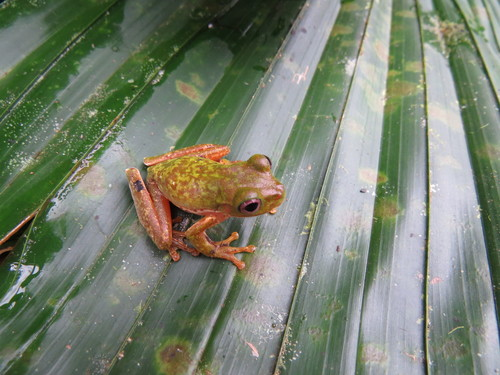
- Duellmanohyla chamulae

Conservation status
- Endangered (IUCN 3.1)

Scientific classification
- Kingdom: Animalia
- Phylum: Chordata
- Class: Amphibia
- Order: Anura
- Family: Hylidae
- Genus: Duellmanohyla
- Species: D. chamulae

Binomial name
- Duellmanohyla chamulae (Duellman, 1961)

Synonyms
- Ptychohyla chamulae Duellman, 1961

= Chamula mountain brook frog =

Species of amphibian

The Chamula mountain brook frog (Duellmanohyla chamulae) is a species of frog in the family Hylidae endemic to Chiapas, Mexico. Its natural habitats are moist montane forests. It is threatened by habitat destruction and has been rated as "endangered" by the IUCN.

== Distribution and habitat ==
The Chamula mountain brook frog is known only from the northern side of the Central Highlands of Chiapas in the state of Chiapas, Mexico. All known localities are between Jitotol and Soluschiapa. It inhabits the moist cloud forests at altitudes of over 1,600 m (5,250 ft).

== Ecology ==
Frogs in the genus Duellmanohyla breed in fast-flowing mountain streams. To adapt to this habitat, the frogs have a moderate degree of webbing on the forefeet and on some digits of the hind-feet. Egg-laying has not been observed in this and other species in the genus, and it is thought that the females may deposit their eggs on the foliage above the water of swift-flowing mountain streams, the tadpoles then falling into the stream when they hatch. The tadpoles have dangling oral discs by which they can attach themselves to the substrate.

== Status ==
The total area of occupancy of the Chamula mountain brook frog is less than 5,000 square kilometres (1,900 sq mi) and it is only known from five locations. The montane cloud forests where it lives are under threat from human activities, and although this is quite a common species where it is found, populations of these frogs are thought to be declining. Another possible threat is the fungal disease of amphibians, chytridiomycosis. For these reasons, the International Union for Conservation of Nature (IUCN) has assessed the conservation status of this frog as being "endangered".
