= Anolis pijolensis =

Conservation status
- Endangered (IUCN 3.1)

Scientific classification
- Kingdom: Animalia
- Phylum: Chordata
- Class: Reptilia
- Order: Squamata
- Suborder: Iguania
- Family: Anolidae
- Genus: Anolis
- Species: A. pijolensis

Binomial name
- Anolis pijolensis (McCranie, Wilson, & Williams, 1993)

Synonyms
- Norops pijolense McCranie, Wilson & Williams, 1993

Species of lizard

Anolis pijolensis is a species of lizard in the family Dactyloidae. The species is found in Honduras.
