= Craugastor cruzi =

Conservation status
- Critically Endangered (IUCN 3.1)

Scientific classification
- Kingdom: Animalia
- Phylum: Chordata
- Class: Amphibia
- Order: Anura
- Clade: Brachycephaloidea
- Family: Craugastoridae
- Genus: Craugastor
- Species: C. cruzi

Binomial name
- Craugastor cruzi (McCranie, Savage & Wilson, 1989)

Species of frog

Craugastor cruzi is a species of frog in the family Craugastoridae. It is endemic to Honduras. Its natural habitats are subtropical or tropical moist montane forests and intermittent rivers.

== Sources ==
- Wilson, L.D.; McCranie, R.; Cruz, G. (2004). "Craugastor cruzi". IUCN Red List of Threatened Species. 2004 e.T56537A11494269. doi:10.2305/IUCN.UK.2004.RLTS.T56537A11494269.en.
