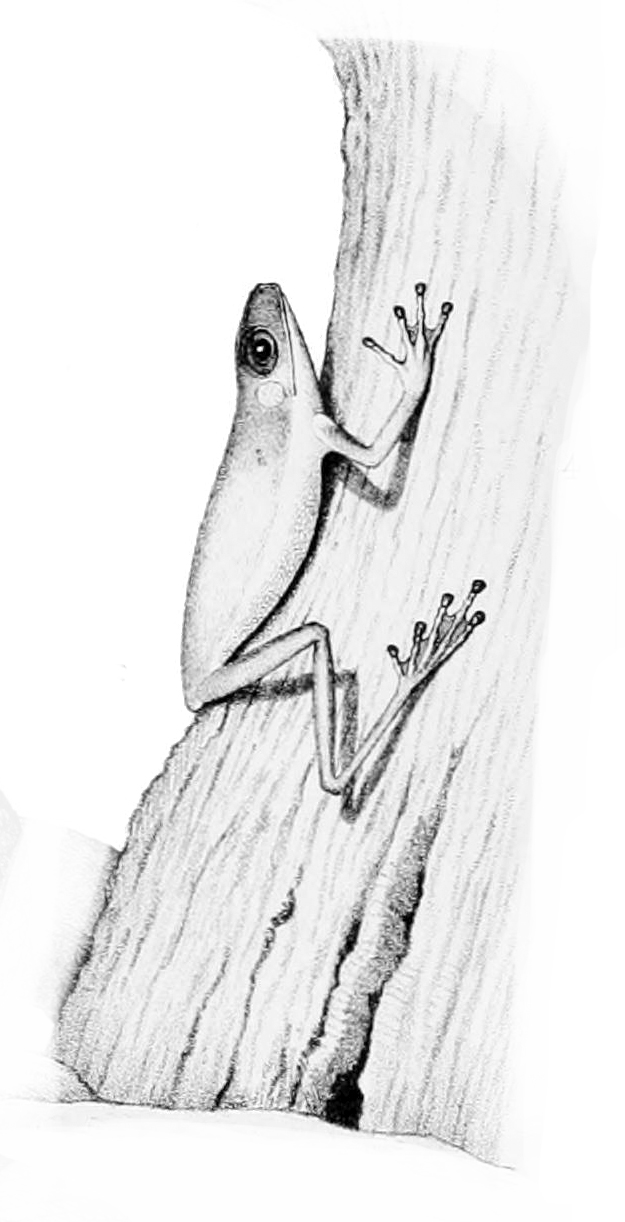
- Duellmanohyla uranochroa

Scientific classification
- Kingdom: Animalia
- Phylum: Chordata
- Class: Amphibia
- Order: Anura
- Family: Hylidae
- Subfamily: Hylinae
- Genus: Duellmanohyla; Campbell & Smith, 1992

Species
- 9 species (see text)

= Duellmanohyla =

Genus of amphibians

Duellmanohyla is a genus of frogs (mountain brook frogs) in the family Hylidae found in Oaxaca, Mexico, as well as Central America. These are small stream-breeding frogs have bright red, bronze or yellow irises. Their dorsa are uniform pale green, olive, red-brown or lichenose, with green or olive spots on a black background. Several species have pale upper labial and lateral stripes. Some fingers or toes have moderate webbing.

== Description ==
Duellmanohyla are small or moderately small frogs. The dorsum is uniformly pale green, olive, reddish brown, or lichenose, and bears green or olive spots on a black background. The iris is bright red, orange, or yellow. The fingers and toes are moderately webbed.

== Ecology ==
Duellmanohyla breed in fast-flowing mountain streams. To adapt to this habitat, the frogs have a moderate degree of webbing on the forefeet and on some digits of the hind-feet. Egg-laying has not been observed in any species in the genus, and it is thought that the females may deposit their eggs on the foliage above the water of swift-flowing mountain streams, the tadpoles then falling into the stream when they hatch. The tadpoles have dangling oral discs by which they can attach themselves to the substrate.

== Species ==
The genus contains eight species:

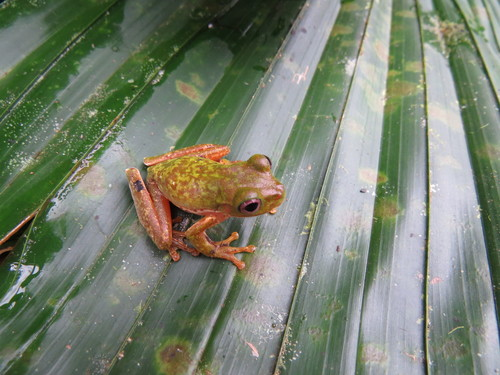
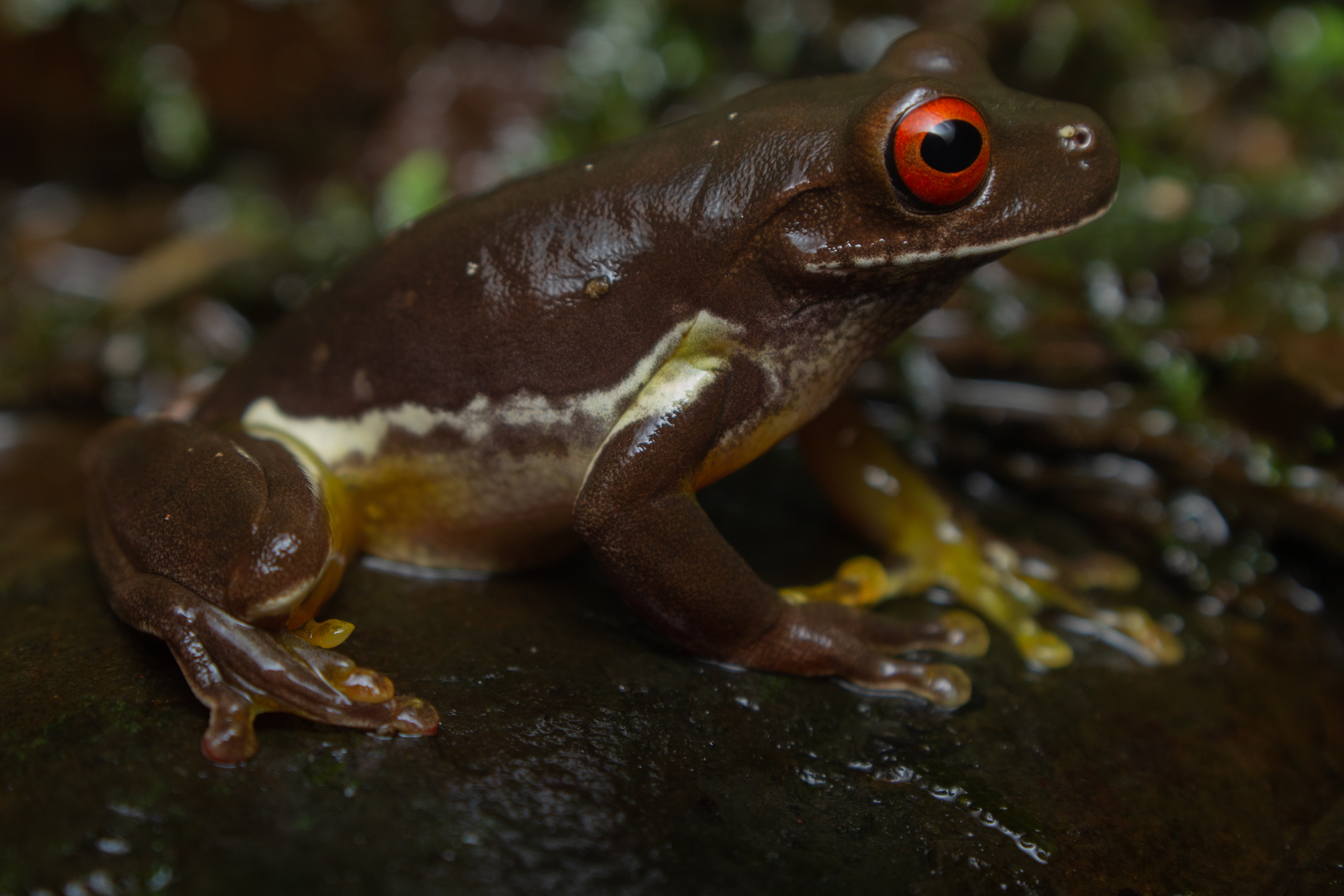
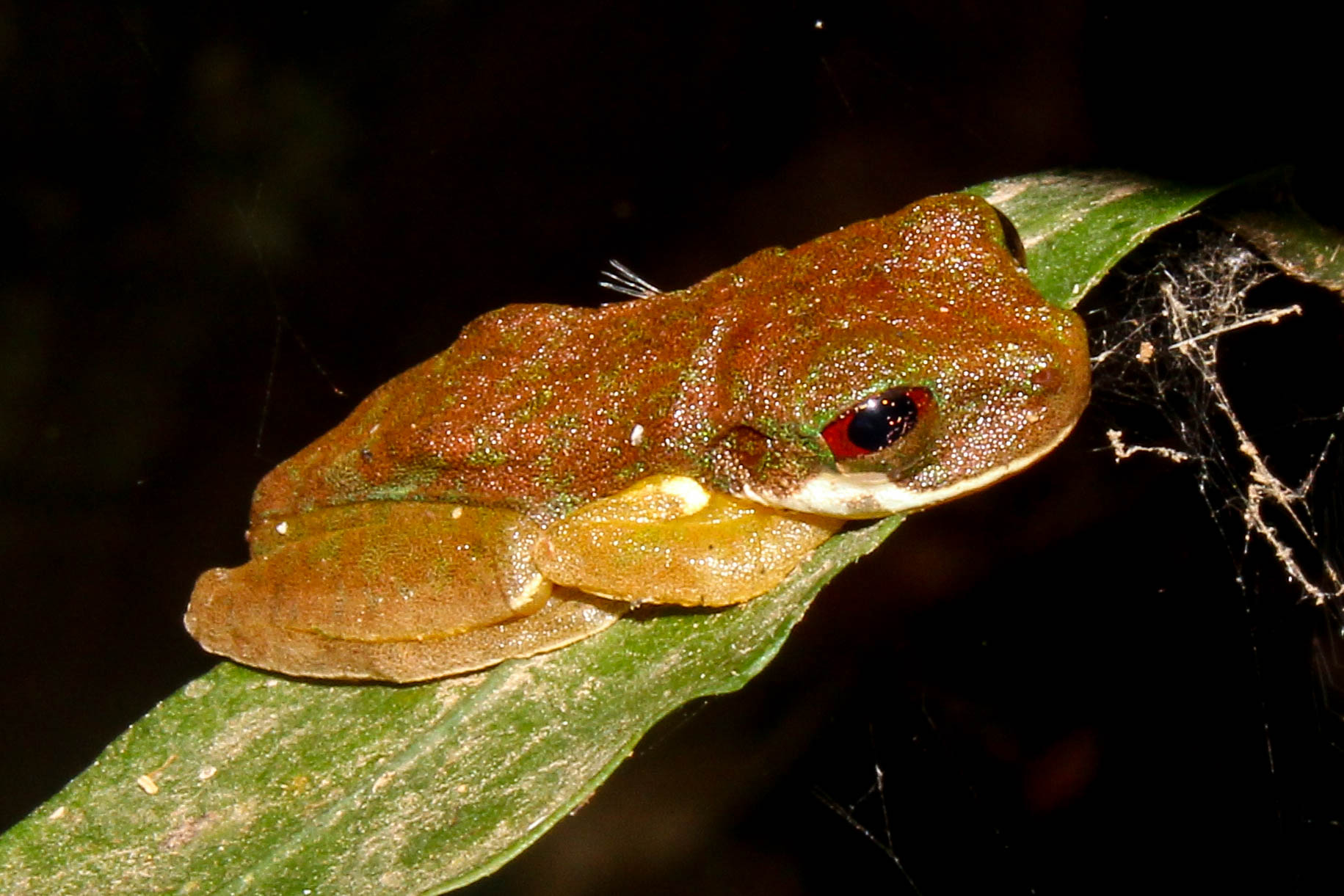
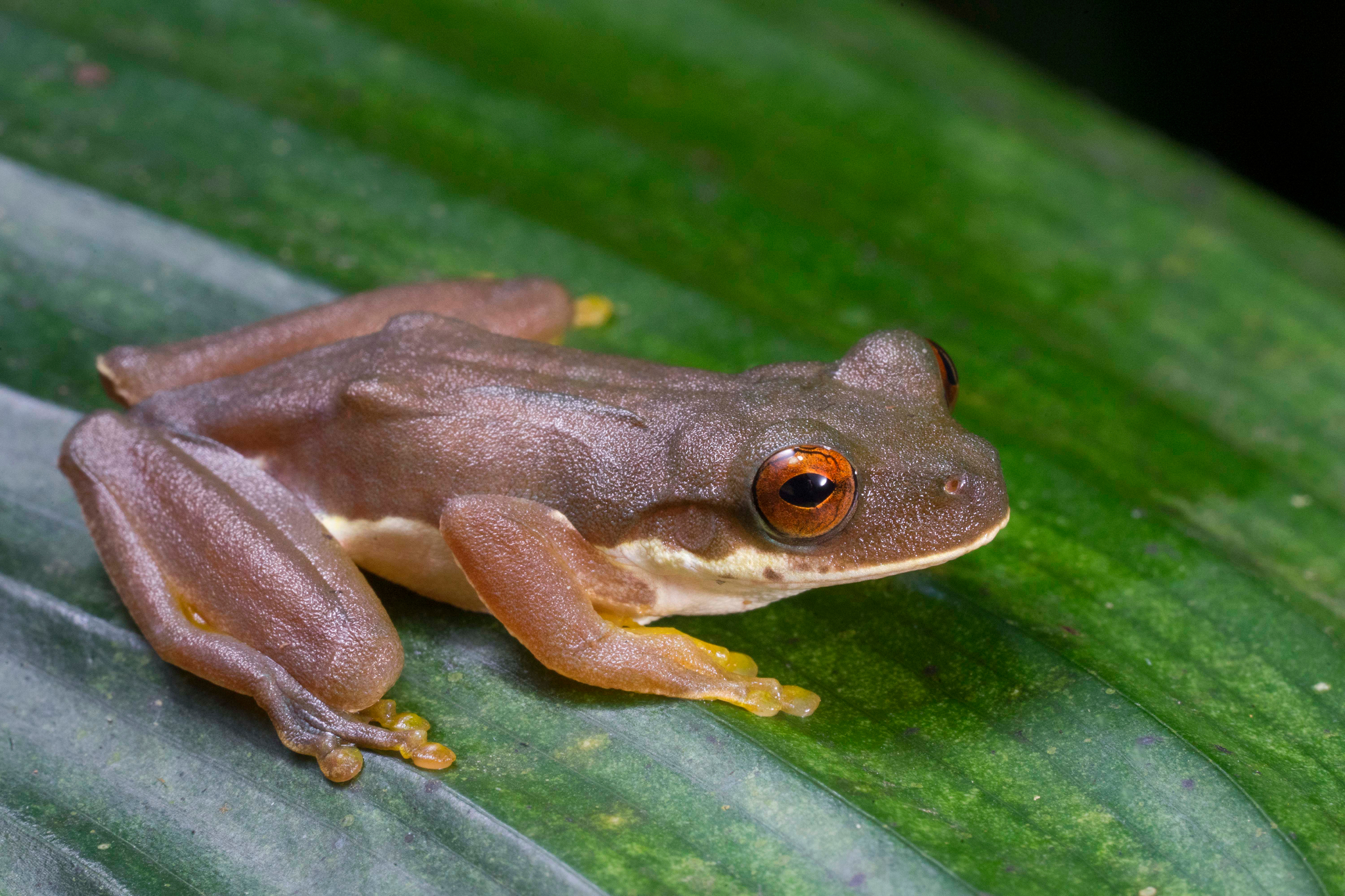
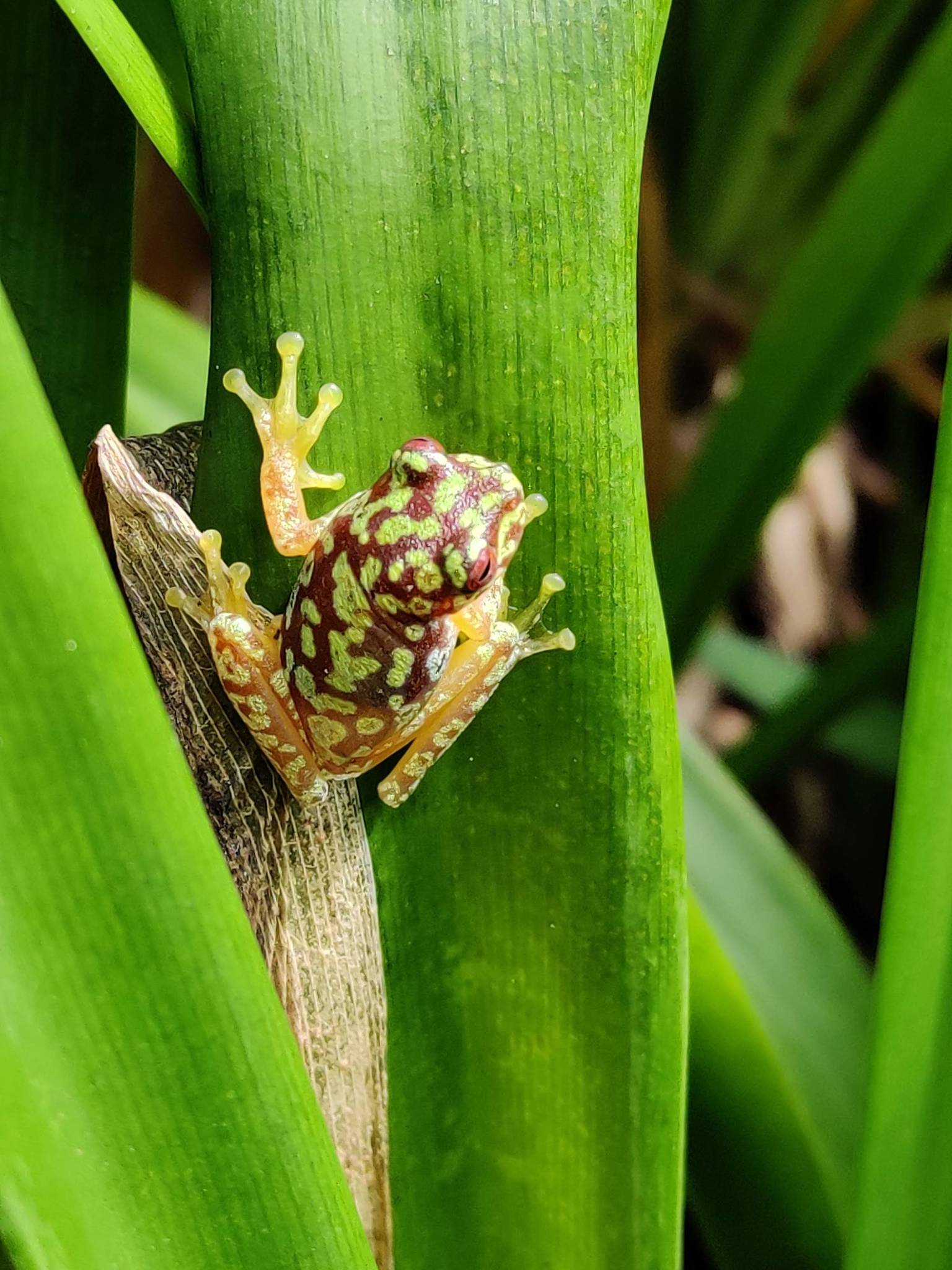
Image	Binomial name and author	Common name
	D. chamulae (Duellman, 1961)	Chamula mountain brook frog
	D. ignicolor (Duellman, 1961)	Sierra Juarez brook frog
	D. legleri (Taylor, 1958)	Legler's stream frog
	D. lythrodes (Savage, 1968)	Savage's brook frog
	D. rufioculis (Taylor, 1952)	Rufous-eyed brook frog
	D. salvavida (McCranie and Wilson, 1986)	Honduran brook frog
	D. schmidtorum (Stuart, 1954)	Schmidt's mountain brook frog
	D. soralia (Wilson and McCranie, 1985)	Copan brook frog
	D. uranochroa (Cope, 1875)	Costa Rica brook frog
