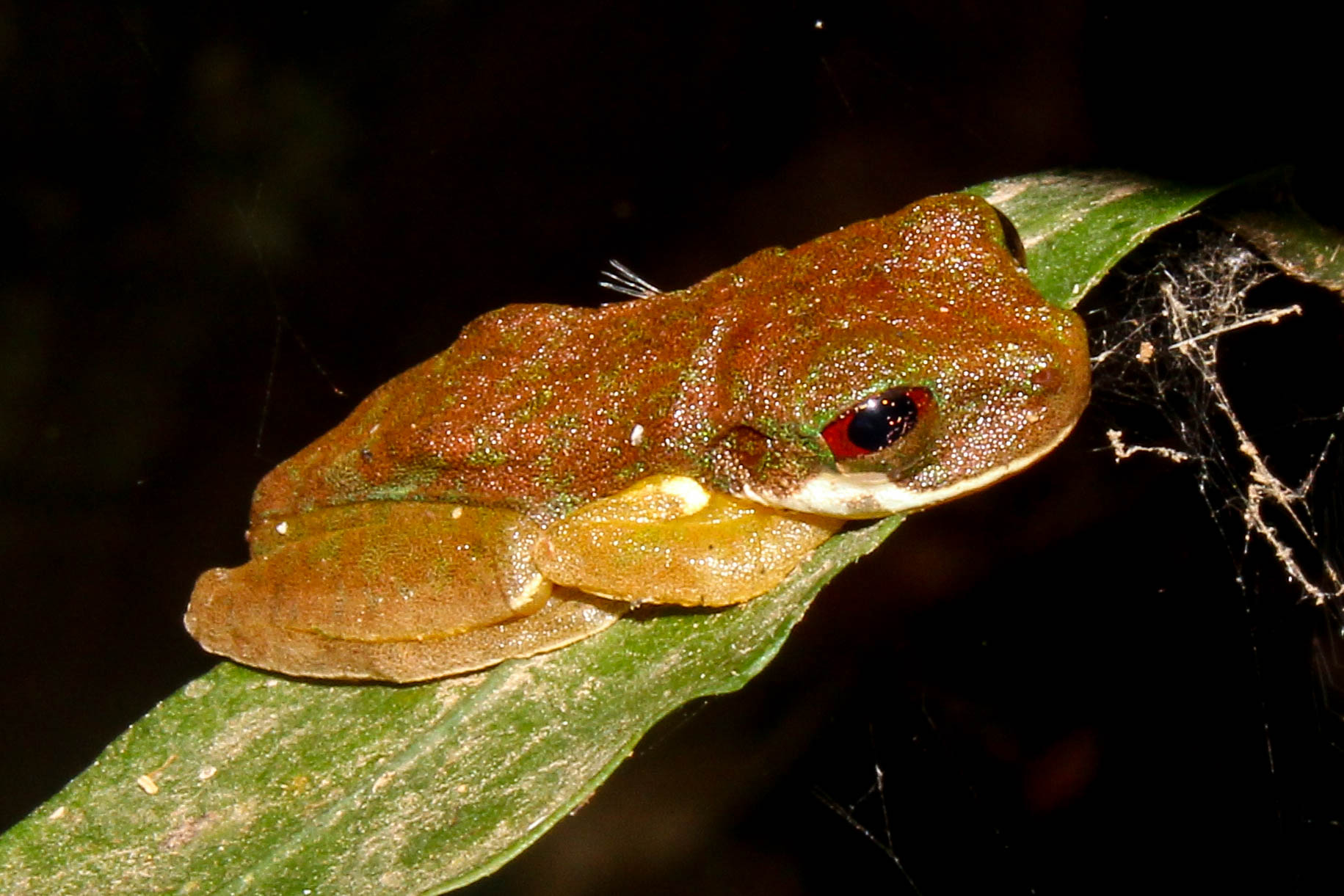

Conservation status
- Least Concern (IUCN 3.1)

Scientific classification
- Kingdom: Animalia
- Phylum: Chordata
- Class: Amphibia
- Order: Anura
- Family: Hylidae
- Genus: Duellmanohyla
- Species: D. rufioculis

Binomial name
- Duellmanohyla rufioculis (Taylor, 1952)

Synonyms
- Hyla rufioculis Taylor, 1952

= Rufous-eyed brook frog =

Species of amphibian

The rufous-eyed brook frog or rufous-eyed stream frog (Duellmanohyla rufioculis), is a species of frog in the family Hylidae. It is endemic to the mountains of Costa Rica. Its natural habitats are premontane wet forests and rainforests. Tadpoles are found in pools with standing water. Habitat loss is posing some threat to the species, although the overall population is stable.

== Description ==
These frogs grow to 4.1 cm (1.6 in) long; males are smaller than females. Color is extremely variable, ranging from brown to mottled mossy green. A distinct white stripe along the upper lip, flanks, and groin expands beneath the eyes to form a prominent white mark. All specimens have a distinctive red iris with horizontal pupils.

== Habitat ==
The rufous-eyed brook frog is endemic to the mountainous regions of Costa Rica, and can be found on the Caribbean and Pacific slopes from 700 to 1,600 m (2,310 to 5,250 ft) asl. This species favors humid forests, and lives in foliage alongside streams. Though threatened by habitat destruction and uncommon within its range, the overall population is believed to be stable.
