= Craugastor chrysozetetes =

Conservation status
- Critically endangered, possibly extinct (IUCN 3.1)

Scientific classification
- Kingdom: Animalia
- Phylum: Chordata
- Class: Amphibia
- Order: Anura
- Clade: Brachycephaloidea
- Family: Craugastoridae
- Genus: Craugastor
- Subgenus: Campbellius
- Species: C. chrysozetetes

Binomial name
- Craugastor chrysozetetes (McCranie, Savage, and Wilson, 1989)

Synonyms
- Eleutherodactylus chrysozetetes McCranie, Savage, and Wilson, 1989

Extinct species of amphibian

Craugastor chrysozetetes is a possibly extinct species of frog in the family Craugastoridae. It is endemic to Honduras where it is only known from near its type locality on the Cerro Búfalo, Cordillera de Nombre de Dios, at the edge of the Pico Bonito National Park. The common name McCranie's robber frog has been coined for this species. However, James McCranie himself has argued that this name "should be rejected in favor of a name associated with the type locality instead of a name tied to one of the three authors who named this species".

Craugastor chrysozetetes was only known from along the stream Quebrada de Oro in Honduras

== Description ==
Adult males measure 34–41 mm (1.3–1.6 in) and adult females 37–46 mm (1.5–1.8 in) in snout–vent length. The snout is nearly rounded in dorsal view and rounded to nearly vertical in lateral view. Tympanum is absent, but there is a well-developed supra-tympanic fold. The fingers bear later keels and broadly expanded discs but have no webbing. The toes bear broadly expanded discs and have webbing, with lateral fleshy fringes in the non-webbed parts. Skin is variously wrinkled and bears many tubercles. The dorsal surfaces are dark olive brown and blotched with pale olive brown (male holotype) or mottled olive-green and dark olive-green (an adult female). The ventral surfaces of the body and throat are pale purple (male) to purplish brown with dull white flecking on the chin and pale blue flecking on the chest (female).

Craugastor chrysozetetes appears to have been able to form hybrids with Craugastor fecundus.

== Habitat and conservation ==
Its natural habitat was premontane wet forest at elevations of 880–1,130 m (2,890–3,710 ft) above sea level. It occurred along the stream Quebrada de Oro. It was always a rare species, and after several visits to the only known site failed to locate the species, the International Union for Conservation of Nature (IUCN) assessed it as extinct in 2004. The cause of extinction is thought have been habitat loss and change (deforestation resulting from agricultural encroachment, human settlement of the region, logging, fires, and landslides). Chytridiomycosis might also have played a role. However, this was changed to Critically Endangered (Possibly Extinct) in 2019 following the possibility that it may survive within Pico Bonito National Park.
