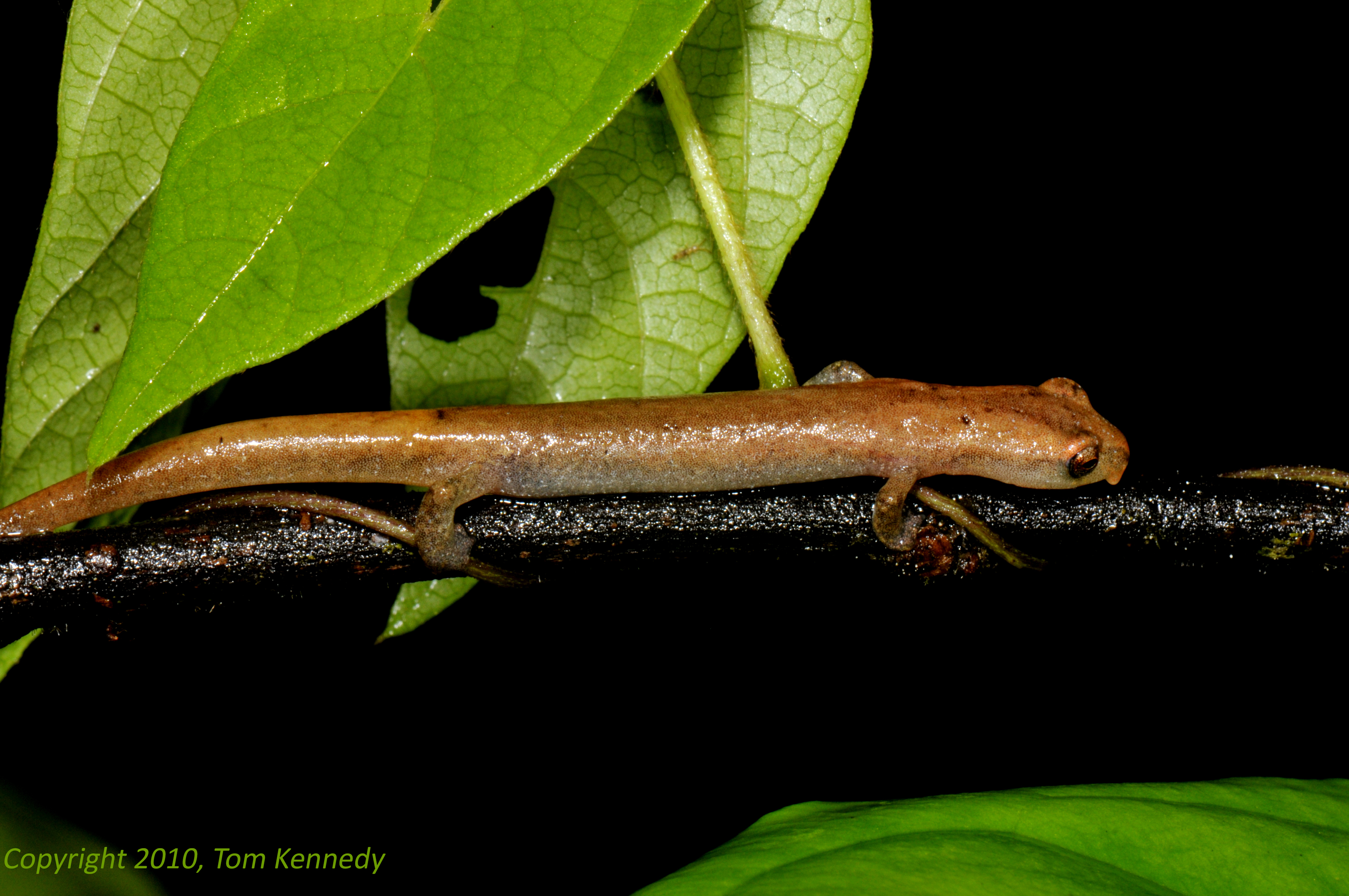

Conservation status
- Endangered (IUCN 3.1)

Scientific classification
- Kingdom: Animalia
- Phylum: Chordata
- Class: Amphibia
- Order: Urodela
- Family: Plethodontidae
- Genus: Bolitoglossa
- Species: B. diaphora

Binomial name
- Bolitoglossa diaphora McCranie & Wilson, 1995

= El Cusuco salamander =

Species of salamander

The El Cusuco salamander (Bolitoglossa diaphora) is a species of salamander in the family Plethodontidae. It is endemic to Honduras, and more specifically only to El Cusuco National Park. Its natural habitat is subtropical or tropical moist montane forests. It is threatened by habitat loss.
