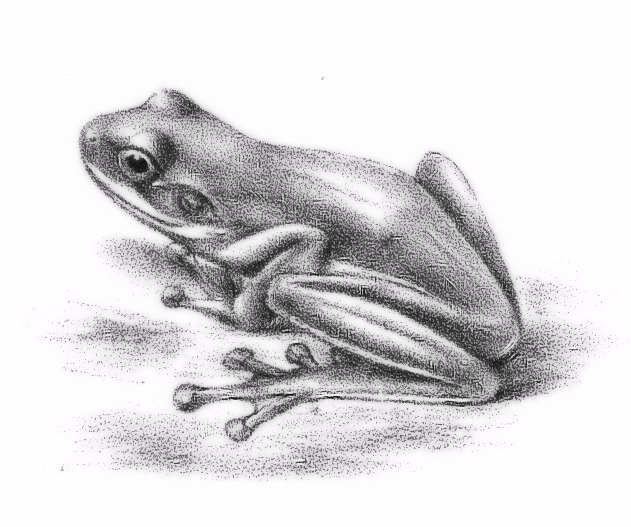

Conservation status
- Vulnerable (IUCN 3.1)

Scientific classification
- Kingdom: Animalia
- Phylum: Chordata
- Class: Amphibia
- Order: Anura
- Family: Hylidae
- Genus: Duellmanohyla
- Species: D. uranochroa

Binomial name
- Duellmanohyla uranochroa (Cope, 1875)

= Costa Rica brook frog =

Species of amphibian

The Costa Rica brook frog or red-eyed stream frog (Duellmanohyla uranochroa) is a species of frog in the family Hylidae found in Costa Rica and Panama. Its natural habitats are tropical moist lowland forests, subtropical or tropical moist montane forests, and rivers between 70 and 1740 meters above sea level.

== Appearance ==
The skin of dorsum is leaf-green in color. The ventrum and neck are bright yellow. The ventral parts of the legs are dull yellow. A yellow-white stripe reaches from the lip down each side of the body to the groin. The iris is bright red with horizontal pupils. The female frog is larger than the male frog, with larger tympanums.

== Behavior ==
This frog is nocturnal. It has been seen at night near mountain streams. During the day, they have been seen hiding in bromeliad plants. The frogs breed in May and June. The male frog's call sounds like "boop boop boop boop", but individual frogs and frogs in different geographic locations can sound slightly different. The female frog lays eggs in pools of water with silty bottoms.

== Threats ==
As of 2013, This species is classified as vulnerable by the IUCN. Declines and local extinctions have been reported for populations (referred to as Hyla uranochroa) within the Monteverde region of Costa Rica's Cordillera de Tilaran, synchronous with the decline of 24 (from a total of 53) other amphibian species during 1990.
