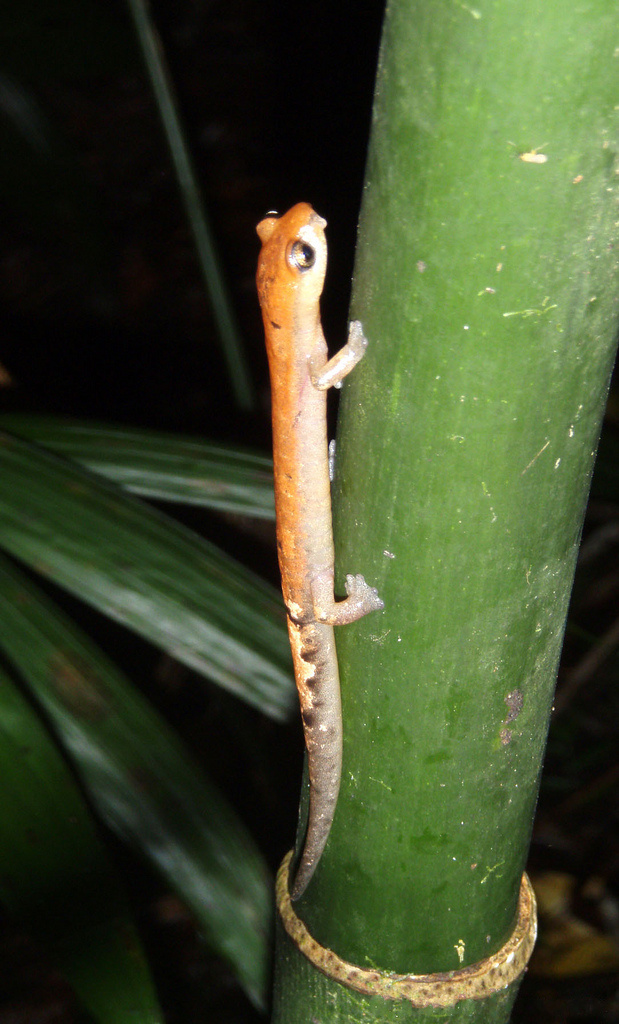

Conservation status
- Vulnerable (IUCN 3.1)

Scientific classification
- Kingdom: Animalia
- Phylum: Chordata
- Class: Amphibia
- Order: Urodela
- Family: Plethodontidae
- Genus: Bolitoglossa
- Species: B. conanti

Binomial name
- Bolitoglossa conanti McCranie & Wilson, 1993

= Conant's salamander =

Species of amphibian

Conant's salamander (Bolitoglossa conanti) is a species of salamander in the family Plethodontidae. It is endemic to Honduras. Its natural habitat is subtropical or tropical moist montane forests. It is threatened by habitat loss.
