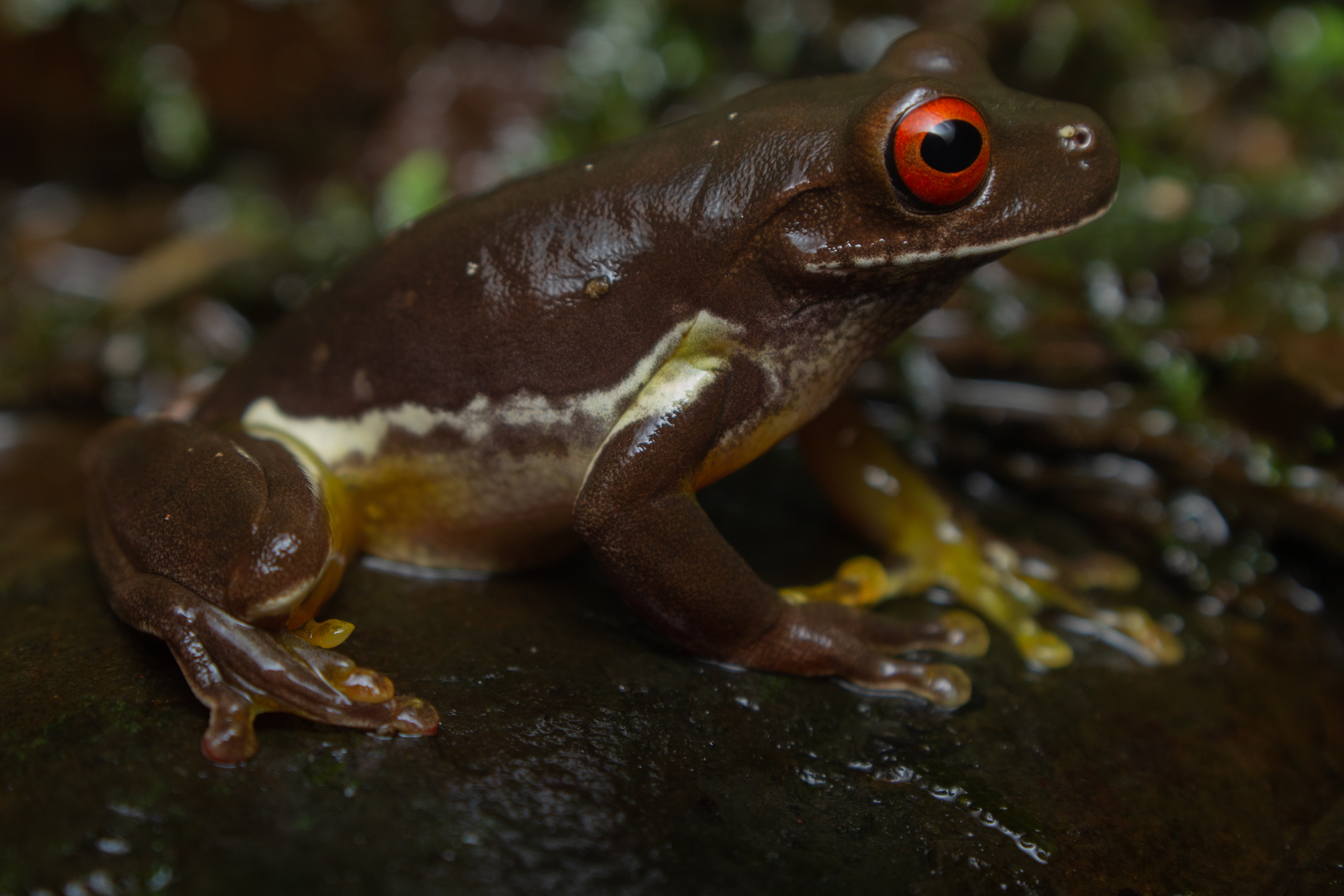

Conservation status
- Endangered (IUCN 3.1)

Scientific classification
- Kingdom: Animalia
- Phylum: Chordata
- Class: Amphibia
- Order: Anura
- Family: Hylidae
- Genus: Duellmanohyla
- Species: D. legleri

Binomial name
- Duellmanohyla legleri (Taylor, 1958)

Synonyms
- Hyla legleri Taylor, 1958; Ptychohyla legleri Campbell and Smith, 1992

= Legler's stream frog =

Species of amphibian

Legler's stream frog (Duellmanohyla legleri) is a species of frogs in the family Hylidae found in Costa Rica and Panama. Its natural habitats are subtropical or tropical moist lowland forests, subtropical or tropical moist montane forests, and rivers. It is threatened by habitat loss.

It is named after John M. Legler, a herpetologist at the University of Kansas.
