= Savage's brook frog =

Conservation status
- Endangered (IUCN 3.1)

Scientific classification
- Kingdom: Animalia
- Phylum: Chordata
- Class: Amphibia
- Order: Anura
- Family: Hylidae
- Genus: Duellmanohyla
- Species: D. lythrodes

Binomial name
- Duellmanohyla lythrodes (Savage, 1968)

Species of amphibian

Savage's brook frog (Duellmanohyla lythrodes) is a species of frog in the family Hylidae found in Costa Rica and Panama. Its natural habitats are subtropical or tropical moist lowland forests and rivers. It is threatened by habitat loss.
