= Incilius leucomyos =

Conservation status
- Near Threatened (IUCN 3.1)

Scientific classification
- Kingdom: Animalia
- Phylum: Chordata
- Class: Amphibia
- Order: Anura
- Family: Bufonidae
- Genus: Incilius
- Species: I. leucomyos

Binomial name
- Incilius leucomyos (McCranie and Wilson, 2000)

Synonyms
- Bufo leucomyos McCranie and Wilson, 2000; Cranopsis leucomyos (McCranie and Wilson, 2000); Ollotis leucomyos (McCranie and Wilson, 2000)

Species of amphibian

Incilius leucomyos is a species of toad in the family Bufonidae. It was described in 2000 and is endemic to the Atlantic versant of the north-central Honduras.

== Description ==
Adult males measure 51–68 mm (2.0–2.7 in) and females 55–96 mm (2.2–3.8 in) in snout–vent length. The body is robust and the head is slightly wider than it is long. The snout is nearly rounded but has a protruding tip in dorsal view. The tympanum is distinct but comparatively small. The canthal, supra-orbital, post-orbital, supra-tympanic, and parietal crests are all well-developed. The parotoid glands are sub-triangular. The limbs are relatively long. The fingers are long and slender and without enlarged tips and webbing. The toes are also long and slender but have some webbing. Skin is dorsally rugose and ventrally granular to strongly granular. The dorsal coloration is mostly yellow ocher but with buff mid-dorsal area. There is a rust-brown inter-ocular bar, rust-colored crests, and pale rust-colored post-ocular blotches.

== Habitat and conservation ==
Its natural habitats are lowland moist forests as well as premontane and lower montane wet forests; its altitudinal range is from near sea level to 1,600 m (5,200 ft) above sea level. The tadpoles develop in streams. It is threatened by habitat loss caused by landslides (impacting streams) as well as from farming, logging, and human settlements. It occurs in some protected areas, including the La Muralla and Pico Bonito National Parks.
