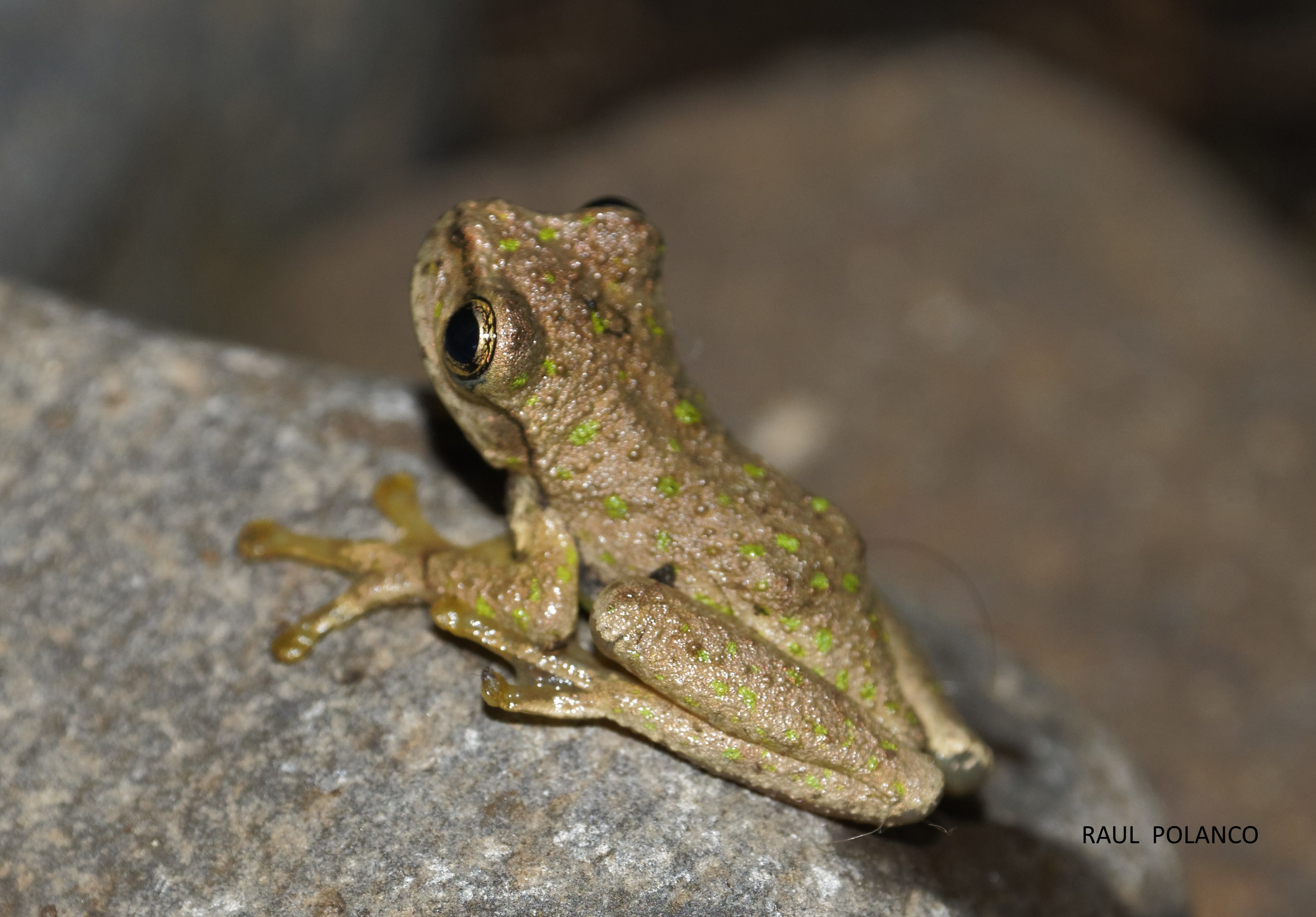

Conservation status
- Vulnerable (IUCN 3.1)

Scientific classification
- Kingdom: Animalia
- Phylum: Chordata
- Class: Amphibia
- Order: Anura
- Family: Hylidae
- Genus: Ptychohyla
- Species: P. hypomykter

Binomial name
- Ptychohyla hypomykter McCranie & Wilson, 1993

= Copan stream frog =

Species of amphibian

The Copan stream frog (Ptychohyla hypomykter) is a species of frogs in the family Hylidae found in Guatemala, Honduras, Nicaragua, and possibly El Salvador. Its natural habitats are subtropical or tropical moist lowland forests, subtropical or tropical moist montane forests, rivers, pastureland, and heavily degraded former forests. It is threatened by habitat loss.
