= Craugastor saltuarius =

Conservation status
- Critically endangered, possibly extinct (IUCN 3.1)

Scientific classification
- Kingdom: Animalia
- Phylum: Chordata
- Class: Amphibia
- Order: Anura
- Clade: Brachycephaloidea
- Family: Craugastoridae
- Genus: Craugastor
- Species: C. saltuarius

Binomial name
- Craugastor saltuarius (McCranie & Wilson, 1997)

Species of frog

Craugastor saltuarius is a species of frog in the family Craugastoridae. It is endemic to Honduras. Its natural habitat is subtropical or tropical moist montane forests. It is threatened by habitat loss.
