= Plectrohyla chrysopleura =

Conservation status
- Critically Endangered (IUCN 3.1)

Scientific classification
- Kingdom: Animalia
- Phylum: Chordata
- Class: Amphibia
- Order: Anura
- Family: Hylidae
- Genus: Plectrohyla
- Species: P. chrysopleura

Binomial name
- Plectrohyla chrysopleura Wilson, McCranie & Cruz, 1994

Species of frog

Plectrohyla chrysopleura is a species of frog in the family Hylidae. It is endemic to Honduras. Its natural habitats are subtropical or tropical moist lowland forests, subtropical or tropical moist montane forests, and rivers. It is threatened by habitat loss.
