= Craugastor epochthidius =

Conservation status
- Critically Endangered (IUCN 3.1)

Scientific classification
- Kingdom: Animalia
- Phylum: Chordata
- Class: Amphibia
- Order: Anura
- Clade: Brachycephaloidea
- Family: Craugastoridae
- Genus: Craugastor
- Species: C. epochthidius

Binomial name
- Craugastor epochthidius (McCranie & Wilson, 1997)

Species of frog

Craugastor epochthidius is a species of frog in the family Craugastoridae. It is endemic to Honduras. Its natural habitats are subtropical or tropical moist lowland forests, subtropical or tropical moist montane forests, and rivers. It is threatened by habitat loss.
