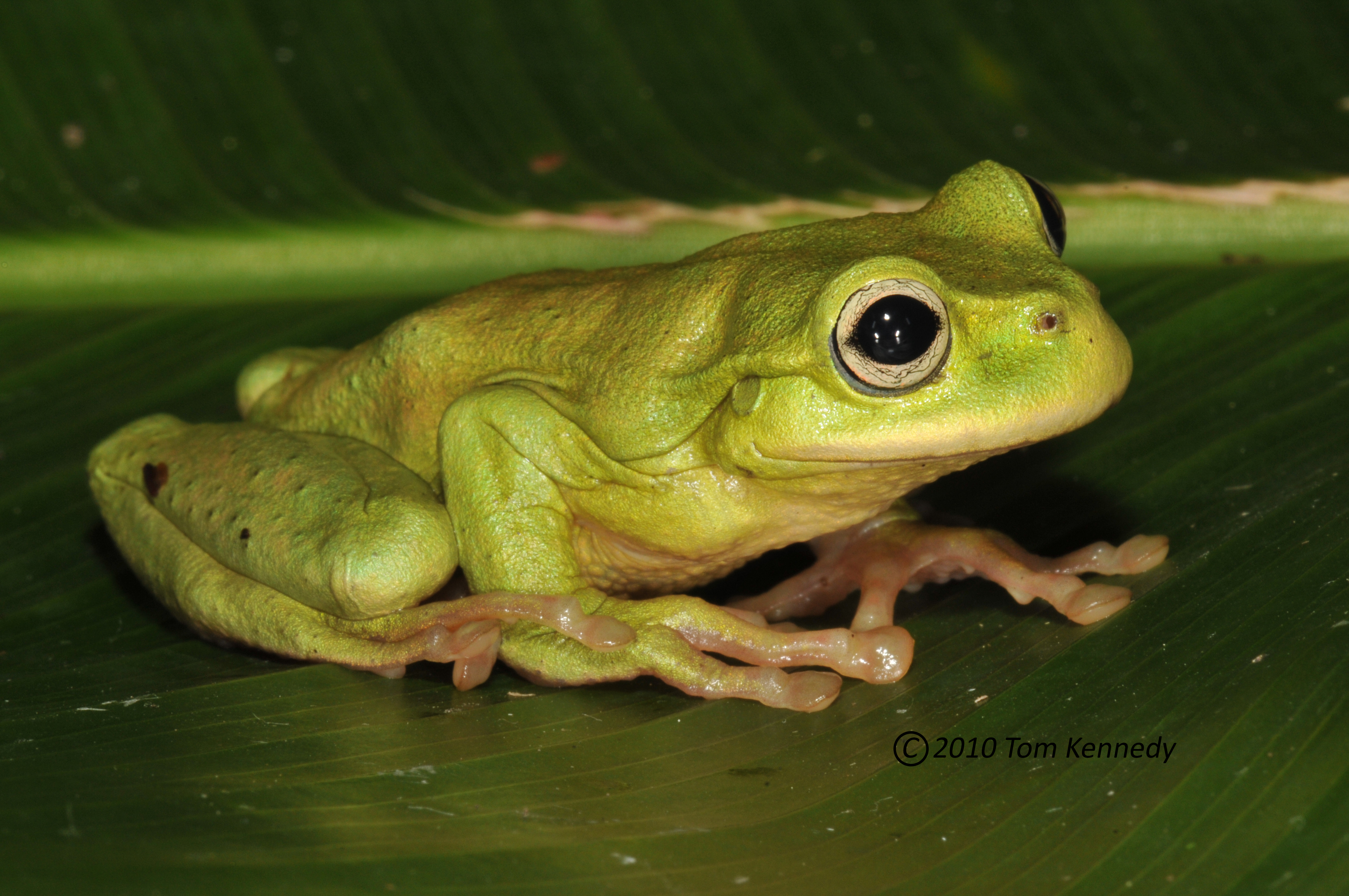

Conservation status
- Critically Endangered (IUCN 3.1)

Scientific classification
- Kingdom: Animalia
- Phylum: Chordata
- Class: Amphibia
- Order: Anura
- Family: Hylidae
- Genus: Plectrohyla
- Species: P. exquisita

Binomial name
- Plectrohyla exquisita McCranie & Wilson, 1998

= Plectrohyla exquisita =

Species of amphibian

Plectrohyla exquisita is a species of frogs in the family Hylidae. Before its description in 1998, it was confused with Plectrohyla teuchestes. It is endemic to the Sierra de Omoa in the Cortés Department of northwestern Honduras. The species range is within the Cusuco National Park.

Natural habitats of Plectrohyla exquisita are lower montane wet forests at elevations of 1,490–1,680 m (4,890–5,510 ft) asl. They are found on low vegetation along streams and breed in streams. It is moderately common but assumed to be in decline because of chytridiomycosis.
