= Anolis purpurgularis =

Scientific classification
- Kingdom: Animalia
- Phylum: Chordata
- Class: Reptilia
- Order: Squamata
- Suborder: Iguania
- Family: Dactyloidae
- Genus: Anolis
- Species: A. purpurgularis

Binomial name
- Anolis purpurgularis (McCranie, Cruz, & Holm, 1993)

Species of lizard

Anolis purpurgularis is a species of lizard in the family Dactyloidae. The species is found in Honduras.
