= Craugastor anciano =

Conservation status
- Extinct (IUCN 3.1)

Scientific classification
- Kingdom: Animalia
- Phylum: Chordata
- Class: Amphibia
- Order: Anura
- Clade: Brachycephaloidea
- Family: Craugastoridae
- Genus: Craugastor
- Species: †C. anciano

Binomial name
- †Craugastor anciano (Savage, McCranie, and Wilson, 1988)

Synonyms
- Eleutherodactylus anciano Savage, McCranie, and Wilson, 1988

Extinct species of amphibian

Craugastor anciano was a species of frog in the family Craugastoridae. It was endemic to the Cordillera de Celaque in Honduras. Its natural habitats were moist premontane and lower montane forests. It lived on the ground along streams.

Craugastor anciano was an extremely rare species that is now considered extinct. Chytridiomycosis is a possible reason, although habitat loss may have also contributed.
