= Ecnomiohyla salvaje =

Conservation status
- Endangered (IUCN 3.1)

Scientific classification
- Kingdom: Animalia
- Phylum: Chordata
- Class: Amphibia
- Order: Anura
- Family: Hylidae
- Genus: Ecnomiohyla
- Species: E. salvaje

Binomial name
- Ecnomiohyla salvaje (Wilson, McCranie & Williams, 1985)

Species of frog

Ecnomiohyla salvaje (also named Copan Treefrog or Savage Tree Frog) is a species of frog in the family Hylidae. It is found in Guatemala and Honduras. Its natural habitats are subtropical or tropical moist montane forests and heavily degraded former forest. It is threatened by habitat loss.
