= Rhinella chrysophora =

Conservation status
- Critically Endangered (IUCN 3.1)

Scientific classification
- Kingdom: Animalia
- Phylum: Chordata
- Class: Amphibia
- Order: Anura
- Family: Bufonidae
- Genus: Rhinella
- Species: R. chrysophora

Binomial name
- Rhinella chrysophora (McCranie, Wilson, and Williams, 1989)

Synonyms
- Atelophryniscus chrysophorus McCranie, Wilson, and Williams, 1989; Bufo chrysophorus (McCranie, Wilson, and Williams, 1989); Chaunus chrysophorus (McCranie, Wilson, and Williams, 1989)

Species of amphibian

Rhinella chrysophora, sometimes known as the Rio Viejo toad, is a species of toad in the family Bufonidae. It is endemic to the Cordillera Nombre de Dios on the Atlantic versant in north-central Honduras. Additionally, taxonomic authorities have affirmed the placement of Rhinella chrysophora within the genus Rhinella, rejecting earlier use of the name Atelophryniscus chrysophorus and confirming that the reclassification complies with the International Code of Zoological Nomenclature (ICZN).

== Description ==
Based on the type series consisting of two adult males (including the holotype) and an adult female, males measure 33.6–37.4 mm (1.32–1.47 in) and females 36.2 mm (1.43 in) in snout–vent length. The parotoid gland is subtriangular. The fingers have no webbing whereas the toes are webbed. The dorsum is pale to dark lime green with olive brown blotching and pale lime green lateral or dorsolater stripes. There are rusty brick red pustules. The venter is pale blue-green, with dark chocolate brown mottling.

The tadpoles are "gastromyzophorous", that is, torrent-adapted tadpoles that bear an abdominal sucker. They resemble those of another bufonid genus, Atelopus, although the adults are different. The suctorial disc is large, extending about three-fourths length of body. The coloration is black with gold markings. The largest tadpoles are about 26 mm (1.0 in) in total length. A newly metamorphosed juvenile with a tail stub measured 9.2 mm (0.36 in) in snout–vent length.

Interestingly, all the phylogenetic analyses that are based on all 83 morphological traits indicates that Rhinella chrysophora is a species which is closely related to the South American species called Rhinella veraguensis, which also supports its placement in the genus Rhinella.. Adding to that, Larval studies have shown that Rhinella chrysophora tadpoles possess an unusually flattened, open chondrocranium and a reduced branchial skeleton with only three pairs of ceratobranchial bones instead of the typical four, a rare feature among frogs that reflects adaptation to life in fast-flowing streams.

== Habitat and conservation ==
Its natural habitats are premontane and lower montane wet forests at elevations of 750–1,760 m (2,460–5,770 ft) above sea level. The tadpoles develop in mountain streams, clinging to rocks and boulders. It is threatened by habitat loss caused by landslides and slash-and-burn agriculture. The range of the species include the Pico Bonito National Park.

Also, this species was last seen in the year 1996 in the field, and after that, no tissue sample was collected for genetic testing, because of which its evolutionary relationships were still unresolved.
