= Celaque National Park =

Honduran national park

- IUCN category II (national park)
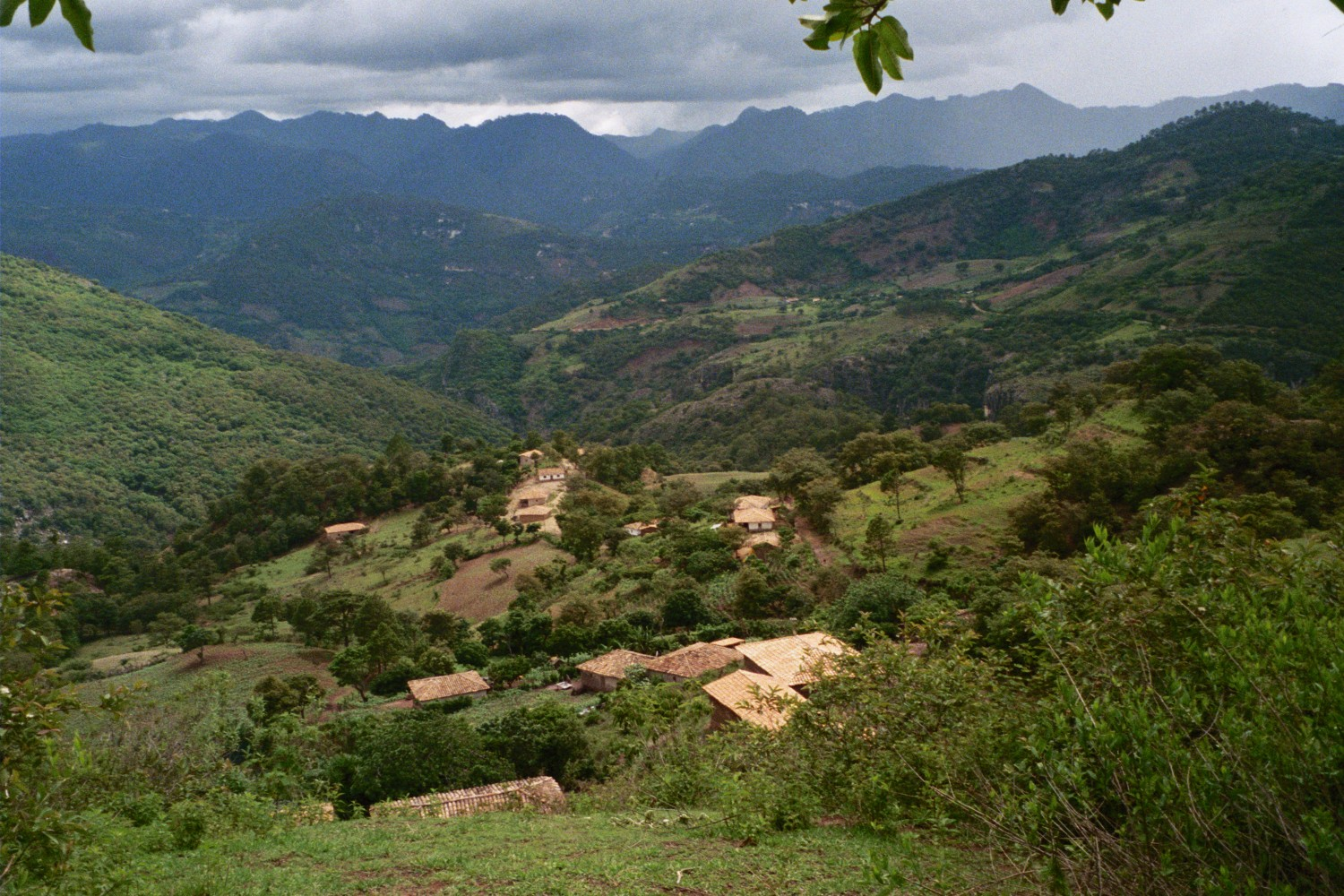
- San Isidro, a small town located in Celaque's mounts.

- Location within Honduras
- Location: Lempira Department, Honduras Ocotepeque.
- Coordinates: 14°32′08″N 88°42′26″W
- Area: 266.4 km^{2} (102.9 sq mi)
- Established: 5 August 1987

Celaque National Park (formally in Spanish, Parque Nacional Montaña de Celaque) is a national park in Lempira Ocotepeque and Copán, western Honduras. It was established on 5 August 1987 and covers an area of 266.31 square kilometres. It includes Honduras’ tallest peak, called Cerro Las Minas or Pico Celaque, which reaches approximately 2,870 metres (9,416 ft) above mean sea level. It has an elevation ranging from 975 to 2,870 metres (3,199 to 9,416 ft). Celaque's terrain is very rugged, two-thirds of the area has a slope greater than 60 degrees. The park is classified as a cloud forest with a mean precipitation of 1,600 mm at lower altitudes and a mean of 2,400 mm at higher altitudes. The word celaque is reputed to mean caja de aguas ("box of water(s)") in the local, but now extinct, indigenous Lenca language. Celaque's nine rivers supplies water to 120 villages nearby including the district capital of Gracias. Celaque is high in biodiversity and is home to pumas, ocelots and Bolitoglossa celaque, an endangered plethodontid salamander found only in the mountains of Celaque.

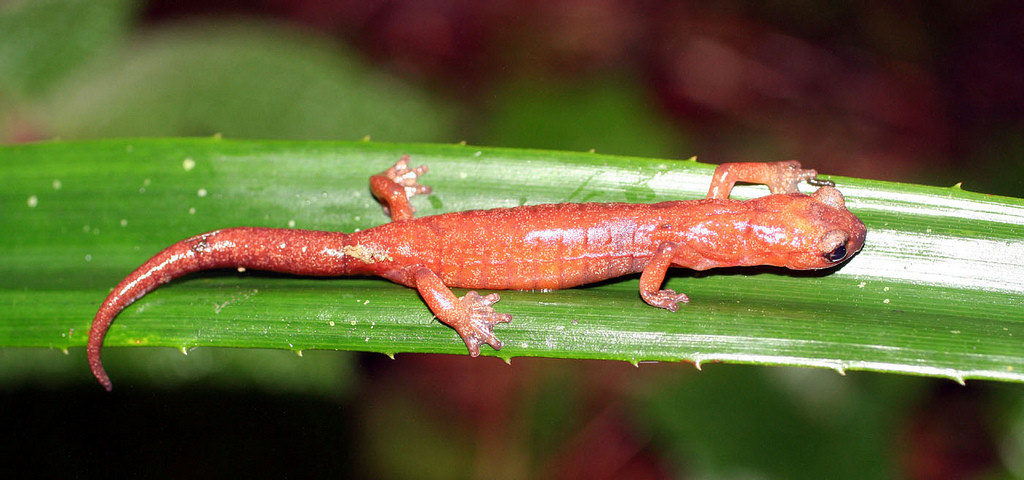
Bolitoglossa celaque, an endangered lungless salamander, endemic to Honduras.

== Establishment ==
Between 1970 and 1980 The Honduran Forestry Development Corporation (HFDC) lead intense logging throughout Celaque's peaks. The result was a loss in biodiversity and vital resources to the communities. However, logging was not the only cause of loss of forests. The communities inside the park's perimeters have created open forest patches due to small-scale farming. The people of La Campa, a town close by, grew nervous and formed a grassroots organization to try to stop the logging. Their goal was met in 1987 when the National Congress of Honduras made Celaque a national park. By forming the park, some 266 square kilometres (65,730 acres) were nationally protected from logging, agriculture, outside incursion and market-related forestry exploitation.

== Early progress ==
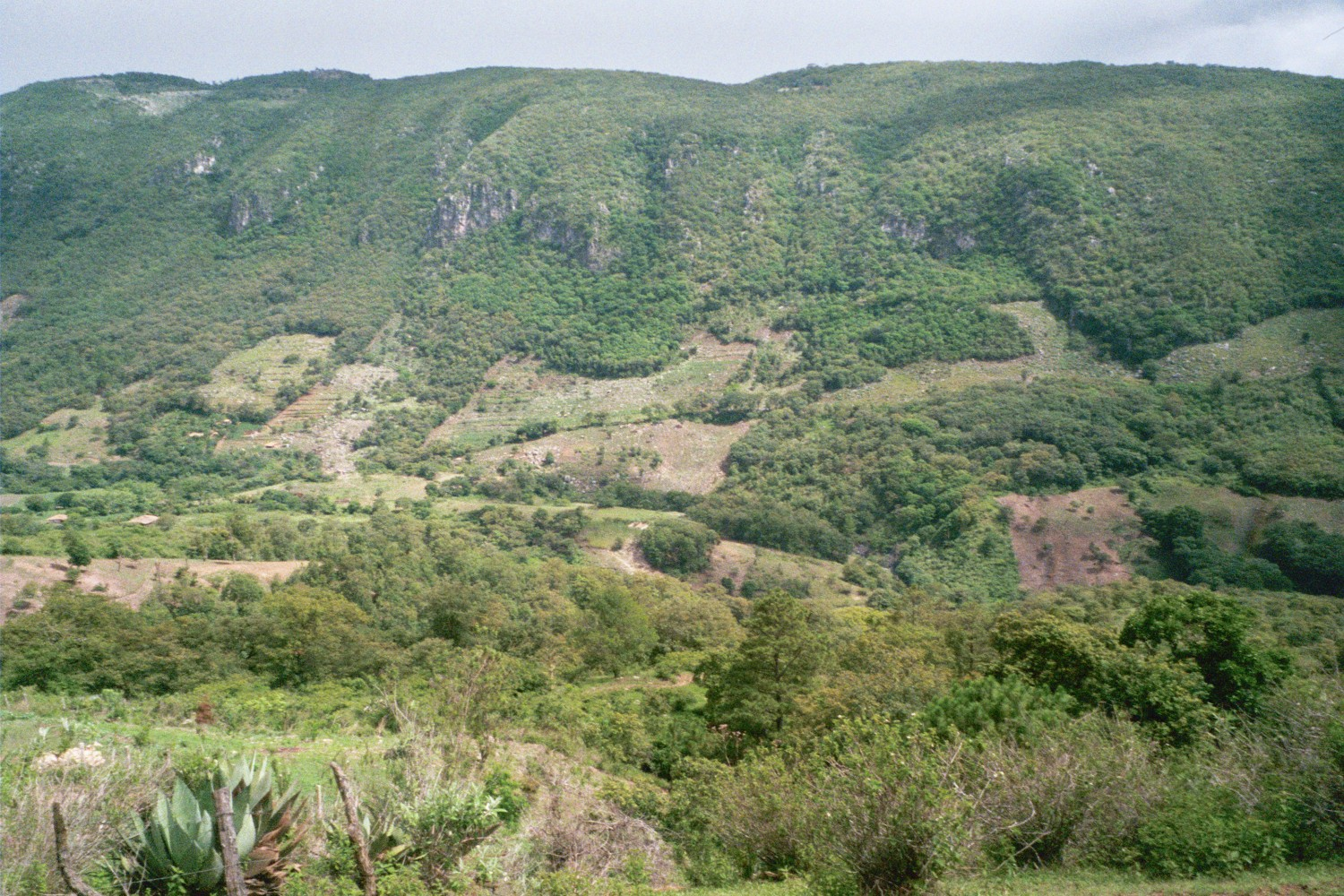
Forest fragmentation on Celaque's slopes

The success of the park was unknown until recent studies. Between the years 1987-1998 it was found that the area of open forested land decreased while mature forests became the largest forest class in the park. Forest fragmentation (measurement of area of bare patches and distances from one patch to another) decreased in areas without villages but increased in inhabited areas. However, with further examination, these results are less impressive. In the 11-year period the environment of the park had changed dramatically. These results were found in high elevations, remote and uninhabited areas of the park and in areas where the environment under examination was previously established. Meaning that the increase in mature forests was found in areas that already had mature trees but not in areas where open forest or agriculture land had been previously. Though the results of the park's conservation efforts were positive they aren't enough to save Celaque's biodiversity.

== Conservation studies ==
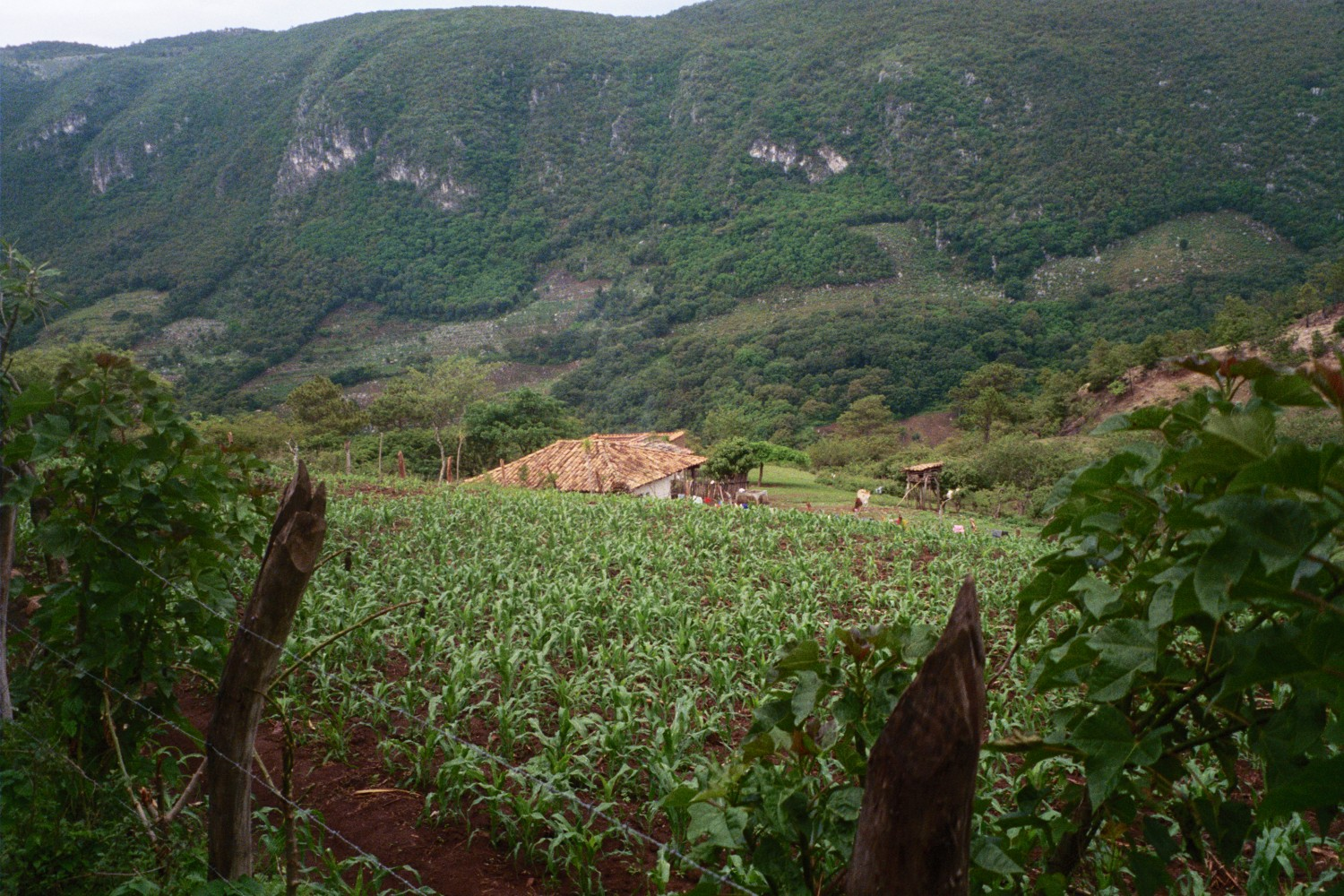
A family farm located in Celaque's borders

More recent studies on Celaque's Conservation efforts have shown less positive results. The change in the park's environment had slowed down after 1995. Though the park prohibits outside logging and agriculture, it does not restrict the communities that live inside the boundaries. The patchwork on the edges of the park had grown dramatically due to increase in community agriculture. Deeper inside the park more agriculture land is being used and much of that land is using unsustainable fertilizers. Inhabitants have also grown intensely. 8 communities in Celaque's upper third create a patchwork of villages. However, only 6% of the land is dedicated to small-scale farming and most of the damage is still being done through illegal logging and commercial agriculture. Due to the recent high demand of coffee beans, the slopes contain more coffee plantations than ever.

== Present efforts ==
Though the transformation of the land into a national park produced positive results, it wasn't enough to stop the unsustainable practices in the park. There are many NGOs in Honduras that are dedicated to saving Celaque's pristine slopes. One of which is The Federacion de Desarrollo Comunitario de Honduras (The Federation of Community Development of Honduras). The FEDECOH is dedicated to teaching communities sustainable farming practices. They use a 60-acre (240,000 m^{2}) farm called El Molino at the base of Celaque to teach soil conservation, crop rotation, biodiversity and other sustainable practices. Over ten years they have taught thousands of farmers in 120 rural communities. Their new project is ecotourism for Celaque National Park. Friends of Celaque is another organization that was founded by a few concerned individuals. Their goals are to create awareness through periodical reports, create alliances with other ecological organizations, attract ecologists, biologists and other scientists interested in park conservation and to prove that the citizens of the area will benefit from the conservation of the park's resources. Though these organizations and many others are doing a lot to protect Celaque National Park, more awareness needs to occur in order to preserve this very isolated yet special place.
