= Craugastor olanchano =

Conservation status
- Critically Endangered (IUCN 3.1)

Scientific classification
- Kingdom: Animalia
- Phylum: Chordata
- Class: Amphibia
- Order: Anura
- Clade: Brachycephaloidea
- Family: Craugastoridae
- Genus: Craugastor
- Species: C. olanchano

Binomial name
- Craugastor olanchano McCranie & Wilson, 1999

Species of frog

Craugastor olanchano is a species of frog in the family Craugastoridae. It is endemic to Honduras. Its natural habitats are subtropical or tropical moist montane forests and rivers.
