= Craugastor aurilegulus =

Conservation status
- Vulnerable (IUCN 3.1)

Scientific classification
- Kingdom: Animalia
- Phylum: Chordata
- Class: Amphibia
- Order: Anura
- Clade: Brachycephaloidea
- Family: Craugastoridae
- Genus: Craugastor
- Species: C. aurilegulus

Binomial name
- Craugastor aurilegulus (Savage, McCranie & Wilson, 1988)

Species of frog

Craugastor aurilegulus is a species of frog in the family Craugastoridae. It is endemic to Honduras. Its natural habitats are subtropical or tropical moist lowland forest, subtropical or tropical moist montane forest, and rivers. The species is threatened by habitat loss.
