= Craugastor pechorum =

Conservation status
- Endangered (IUCN 3.1)

Scientific classification
- Kingdom: Animalia
- Phylum: Chordata
- Class: Amphibia
- Order: Anura
- Clade: Brachycephaloidea
- Family: Craugastoridae
- Genus: Craugastor
- Species: C. pechorum

Binomial name
- Craugastor pechorum McCranie & Wilson, 1999

Species of frog

Craugastor pechorum is a species of frog in the family Craugastoridae. It is endemic to Honduras. Its natural habitats are subtropical or tropical moist lowland forests and rivers. It is threatened by habitat loss.
