= Honduran brook frog =

Conservation status
- Endangered (IUCN 3.1)

Scientific classification
- Kingdom: Animalia
- Phylum: Chordata
- Class: Amphibia
- Order: Anura
- Family: Hylidae
- Genus: Duellmanohyla
- Species: D. salvavida

Binomial name
- Duellmanohyla salvavida (McCranie & Wilson,1986)

Species of amphibian

The Honduran brook frog (Duellmanohyla salvavida) is a species of frog in the family Hylidae endemic to Honduras. Its natural habitats are subtropical or tropical moist lowland forests, subtropical or tropical moist montane forests, and rivers. Scientists have seen it between 90 and 1400 m above sea level in Honduras in rainforests.

The adult male frog measures 25.1–28 mm in snout-vent length and the adult female frog about 34 mm. The skin of the dorsum is light or dark green in color and the skin of the ventrum is yellow. There is a white stripe on the face underneath the eye down the side of the body. There is a whitish spot above the groin. The inner thighs are light yellow in color. The iris is red.

This frog is endangered for several reasons, principally habitat loss. Logging for lumber, urbanization, droughts, and floods, all affect the population. It is preyed upon by both native and introduced predators. This frog is subject to damage from UV light and the fungal disease chytridiomycosis.

The scientific name of this frog, salvavida, means "lifesaver." The scientists named it after a Honduran beer called Salvavida.
