= Ecnomiohyla minera =

Conservation status
- Vulnerable (IUCN 3.1)

Scientific classification
- Kingdom: Animalia
- Phylum: Chordata
- Class: Amphibia
- Order: Anura
- Family: Hylidae
- Genus: Ecnomiohyla
- Species: E. minera

Binomial name
- Ecnomiohyla minera (Wilson, McCranie & Williams, 1985)

Species of frog

Ecnomiohyla minera is a species of frog in the family Hylidae. It is endemic to Guatemala. Its natural habitat is subtropical or tropical moist montane forests. It is threatened by habitat loss.
