= Craugastor omoaensis =

Conservation status
- Extinct (1974) (IUCN 3.1)

Scientific classification
- Kingdom: Animalia
- Phylum: Chordata
- Class: Amphibia
- Order: Anura
- Clade: Brachycephaloidea
- Family: Craugastoridae
- Genus: Craugastor
- Species: †C. omoaensis

Binomial name
- †Craugastor omoaensis (McCranie & Wilson, 1997)

Synonyms
- Eleutherodactylus omoaensis McCranie & Wilson, 1997

Presumed extinct species of frog

Craugastor omoaensis, known commonly as the Sierra de Omoa streamside frog, is a presumed extinct species of frog in the family Craugastoridae. It is endemic to Honduras and also is one of 13 species of amphibians and reptiles that are endemic to the Sierra de Omoa. It is known from only 24 specimens studied. Its natural habitats are subtropical or tropical moist montane forests, rivers, and intermittent rivers. The Sierra de Omoa streamside frog was last seen in 1974. All subsequent expeditions seeking the frog have failed to locate any individuals, and it is presumed to have gone extinct.

== Taxonoomy ==
The type specimen of Craugastor omoaensis was collected from the namesake Sierra de Omoa mountains of Honduras by James Lynch and James Kezer in 1974, but it was not until 1997 that James McCranie and Larry Wilson would use it as the basis for their description of a new species. McCranie and Wilson originally placed it into the genus Eleutherodactylus, but it was later moved to Craugastor.

== Distribution and habitat ==
The frog has only ever been seen near streams in the cloud forest of the western Sierra de Omoa mountains, at elevations of 760–1,150 metres (2,490–3,770 ft).

== Description ==
The snout-vent length range for males is 26.2–30 mm (1.03–1.18 in), while its 25.6–38.4 mm (1.01–1.51 in) for females. Colouration consists of various shades of brown. The head of the frog is broad and flat, with a rounded snout, flared upper lips and prominent upper eyelids. Its forearms are slightly thicker than its upper arms, and its legs are long relative to its snout-vent length. The frog's skin is smooth to slightly wrinkled on the chin, throat and chest. For most individuals the same goes for the belly, but individuals whose backs have a more granular texture have wrinklier bellies.

== Conservation status ==
Craugastor omoaensis has not been sighted since the 1974 expedition that saw James Lynch collect the type specimen of the species from a small stream. In a 2004 assessment, the International Union for the Conservation of Nature and Natural Resources (IUCN) categorised the frog as Critically Endangered on the Red List after meeting the criteria set out by the 1996 IUCN Red List of Threatened Animals. In 2019 IUCN classified the species as extinct, with all expeditions seeking the frog have failed to locate any individuals. Habitat loss is the primary cause of the frog's presumed extinction, with chytridiomycosis possibly being a significant contributing factor.
