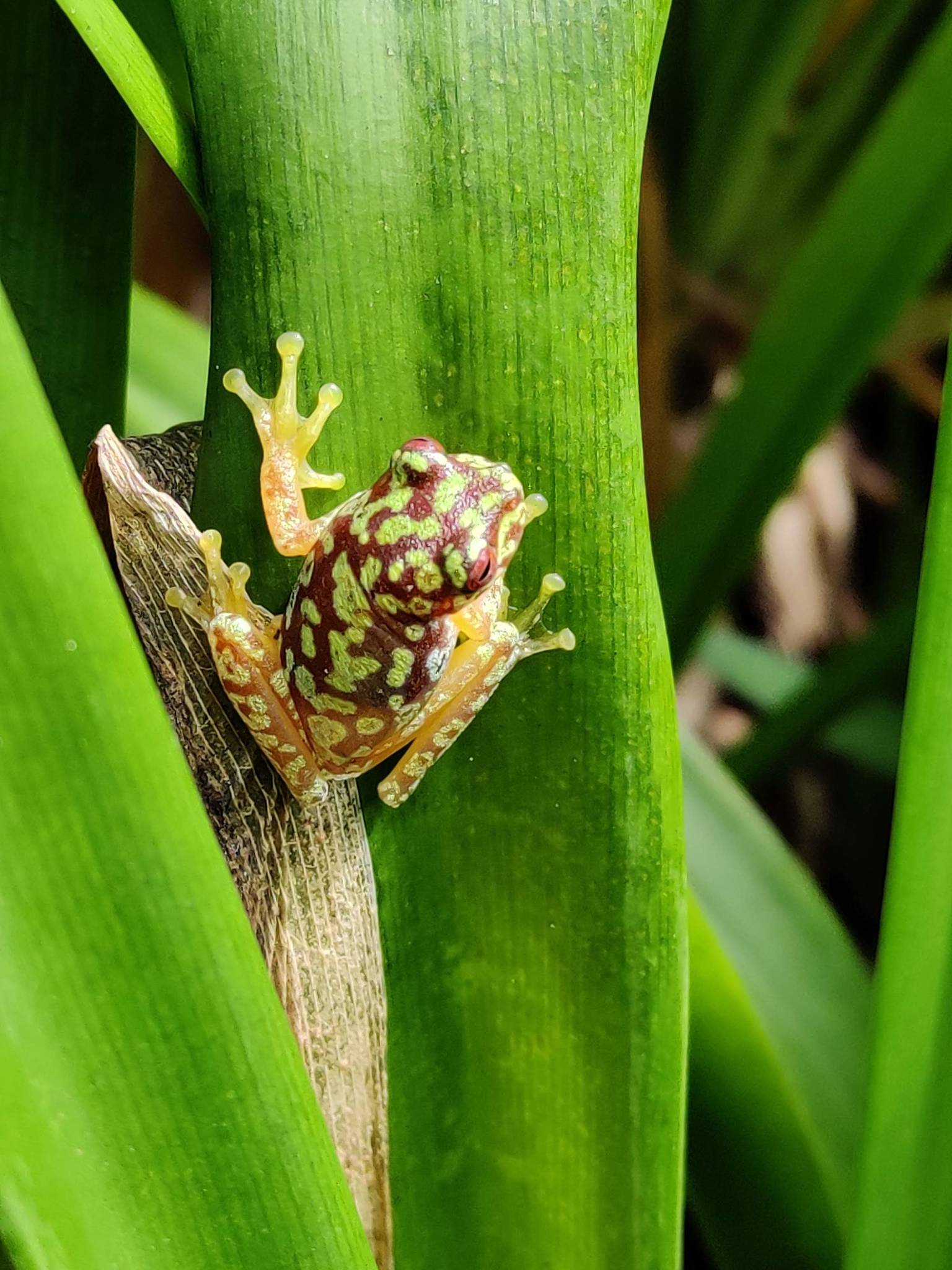

Conservation status
- Endangered (IUCN 3.1)

Scientific classification
- Kingdom: Animalia
- Phylum: Chordata
- Class: Amphibia
- Order: Anura
- Family: Hylidae
- Genus: Duellmanohyla
- Species: D. soralia

Binomial name
- Duellmanohyla soralia (Wilson and McCranie,1985)

Synonyms
- Hyla soralia Wilson and McCranie, 1985

= Copan brook frog =

Species of amphibian

The Copan brook frog (Duellmanohyla soralia) is a species of frog in the family Hylidae found in northeastern Guatemala and northwestern Honduras, specifically in the Sierra del Merendón, Sierra de Omoa, Sierra de Caral, and Sierra Espíritu Santo ranges. The colouring of this species is very distinctive and the specific name soralia comes from the resemblance of its markings to the vegetative structures on some crustose lichens.

== Description ==
The Copan brook frog is a small frog, the males growing to about 32 mm (1.3 in) and the females to 38 mm (1.5 in). The snout is very blunt and the prominent eyes have red irises. The male has a single vocal sac under the throat, with a pair of vocal slits. The dorsal surface is brown with a well-marked pattern of green, olive, and black, pale-edged spots or blotches. The ventral surface is yellow and the outer surface of the fore limb has a patterning of white streaks.

== Distribution ==
This tree frog is endemic to mountainous parts of northwest Honduras and northeast Guatemala. Its habitat is moist tropical forest and cloud forest at altitudes of up to 1,570 m (5,150 ft) above sea level.

== Biology ==
D. soralia is nocturnal and is usually found in or near streams, in low vegetation and on waterside rocks. Breeding takes place between May and July. The tadpoles are a pale yellowish-green colour with iridescent green spots and red eyes. They inhabit shallow pools.

== Status ==
Duellmanohyla soralia is listed as Endangered in the IUCN Red List of Threatened Species. Numbers of frogs are dwindling, and in the Cusuco National Park, where the habitat is fully protected, at least part of the cause of the decline is believed to be the disease chytridiomycosis caused by the fungus Batrachochytrium dendrobatidis. Elsewhere this frog is also threatened by loss of habitat caused by forest clearance for agricultural purposes and by water pollution.
