= Plectrohyla insolita =

Conservation status
- Endangered (IUCN 3.1)

Scientific classification
- Kingdom: Animalia
- Phylum: Chordata
- Class: Amphibia
- Order: Anura
- Family: Hylidae
- Genus: Plectrohyla
- Species: P. insolita

Binomial name
- Plectrohyla insolita (McCranie, Wilson & Williams, 1993)

Synonyms
- Hyla insolita McCranie, Wilson, and Williams, 1993; Isthmohyla insolita Faivovich et al., 2005

Species of amphibian

Plectrohyla insolita is a species of frog in the family Hylidae. It is endemic to Honduras, where it is found in lower elevation montane stream valleys. It is threatened by deforestation due to agriculture, fires caused by trees killed by boring pine beetles, and climate change.
