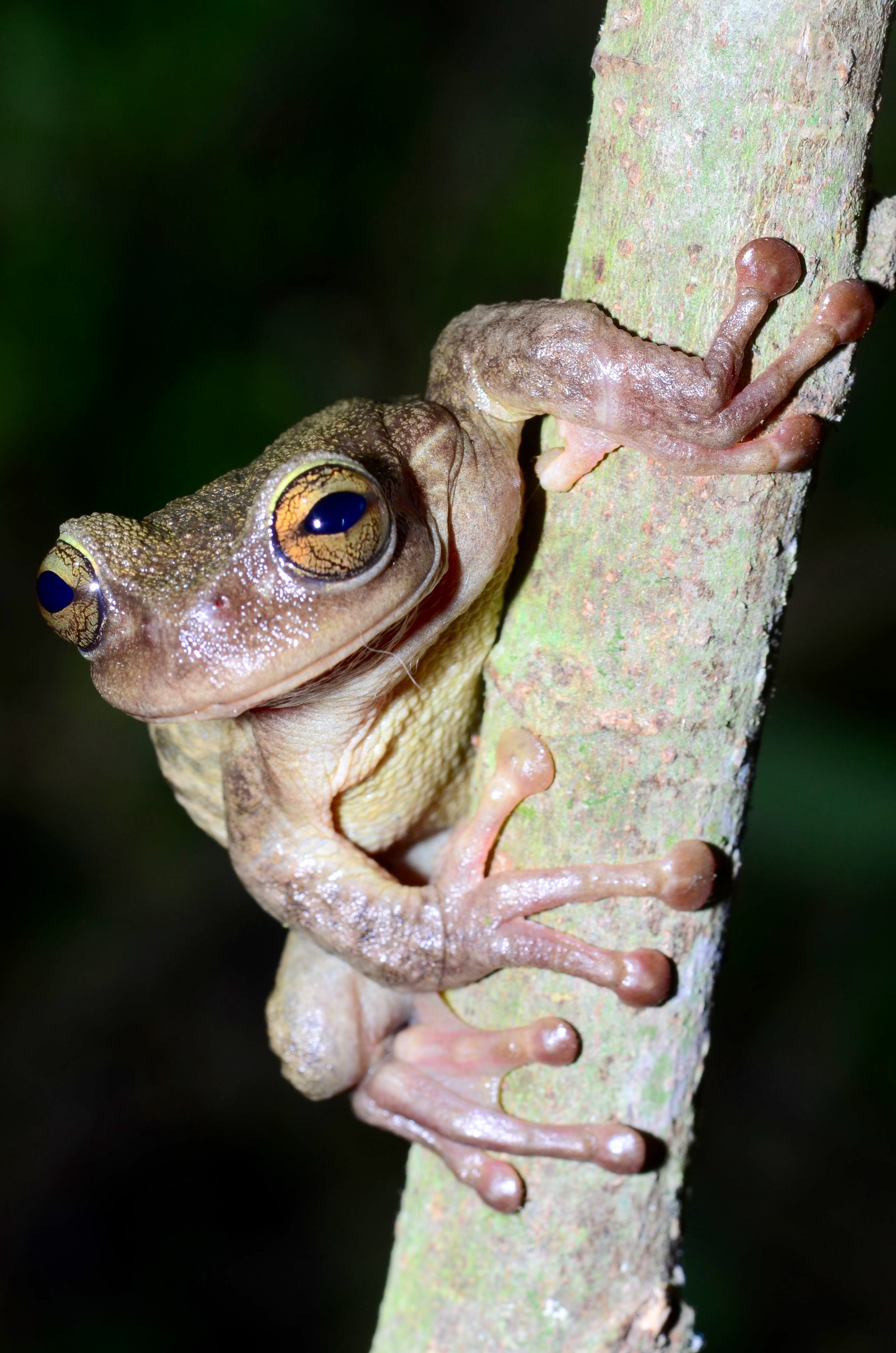

Conservation status
- Critically Endangered (IUCN 3.1)

Scientific classification
- Kingdom: Animalia
- Phylum: Chordata
- Class: Amphibia
- Order: Anura
- Family: Hylidae
- Genus: Plectrohyla
- Species: P. teuchestes

Binomial name
- Plectrohyla teuchestes Duellman and Campbell, 1992

Synonyms
- Hyla teuchestes (Duellman and Campbell, 1992)

= Plectrohyla teuchestes =

Species of frog

Plectrohyla teuchestes is a species of frog in the family Hylidae. It is endemic to Guatemala and only known with certainty from its type locality on the southern slope of the Sierra de Xucaneb, in the Alta Verapaz Department. There is also a report from another locality in Alta Verapaz. Frogs from Honduras now known as Plectrohyla exquisita were formerly included in this species.

Its natural habitats are tropical moist montane forests where it lives near streams and waterfalls at about 1,000 m (3,300 ft) above sea level. Breeding takes place in streams. As of 2004, the only known location was facing habitat loss, and no specimens had been located, despite searches. Chytridiomycosis might also be a threat.
