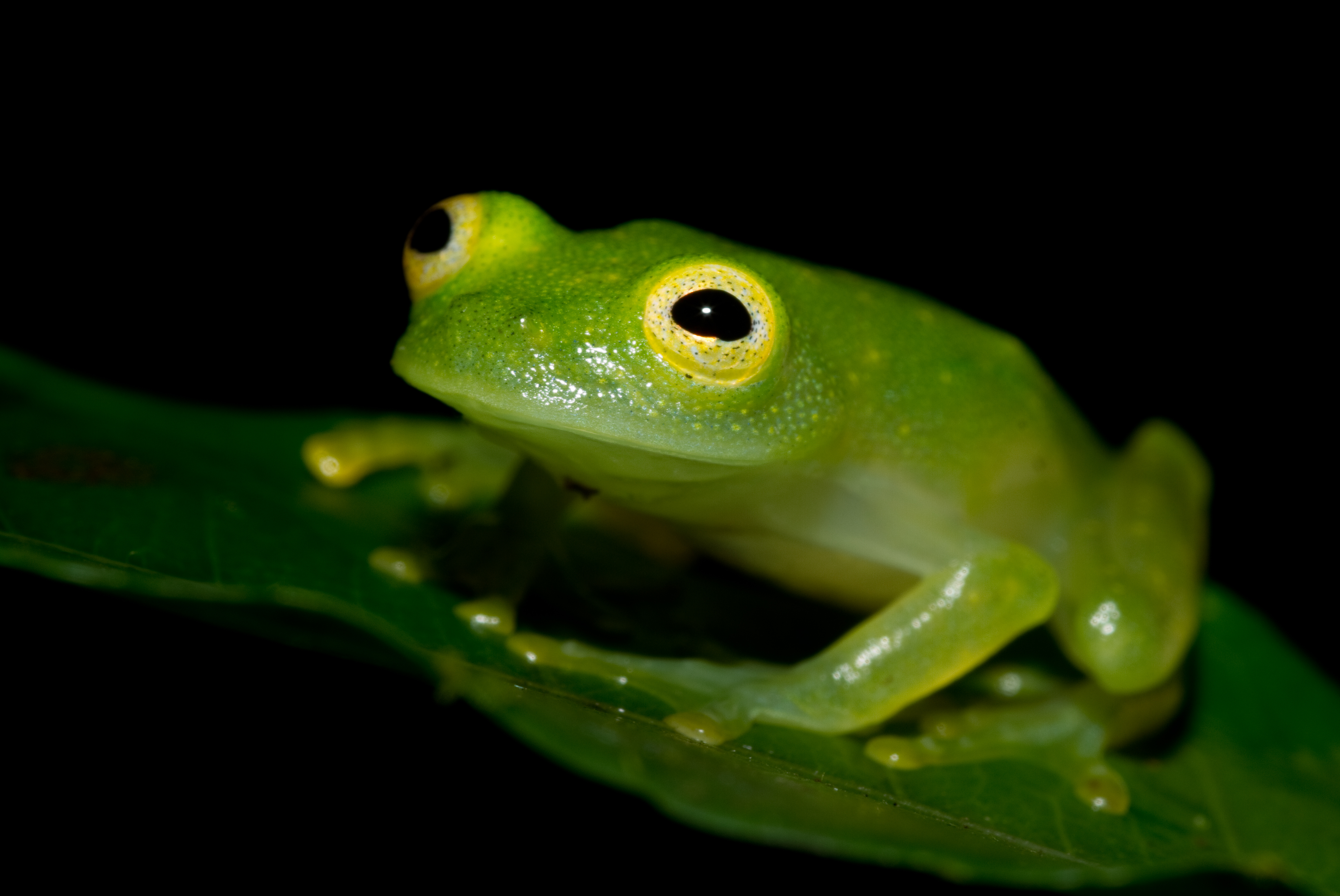

Conservation status
- Least Concern (IUCN 3.1)

Scientific classification
- Kingdom: Animalia
- Phylum: Chordata
- Class: Amphibia
- Order: Anura
- Family: Centrolenidae
- Genus: Hyalinobatrachium
- Species: H. colymbiphyllum

Binomial name
- Hyalinobatrachium colymbiphyllum (Taylor, 1949)

Synonyms
- Centrolenella colymbiphyllum Taylor, 1949; Hyalinobatrachium crybetes McCranie and Wilson, 1997

= Hyalinobatrachium colymbiphyllum =

Species of amphibian

Hyalinobatrachium colymbiphyllum, also called the bare-hearted glass frog, plantation glass frog and the cricket glass frog, is a species of frog in the family Centrolenidae that is found in moist forests, often near streams, in countries in Central America and South America. They are small, green frogs with many similarities to other glass frogs, however, they have the most transparent undersides of any glass frogs. Their transparent undersides make them ideal bio-indicators for how global warming and other threats are affecting the animals in the forests.

== Characteristics ==
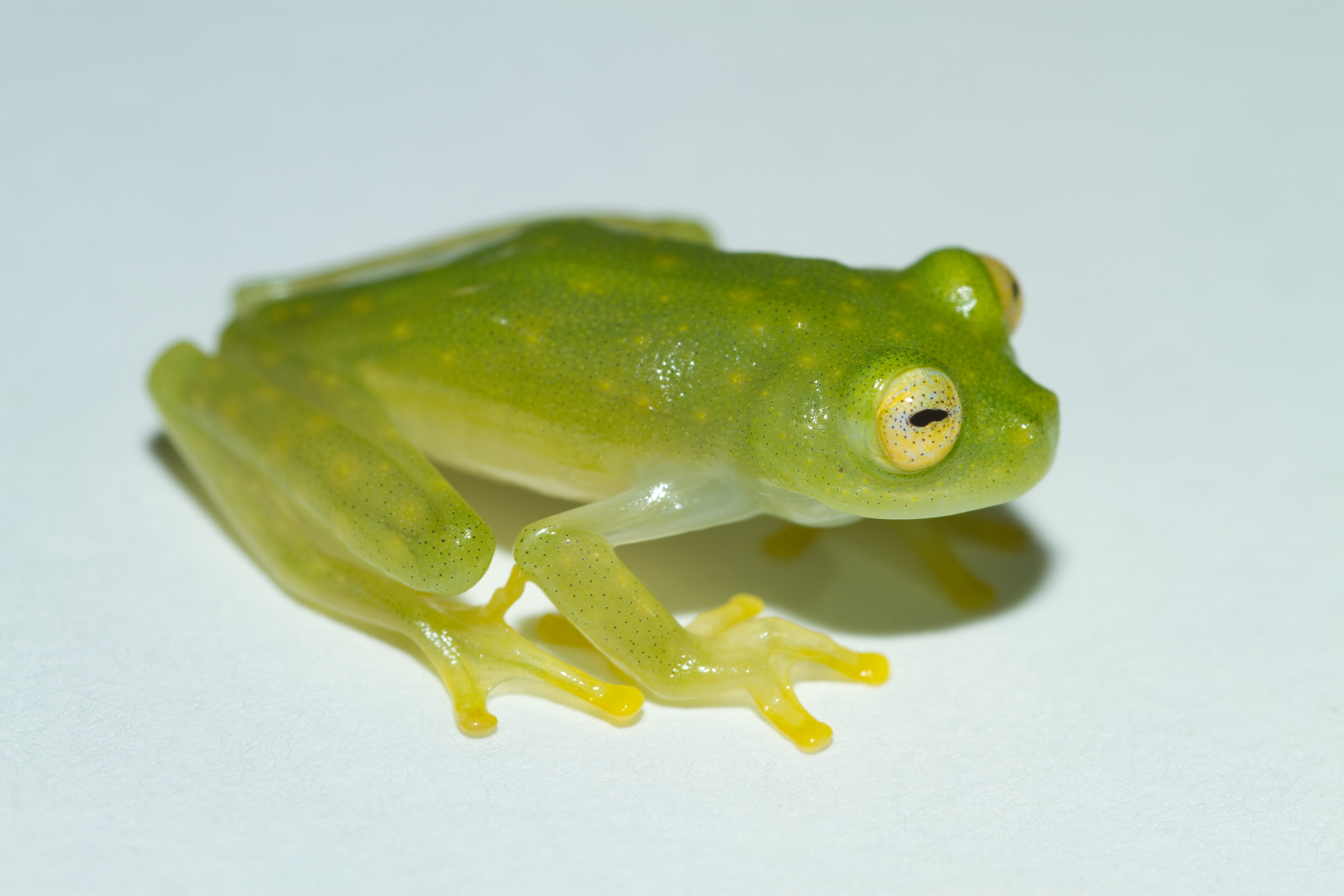

Bare-hearted glass frogs are similar in features to most glass frogs but have their own distinct characteristics. Like most glass frogs, they are small and green with yellow spots and transparent undersides. The transparent undersides are the main feature of most glass frogs, but the bare-hearted glass frog has the clearest underside, allowing almost full visibility of their internal organs. Their transparent skin also makes them difficult to see, as well as their size. They are very small, with male frogs being 22–27 mm (0.87–1.06 in) long and females 24.5–29 mm (0.96–1.14 in) long. Other distinct characteristics of bare-hearted glass frogs are their forward-facing golden eyes and nostrils raised from their heads. They spend time moving throughout the forests and streams, their front fingers being less webbed and more isolated, while their back feet are heavily webbed, allow them mobility in trees and in water.

Bare-hearted glass frog tadpoles are very small, less than 9.5 mm (0.37 in). They are brown with light undersides and have long bodies with pointed tails for swimming while they mature in the streams.

Most Amphibians, including the glass frog, have innate embryonic resistance and defenses hat are reflecting in their social and environmental structures. It is shown that a frog's skin is a great host for microbe community diversity and may vary depending on horizontal (conspecifics), environmental, or vertical transmissions.

== Habitat ==
The bare-hearted glass frog is found in Honduras (Olancho Department), central and southeastern Costa Rica, Panama, and western Colombia along the western slopes of Cordillera Occidental. They live near streams, or other bodies of water, that are surrounded by rainforests. During breeding season, they live beside or directly above streams on leaves and bush that dangle over the water in order for eggs to hatch into the stream. The Costa Rican Amphibian Research Center (CRARC), founded by Brian Kubicki, has found that they live higher in trees or near waterfalls while not in breeding season. There is not much research on what they eat, but like most frogs, they probably eat small insects.

Since they rely on the presence of trees, they are most threatened by the destruction of their habitat from deforestation. Even though they face threats to their environment, according to the International Union for Conservation of Nature, they are considered to be "least concern" for extinction. However, with many other glass frogs declining in population, bare-hearted glass frogs are also at risk. Global warming is also a threat to bare-hearted glass frogs. They need moisture and rain in order to not dry out, and lack of rain or warmer conditions can be dangerous. Biologists are interested in further researching and observing bare-hearted glass frogs as they can be good bio-indicators of how global warming is affecting, not only frogs, but other species in rainforests. Along with global warming concerns, studies have shown that predation events of Hyalinobatrachium colymbiphylum are become more widely documented and understood. Scientists are now documenting new sites of Ornate Cat-eyed snake species predation on the glass frogs in Costa Rica, where they feed on the glass frogs, toads, eggs and larvae, and small lizards (Escalante and Acuña).

== Breeding ==
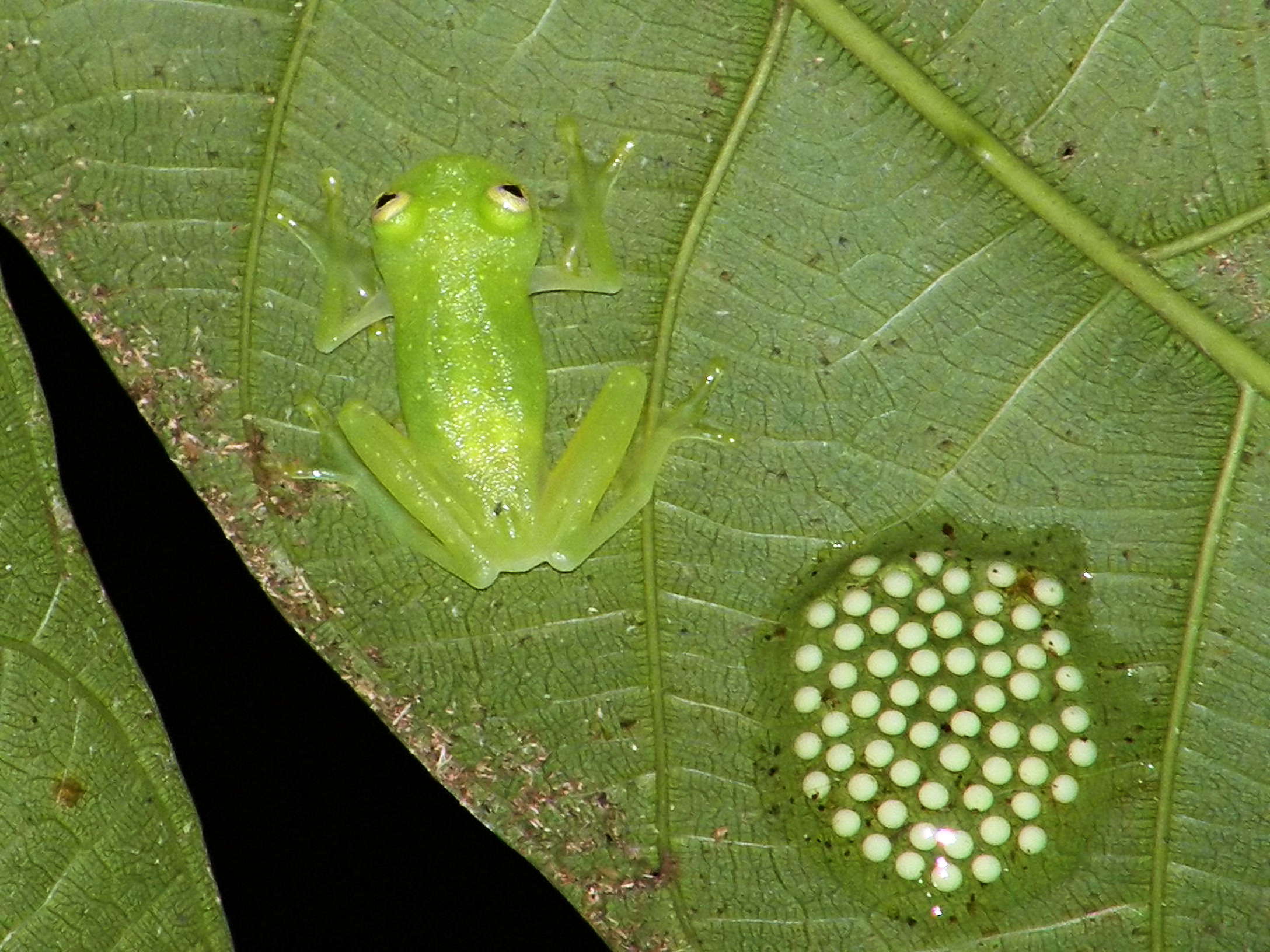

Breeding season is during rainy season, from late fall to spring. The process of breeding starts with males selecting a leaf or bush near a stream as their calling ground. Then they call to attract females, the sound is similar to a cricket, which is where they get one of their common names from. They stay in one spot to call from and will fight other males for territory and to win females. The fights between males are over a specific leaf or calling area and are won by one male pinning the other down. Once they attract a female, the eggs are laid on the underside of a leaf. Batches are 50-75 eggs, and are laid under leaves above streams where they are cared for by the male. The male's responsibility is to protect and keep the eggs moist, he does this through urination and osmosis (a process where water passes through the skin). Due to the nocturnal nature of the frogs, the male guards the batch during the night but eggs are stolen by wasps when they are not guarded. The wasps steal the eggs one at a time and can steal entire batches while the eggs are not guarded during the day. The eggs are cared for and mature while on the leaf for about two weeks. Once the eggs hatch, they either wiggle until they drop into the streams or are washed off the leaves by the rain into the streams, where they finish their larval development. Studies have also shown that glass frogs can exhibit complex male-parental responses in unusual circumstances like problems in embryonic development. For instance, a male can make life-stage requirement decisions based on environmental risks. An embryo could be capsule-less and are at risk of dehydration and infection. The male parent, in this case, can make the ultimate decision to remove the embryos that might risk the survivability of the other embryos in the clutch or undergo a 'rescue strategy' to save the offspring.
