= Jeffrey A. Wilson =

American paleontologist

Jeffrey A. Wilson, also known as JAW, is a paleontologist and professor of geological sciences and assistant curator at the Museum of Paleontology at the University of Michigan.

His doctoral dissertation was on sauropod evolution and phylogeny, and he has continued this work in cladistic analysis and revision of the group (see e.g. Wilson and Sereno 1994, 1998, Wilson 2005b, and especially Wilson 2002). With Paul Sereno, he defined the clades Macronaria and Somphospondyli (Wilson & Sereno 1998).

Wilson was also involved in the discovery and description of Pabwehshi pakistanensis, the first discovery of decent (diagnostic) Cretaceous crocodylian fossil remains from the Indian subcontinent, in the discovery of Rajasaurus narmadensis, the most completely known theropod dinosaur from India and a member of the family Abelisauridae, description of a number of North African dinosaurs (theropods and sauropods) from Niger, and rediscriptions of the Cretaceous sauropods Titanosaurus colberti (as Isisaurus) and Nemegtosaurus (previously thought to be a diplodocoid, but now recognised as a titanosaur).

His younger brother, Dr. Gregory P. Wilson, studies Mesozoic mammals and is currently an assistant professor in the Department of Biology at the University of Washington, and adjunct curator of vertebrate paleontology at the Burke Museum of Natural History and Culture.

== List of dinosaurs named ==
Name	Year	Status	Coauthor(s)		Notes	Images
Afrovenator	1994.	Valid taxon.	Paul Sereno; Wilson; Larsson	Dutheil; Sues		Deltadromeus Isisaurus Nigersaurus Rugops Suchomimus
Deltadromeus	1996.	Valid taxon.	Paul Sereno.; Dutheil.; Iarochene.; Larsson.	Lyon.; Magwene.; Sidor.; Varricchio.		Deltadromeus Isisaurus Nigersaurus Rugops Suchomimus
Isisaurus	2003.	Valid taxon.	Wilson.	Upchurch.		Deltadromeus Isisaurus Nigersaurus Rugops Suchomimus
Jobaria	1999.	Valid taxon.	Paul Sereno.; Beck.; Dutheil.; Larsson.; Lyon.	Moussa.; Sadleir.; Sidor.; Varricchio.; Gregory P. Wilson.		Deltadromeus Isisaurus Nigersaurus Rugops Suchomimus
Nigersaurus	1999.	Valid taxon.	Paul Sereno.; Beck.; Dutheil.; Larsson.; Lyon.	Moussa.; Sadleir.; Sidor.; Varricchio.; Gregory P. Wilson.		Deltadromeus Isisaurus Nigersaurus Rugops Suchomimus
Rajasaurus	2003.	Valid taxon.	Wilson.; Paul Sereno.; Srivastava.	Bhatt.; Khosla.; Sahni.		Deltadromeus Isisaurus Nigersaurus Rugops Suchomimus
Rugops	2004.	Valid taxon.	Paul Sereno.; Wilson.	Conrad.		Deltadromeus Isisaurus Nigersaurus Rugops Suchomimus
Spinostropheus	2004.	Valid taxon.	Paul Sereno.; Wilson.	Conrad.		Deltadromeus Isisaurus Nigersaurus Rugops Suchomimus
Suchomimus	1998.	Valid taxon.	Paul Sereno.; Beck.; Dutheil.; Gado.; Larsson.; Lyon.	Marcot.; Rauhut.; Sadleir.; Sidor.; Varricchio.; Gregory P. Wilson.		Deltadromeus Isisaurus Nigersaurus Rugops Suchomimus

== Bibliography ==
- Wilson, J. A. and Sereno, P. C. (1994) Higher-level phylogeny of sauropod dinosaurs. Journal of Vertebrate Paleontology, Supplement 14:52A.
- Wilson, J.A. & Sereno, P.C. (1998). Early evolution and Higher-level phylogeny of sauropod dinosaurs. Society of Vertebrate Paleontology, Memoir 5, 1-68. (includes definitions of the clades Macronaria and Somphospondyli)
- Sereno, P. C., Beck, A.L., Dutheil, D.B., Gado, B., Larsson, H.C.E., Lyon, G.H., Marcot, J. D., Rauhut, O. W. M., Sadleir, R.W., Sidor, C.A., Varricchio, D.J., Wilson, G. P. & Wilson, J. A. 1998. A long-snouted predatory dinosaur from Africa and the evolution of spinosaurids. Science 282:1298-1302. document in pdf format (description of Suchomimus, and spinosaur relationships)
- Wilson, J. A. and M. T. Carrano, (1999). Titanosaurs and the origin of 'wide-gauge' trackways: a biomechanical and systematic perspective on sauropod locomotion. Paleobiology 25:252-267. (Titanosaurs had a different gait to earlier sauropods - the legs are spaced further apart, may have facilitated tripodal feeding)
- Wilson, J. A., R. N. Martinez & O. Alcober. (1999). Distal tail segment of a titanosaur (Dinosauria: Sauropoda) from the Upper Cretaceous of Mendoza, Argentina. Journal of Vertebrate Paleontology 19:591-594.
- Wilson, J A. (1999). A nomenclature for vertebral laminae in sauropods and other saurischian dinosaurs. Journal of Vertebrate Paleontology 19(4):639-653. (vertebral laminae can play an important role in sauropod classification)
- Wilson, J.A. (1999) The evolution and phylogeny of sauropod dinosaurs. Ph.D. dissertation, University of Chicago, 384pp [in 2 vols.]
- Sereno, P.C., Beck, A.L., Dutheil, D.B., Larsson, H.C.E., Lyon, G.H., Moussa, B., Sadleir, R.W., Sidor, C.A., Varricchio, D.J., Wilson, G. P. & Wilson, J. A., (1999), Cretaceous Sauropods from the Sahara and the Uneven Rate of Skeletal Evolution Among Dinosaurs, Science 286(5443): 1342-1347 (Nov 12 1999) (describes two new African sauropods: Jobaria tiguidensis, a late persisting primitive sauropod, and Nigersaurus taqueti, a Rebbachisaur))
- Wilson, J.A., Malkani, M.S., and Gingerich, P.D. (2001) New crocodyliform (Reptilia, Mesoeucrocodylia) from the Upper Cretaceous Pab Formation of Vitakri, Balochistan (Pakistan). Contributions from the Museum of Paleontology, University of Michigan 30(12): 321–336. (on Pabwehshi pakistanensis)
- Wilson, J.A. (2002) Sauropod dinosaur phylogeny: critique and cladistic analysis, Zoological Journal of the Linnean Society 136(2):215-275 (a detailed cladistic analysis of sauropod phylogeny)
- Wilson, J.A. and Upchurch, P (2003) A revision of Titanosaurus Lydekker (Dinosauria-Sauropoda), the first dinosaur genus with a "Gondwanan" distribution, Journal of Systematic Palaeontology Volume 1 Issue 3 - September 2003 (a revision of 14 species of the genus Titanosaurus shows that only five of these are valid. The type species T. indicus is considered a nomen dubium, and therefore the abandonment of suprageneric taxa based on it - e.g. Titanosaurinae, Titanosauridae, and Titanosauroidea - is suggested. The species T. colberti is renamed Isisaurus colberti)
- Wilson, J.A., Sereno, P.C., Srivastava, S., Bhatt, D.K., Khosla, A. and Sahni, A. (2003) A new abelisaurid (Dinosauria, Theropoda) from the Lameta Formation (Cretaceous, Maastrichtian) of India. Contributions from the Museum of Paleontology, University of Michigan 31(1):1-42 (description of Rajasaurus narmadensis)
- Wilson, J.A. (2005). Redescription of the Mongolian sauropod Nemegtosaurus mongoliensis Nowinski (Dinosauria: Saurischia) and comments on Late Cretaceous sauropod diversity. Journal of Systematic Palaeontology 3: 283–318. (shows that Nemegtosaurus and Quaesitosaurus are closely related and belong to the titanosaur group, rather than the diplodocoidea; redefines the family Nemegtosauridae. See New Nemegtosaurus paper for more.
- Curry Rogers, K. A. and Wilson, J.A. 2005, The Sauropods: Evolution and Paleobiology, University of California Press, Berkeley, ISBN 0-520-24623-3
- Wilson, J.A. (2005b) "Overview of Sauropod Phylogeny and Evolution", in The Sauropods: Evolution and Paleobiology (broad overview of phylogenetic characteristics and evolution development of the main sauropod clades, also phylocode-style definitions for each clade.
- Wilson, J. A. and Sereno, P. C. (2005) "Structure and Evolution of a Sauropod Tooth Battery" in The Sauropods: Evolution and Paleobiology (Nigersaurus skull and dentition, illustrating Rebbachisaur feeding adaptations)
