= Larry David Wilson =

American herpetologist (1940–2024)

- Born: April 10, 1940
- Died: April 28, 2024 (aged 84)
- Education: Louisiana State University
- Known for: Descriptions of numerous species of amphibians and reptiles from Central America
- Scientific career
- Fields: Herpetology
- Workplaces: Instituto Regional de Biodiversidad (IRBio), Honduras

Larry David Wilson (10 April 1940 – 28 April 2024) was an American herpetologist who graduated from Louisiana State University and worked at the Instituto Regional de Biodiversidad (IRBio) in Honduras. He is regarded as one of the most important researchers into the knowledge and conservation of the Mesoamerican Herpetofauna. He published nearly 500 papers and described dozens of new species.

== Species described ==
- Atelophryniscus chrysophorus
- Bufo leucomyos
- Craugastor anciano
- Craugastor aurilegulus
- Craugastor chrysozetetes
- Craugastor cruzi
- Craugastor epochthidius
- Craugastor fecundus
- Craugastor olanchano
- Craugastor omoaensis
- Craugastor pechorum
- Craugastor saltuarius
- Duellmanohyla salvavida
- Duellmanohyla soralia
- Ecnomiohyla minera
- Ecnomiohyla salvaje
- Exerodonta catracha
- Hyalinobatrachium cardiacalyptum
- Hyalinobatrachium crybetes
- Isthmohyla insolita
- Plectrohyla chrysopleura
- Plectrohyla dasypus
- Plectrohyla exquisita
- Plectrohyla psiloderma
- Ptychohyla hypomykter
