= List of amphibians of Costa Rica =

This is a list of amphibians found in Costa Rica. A total of 194 amphibian species have been recorded in Costa Rica, three of which are extinct. This list is derived from the database listing of AmphibiaWeb. Each species is listed by its scientific name, in taxonomic order, followed by the Red Book conservation status - extinct (EX), extinct in the wild (EW), critically endangered (CR), endangered (EN), vulnerable (VU), near threatened (NT), least concern (LC), data deficient (DD) or not evaluated (NE).

== Caecilians (Gymnophiona) ==
=== Caeciliidae ===
Order: Gymnophiona. Family: Caeciliidae

- Oscaecilia osae (DD)

== Salamanders (Caudata) ==
=== Caudata ===
Order: Caudata. Family: Plethodontidae

- Bolitoglossa alvaradoi (EN)
- Bolitoglossa bramei (DD)
- Bolitoglossa cerroensis (LC)
- Bolitoglossa colonnea (LC)
- Bolitoglossa compacta (EN)
- Bolitoglossa diminuta (VU)
- Bolitoglossa epimela (DD)
- Bolitoglossa gomezi (DD)
- Bolitoglossa gracilis (VU)
- Bolitoglossa lignicolor (VU)
- Bolitoglossa marmorea (EN)
- Bolitoglossa minutula (EN)
- Bolitoglossa nigrescens (EN)
- Bolitoglossa obscura (VU)
- Bolitoglossa pesrubra (VU)
- Bolitoglossa robinsoni
- Bolitoglossa robusta (LC)
- Bolitoglossa schizodactyla (LC)
- Bolitoglossa sombra (VU)
- Bolitoglossa sooyorum (EN)
- Bolitoglossa striatula (LC)
- Bolitoglossa subpalmata (EN)
- Bolitoglossa tica (EN)
- Nototriton abscondens (LC)
- Nototriton gamezi (VU)
- Nototriton guanacaste (VU)
- Nototriton major (CR)
- Nototriton picadoi (NT)
- Nototriton richardi (NT)
- Nototriton tapanti (VU)
- Oedipina alfaroi (VU)
- Oedipina alleni (LC)
- Oedipina altura (CR)
- Oedipina carablanca (EN)
- Oedipina collaris (DD)
- Oedipina cyclocauda (LC)
- Oedipina gracilis (EN)
- Oedipina grandis (EN)
- Oedipina pacificensis (LC)
- Oedipina paucidentata (CR)
- Oedipina poelzi (EN)
- Oedipina pseudouniformis (EN)
- Oedipina savagei (DD)
- Oedipina uniformis (NT)

== Frogs and toads (Anura) ==
=== Bufonidae ===
Order: Anura. Family: Bufonidae

- Atelopus chiriquiensis (CR)
- Atelopus chirripoensis
- Atelopus senex (CR)
- Atelopus varius (CR)
- Incilius aucoinae (LC)
- Incilius chompipe (VU)
- Incilius coccifer (LC)
- Incilius coniferus (LC)
- Incilius epioticus (LC)
- Incilius fastidiosus (CR)
- Incilius guanacaste (DD)
- Incilius holdridgei (CR)
- Incilius luetkenii (LC)
- Incilius melanochlorus (LC)
- Incilius periglenes (EX)
- Incilius valliceps (LC)
- Rhaebo haematiticus (LC)
- Rhinella marina (LC)

=== Centrolenidae ===
Order: Anura. Family: Centrolenidae

- Cochranella euknemos (LC)
- Cochranella granulosa (LC)
- Espadarana prosoblepon (LC)
- Hyalinobatrachium chirripoi (LC)
- Hyalinobatrachium colymbiphyllum (LC)
- Hyalinobatrachium fleischmanni (LC)
- Hyalinobatrachium talamancae (LC)
- Hyalinobatrachium valerioi (LC)
- Hyalinobatrachium vireovittatum (DD)
- Sachatamia albomaculata (LC)
- Sachatamia ilex (LC)
- Teratohyla pulverata (LC)
- Teratohyla spinosa (LC)

=== Craugastoridae ===
Order: Anura. Family: Craugastoridae

- Craugastor andi (CR)
- Craugastor angelicus (CR)
- Craugastor bransfordii (LC)
- Craugastor catalinae (CR)
- Craugastor crassidigitus (LC)
- Craugastor cuaquero (DD)
- Craugastor escoces (CR)
- Craugastor fitzingeri (LC)
- Craugastor fleischmanni (CR)
- Craugastor gollmeri (LC)
- Craugastor gulosus (EN)
- Craugastor megacephalus (LC)
- Craugastor melanostictus (LC)
- Craugastor mimus (LC)
- Craugastor noblei (LC)
- Craugastor obesus (EN)
- Craugastor persimilis (VU)
- Craugastor phasma (DD)
- Craugastor podiciferus (NT)
- Craugastor polyptychus (LC)
- Craugastor ranoides (CR)
- Craugastor rayo (DD)
- Craugastor rhyacobatrachus (EN)
- Craugastor rugosus (LC)
- Craugastor stejnegerianus (LC)
- Craugastor talamancae (LC)
- Craugastor taurus (CR)
- Craugastor underwoodi (LC)

=== Dendrobatidae ===
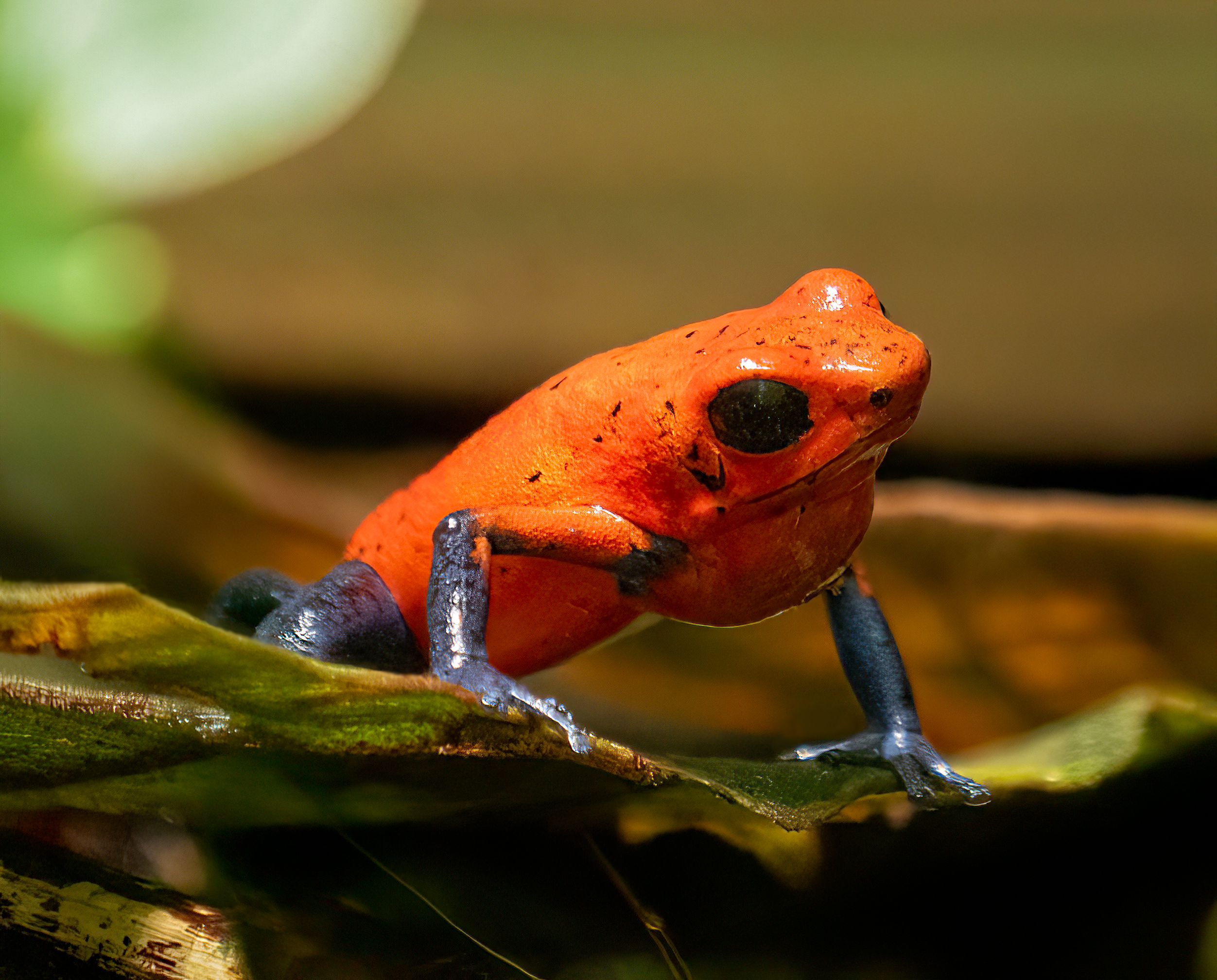
Strawberry poison-dart frog (Oophaga pumilio)

Order: Anura. Family: Dendrobatidae

- Allobates talamancae (LC)
- Dendrobates auratus (LC)
- Oophaga granulifera (VU)
- Oophaga pumilio (LC)
- Phyllobates lugubris (LC)
- Phyllobates vittatus (EN)
- Silverstoneia flotator (LC)
- Silverstoneia nubicola (NT)

=== Eleutherodactylidae ===
Order: Anura. Family: Eleutherodactylidae

- Diasporus diastema (LC)
- Diasporus hylaeformis (LC)
- Diasporus tigrillo (DD)
- Diasporus ventrimaculatus
- Diasporus vocator (LC)
- Eleutherodactylus coqui (LC)
- Eleutherodactylus johnstonei (LC)

=== Hemiphractidae ===
Order: Anura – Family: Hemiphractidae

- Horned marsupial frog Gastrotheca cornuta EN

=== Hylidae ===
Order: Anura. Family: Hylidae

- Agalychnis annae (EN)
- Agalychnis callidryas (LC)
- Agalychnis lemur (CR)
- Agalychnis saltator (LC)
- Agalychnis spurrelli (LC)
- Anotheca spinosa (LC)
- Cruziohyla calcarifer (LC)
- Cruziohyla sylviae (LC)
- Dendropsophus ebraccatus (LC)
- Dendropsophus microcephalus (LC)
- Dendropsophus phlebodes (LC)
- Duellmanohyla lythrodes (EN)
- Duellmanohyla rufioculis (LC)
- Duellmanohyla uranochroa (CR)
- Ecnomiohyla fimbrimembra (EN)
- Ecnomiohyla miliaria (VU)
- Ecnomiohyla sukia
- Hyloscirtus colymba (CR)
- Hyloscirtus palmeri (LC)
- Hypsiboas rosenbergi (LC)
- Hypsiboas rufitelus (LC)
- Isthmohyla angustilineata (CR)
- Isthmohyla calypsa (CR)
- Isthmohyla debilis (CR)
- Isthmohyla lancasteri (LC)
- Isthmohyla picadoi (NT)
- Isthmohyla pictipes (EN)
- Isthmohyla pseudopuma (LC)
- Isthmohyla rivularis (CR)
- Isthmohyla tica (CR)
- Isthmohyla xanthosticta (DD)
- Isthmohyla zeteki (NT)
- Osteopilus septentrionalis (LC)
- Ptychohyla legleri (EN)
- Scinax boulengeri (LC)
- Scinax elaeochroa (LC)
- Scinax staufferi (LC)
- Smilisca baudinii (LC)
- Smilisca phaeota (LC)
- Smilisca puma (LC)
- Smilisca sila (LC)
- Smilisca sordida (LC)
- Tlalocohyla loquax (LC)
- Trachycephalus venulosus (LC)

=== Leptodactylidae ===
Order: Anura. Family: Leptodactylidae

- Engystomops pustulosus (LC)
- Leptodactylus fragilis (LC)
- Leptodactylus insularum
- Leptodactylus melanonotus (LC)
- Leptodactylus poecilochilus (LC)
- Leptodactylus savagei (LC)

=== Microhylidae ===
Order: Anura – Family: Microhylidae

- Hypopachus pictiventris LC
- Northern sheep frog Hypopachus variolosus LC
- Ctenophryne aterrima LC

=== Ranidae ===
Order: Anura – Family: Ranidae

- Forrer's grass frog Lithobates forreri LC
- Peralta frog Lithobates taylori LC
- Vaillant's frog Lithobates vaillanti LC
- Lithobates vibicarius EN
- Warszewitsch's frog Lithobates warszewitschii LC

=== Rhinophrynidae ===
Order: Anura – Family: Rhinophrynidae

- Mexican burrowing toad Rhinophrynus dorsalis LC

=== Strabomantidae ===
Order: Anura. Family: Strabomantidae

- Pristimantis altae (NT)
- Pristimantis caryophyllaceus (NT)
- Pristimantis cerasinus (LC)
- Pristimantis cruentus (LC)
- Pristimantis gaigei (LC)
- Pristimantis moro (LC)
- Pristimantis pardalis (NT)
- Pristimantis ridens (LC)
- Pristimantis taeniatus (LC)
- Strabomantis bufoniformis (LC)

== See also ==
- List of birds of Costa Rica
- List of mammals of Costa Rica
- List of non-marine molluscs of Costa Rica
- List of reptiles of Costa Rica
