= List of amphibians of Nicaragua =

This is a list of amphibians found in Nicaragua. 71 amphibian species have been registered in Nicaragua, grouped in 2 orders: Salamanders (Caudata) and Frogs and Toads (Anura). This list is derived from the database listing of AmphibiaWeb.

== Salamanders (Caudata) ==
=== Plethodontidae ===
Order: Caudata. Family: Plethodontidae

- Bolitoglossa doefleini
- Bolitoglossa insularis
- Bolitoglossa mombachoensis (VU)
- Bolitoglossa striatula (LC)
- Nototriton saslaya (VU)
- Oedipina collaris (DD)
- Oedipina cyclocauda (LC)
- Oedipina koehleri
- Oedipina nica
- Oedipina pseudouniformis (EN)

== Toads and frogs (Anura) ==
=== Bufonidae ===
Order: Anura. Family: Bufonidae

- Incilius coccifer (LC)
- Incilius coniferus (LC)
- Incilius luetkenii (LC)
- Rhaebo haematiticus (LC)
- Rhinella marina (LC)

=== Centrolenidae ===
Order: Anura. Family: Centrolenidae

- Cochranella granulosa (LC)
- Espadarana prosoblepon (LC)
- Hyalinobatrachium fleischmanni (LC)
- Sachatamia ilex (LC)
- Teratohyla pulverata (LC)
- Teratohyla spinosa (LC)

=== Craugastoridae ===
Order: Anura. Family: Craugastoridae

- Craugastor bransfordii (LC)
- Craugastor chingopetaca (DD)
- Craugastor fitzingeri (LC)
- Craugastor laevissimus (EN)
- Craugastor lauraster (EN)
- Craugastor megacephalus (LC)
- Craugastor mimus (LC)
- Craugastor noblei (LC)
- Craugastor polyptychus (LC)
- Craugastor ranoides (CR)
- Craugastor talamancae (LC)

=== Dendrobatidae ===
Order: Anura. Family: Dendrobatidae

- Dendrobates auratus (LC)
- Oophaga pumilio (LC)

=== Dermophiidae ===
Order: Anura. Family: Dermophiidae

- Dermophis mexicanus (VU)
- Gymnopis multiplicata (LC)

=== Eleutherodactylidae ===
Order: Anura. Family: Eleutherodactylidae

- Diasporus diastema (LC)

=== Hylidae ===
Order: Anura. Family: Hylidae

- Agalychnis callidryas (LC)
- Agalychnis saltator (LC)
- Cruziohyla calcarifer (LC)
- Dendropsophus ebraccatus (LC)
- Dendropsophus microcephalus (LC)
- Dendropsophus phlebodes (LC)
- Ecnomiohyla miliaria (VU)
- Hypsiboas rufitelus (LC)
- Ptychohyla hypomykter (CR)
- Ptychohyla spinipollex (EN)
- Scinax boulengeri (LC)
- Scinax elaeochroa (LC)
- Scinax staufferi (LC)
- Smilisca baudinii (LC)
- Smilisca phaeota (LC)
- Smilisca puma (LC)
- Smilisca sordida (LC)
- Tlalocohyla loquax (LC)
- Trachycephalus venulosus (LC)

=== Leptodactylidae ===
Order: Anura. Family: Leptodactylidae

- Engystomops pustulosus (LC)
- Leptodactylus fragilis (LC)
- Leptodactylus melanonotus (LC)
- Leptodactylus savagei (LC)

=== Microhylidae ===
Order: Anura. Family: Microhylidae

- Gastrophryne pictiventris (LC)
- Hypopachus variolosus (LC)

=== Ranidae ===
Order: Anura. Family: Ranidae

- Rana berlandieri (LC)
- Rana forreri (LC)
- Rana maculata (LC)
- Rana miadis (VU)
- Rana taylori (LC)
- Rana vaillanti (LC)
- Rana warszewitschii (LC)

=== Rhinophrynidae ===
Order: Anura. Family: Rhinophrynidae

- Rhinophrynus dorsalis (LC)

=== Strabomantidae ===
Order: Anura. Family: Strabomantidae

- Pristimantis cerasinus (LC)
- Pristimantis ridens (LC)

== See also ==
- Fauna of Nicaragua
