= Oedipina pacificensis =

Conservation status
- Least Concern (IUCN 3.1)

Scientific classification
- Kingdom: Animalia
- Phylum: Chordata
- Class: Amphibia
- Order: Urodela
- Family: Plethodontidae
- Genus: Oedipina
- Species: O. pacificensis

Binomial name
- Oedipina pacificensis Taylor, 1952

Synonyms
- Haptoglossa pressicauda Cope, 1893 – uncertain status

Species of salamander

Oedipina pacificensis is a species of worm salamander in the family Plethodontidae. It is found on the Pacific slope of southwestern Costa Rica and adjacent Panama. it is morphologically indistinguishable from O. gracilis and O. uniformis, but is genetically clearly distinct.

== Description ==
Adult males measure 26–48 mm (1.0–1.9 in) and adult females 39–51 mm (1.5–2.0 in) in snout–vent length. The tail is longer than the body, such that adults have a total length of 108–175 mm (4.3–6.9 in). The body is very slender and elongate, with short limbs and tiny hands and feet; the digits are syndactylous (fused together). The head is moderately broad with bluntly rounded snout. There are 19–20 costal grooves. Coloration is grayish-black, often with a whitish area near limb insertions or joints. There are also white post-ocular stripes.

== Habitat and conservation ==
Oedipina pacificensis is a leaf-litter inhabitant that is often found near tree buttresses. It occurs in lowland moist and wet forests and premontane rainforest at elevations of 5–1,200 m (16–3,937 ft) above sea level. Development is direct (i.e., there is no free-living larval stage). It is a common species that can adapt to disturbed habitats. It is facing no major threats. It occurs in a number of protected areas in Costa Rica.
