= Oedipina petiola =

Conservation status
- Critically endangered, possibly extinct (IUCN 3.1)

Scientific classification
- Kingdom: Animalia
- Phylum: Chordata
- Class: Amphibia
- Order: Urodela
- Family: Plethodontidae
- Genus: Oedipina
- Species: O. petiola

Binomial name
- Oedipina petiola McCranie & Townsend, 2011

Species of amphibian

Oedipina petiola is a species of salamander endemic to Honduras. It is only known from a single specimen, hasn't been seen since 1995, and is possibly extinct.

== Taxonomy ==
Oedipina petiola was described in 2011, and is considered a sister taxon to Oedipina gephyra. Its specific epithet, petiola, comes from Latin word petiolus, meaning diminutive foot, referring to species' small, narrow feet.

== Description ==
Oedipina petiola is a moderately sized member of its genus, with the holotype being 42 cm long. Its dorsal side is jet black in coloration, while its ventral side is slightly paler. It is distinguished from closely related species by its lack of pale markings on its head, its smaller number of coastal grooves, and its characteristic small, narrow feet.

== Habitat and distribution ==
The species is known only from its type locality, Pico Bonito National Park in Honduras. It is believed to be endemic to the park. The single known specimen was collected from under a log in a primary broadleaf cloud forest.

== History and conservation ==
The only known specimen of Oedipina petiola was collected on February 18, 1995. Multiple amphibian surveys at the site since them have failed to find any more specimens and in 2019, the IUCN listed it as Critically Endangered and possibly extinct. It is believed to be threatened by disease, and habitat loss. Research has shown that the cloud forests these salamanders inhabit are at an increased risk of being negatively impacted by climate change. Additionally, their type locality is known to be susceptible to landslides.
