= O. longicauda =

O. longicauda may refer to:

- Oedipina longicauda (a salamander)
- Opistophthalmus longicauda (a scorpion)
- Oxyurichthys longicauda (a Goby fish)
