= Oedipina parvipes =

Conservation status
- Least Concern (IUCN 3.1)

Scientific classification
- Kingdom: Animalia
- Phylum: Chordata
- Class: Amphibia
- Order: Urodela
- Family: Plethodontidae
- Genus: Oedipina
- Species: O. parvipes

Binomial name
- Oedipina parvipes (Peters, 1879)

Synonyms
- Spelerpes (Oedipus) parvipes Peters, 1879

Species of amphibian

Oedipina parvipes, commonly known as the Colombian worm salamander, is a species of salamander in the family Plethodontidae. It is found in western Colombia and north-western Ecuador. Its type locality is Cáceres, Antioquia. It may occur further north to Panama and Costa Rica, but these records require confirmation as the species is morphologically indistinguishable from Costa Rican Oedipina uniformis. Its natural habitat is humid lowland forest, wherein it lives in leaf-litter.
