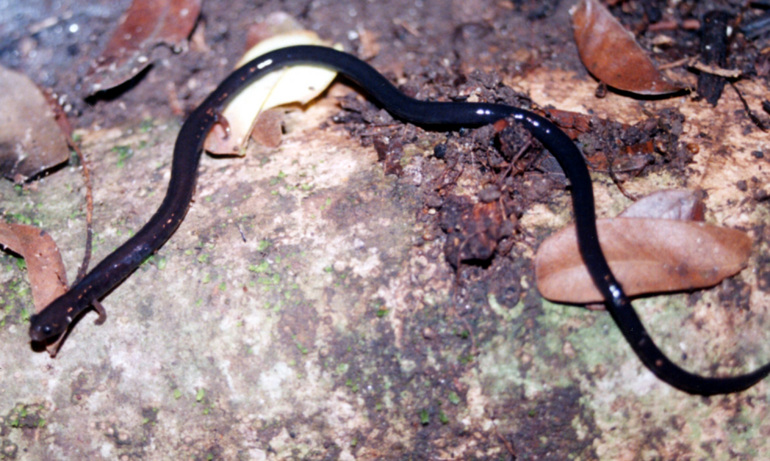

Conservation status
- Endangered (IUCN 3.1)

Scientific classification
- Kingdom: Animalia
- Phylum: Chordata
- Class: Amphibia
- Order: Urodela
- Family: Plethodontidae
- Genus: Oedipina
- Species: O. taylori

Binomial name
- Oedipina taylori Stuart, 1952

= Oedipina taylori =

Species of amphibian

Oedipina taylori, commonly known as Taylor's worm salamander, is a species of salamander in the family Plethodontidae. It is found on the Pacific versant in south-eastern Guatemala, to central to north-eastern El Salvador and adjacent southern Honduras. Honduran populations might represent another species.

== Etymology ==
The specific name taylori honors Edward Harrison Taylor (1889–1978), an American herpetologist.

== Description ==
Oedipina taylori was described by Laurence Cooper Stuart in 1952 based on a single specimen. This specimen—the holotype—is an adult male that measured 55 mm (2.2 in) in snout–vent length (SVL). Its tail is incomplete but is presumed to have been several times the SVL. The limbs are short, with partially webbed hands and feet. The coloration is gun-metal blue. It resembles Oedipina alfaroi but it has less webbing in the digits and a reduced number of vomerine teeth.

== Habitat and conservation ==
Its natural habitats probably are lowland and mid-altitude forests, but it has also been found in many man-made habitats, e.g., in the rubble of a collapsed shack and on a patio in a small town. The holotype was found underneath a rotting log in an open forest. It has been recorded at elevations of 140–1,140 m (460–3,740 ft) above sea level. It appears to tolerate some degree of habitat change and loss.
