= O. uniformis =

O. uniformis may refer to:

- Oedipina uniformis, a salamander species found in Costa Rica and possibly Panama
- Ophiacodon uniformis, a large pelycosaur fossil species found in Joggins, Nova Scotia and Canada

== See also ==
- Uniformis
