= Oedipina stuarti =

Conservation status
- Data Deficient (IUCN 3.1)

Scientific classification
- Kingdom: Animalia
- Phylum: Chordata
- Class: Amphibia
- Order: Urodela
- Family: Plethodontidae
- Genus: Oedipina
- Species: O. stuarti

Binomial name
- Oedipina stuarti Brame, 1968

Species of amphibian

Oedipina stuarti, commonly known as Stuart's worm salamander, is a species of salamander in the family Plethodontidae. It is endemic to Honduras.

Its natural habitats are tropical dry forests, subterranean habitats (other than caves), and man-made karsts.

== Sources ==
- Cruz, G., Wilson, L.D. & McCranie, R. 2004. Oedipina stuarti. 2006 IUCN Red List of Threatened Species. Downloaded on 23 July 2007.
