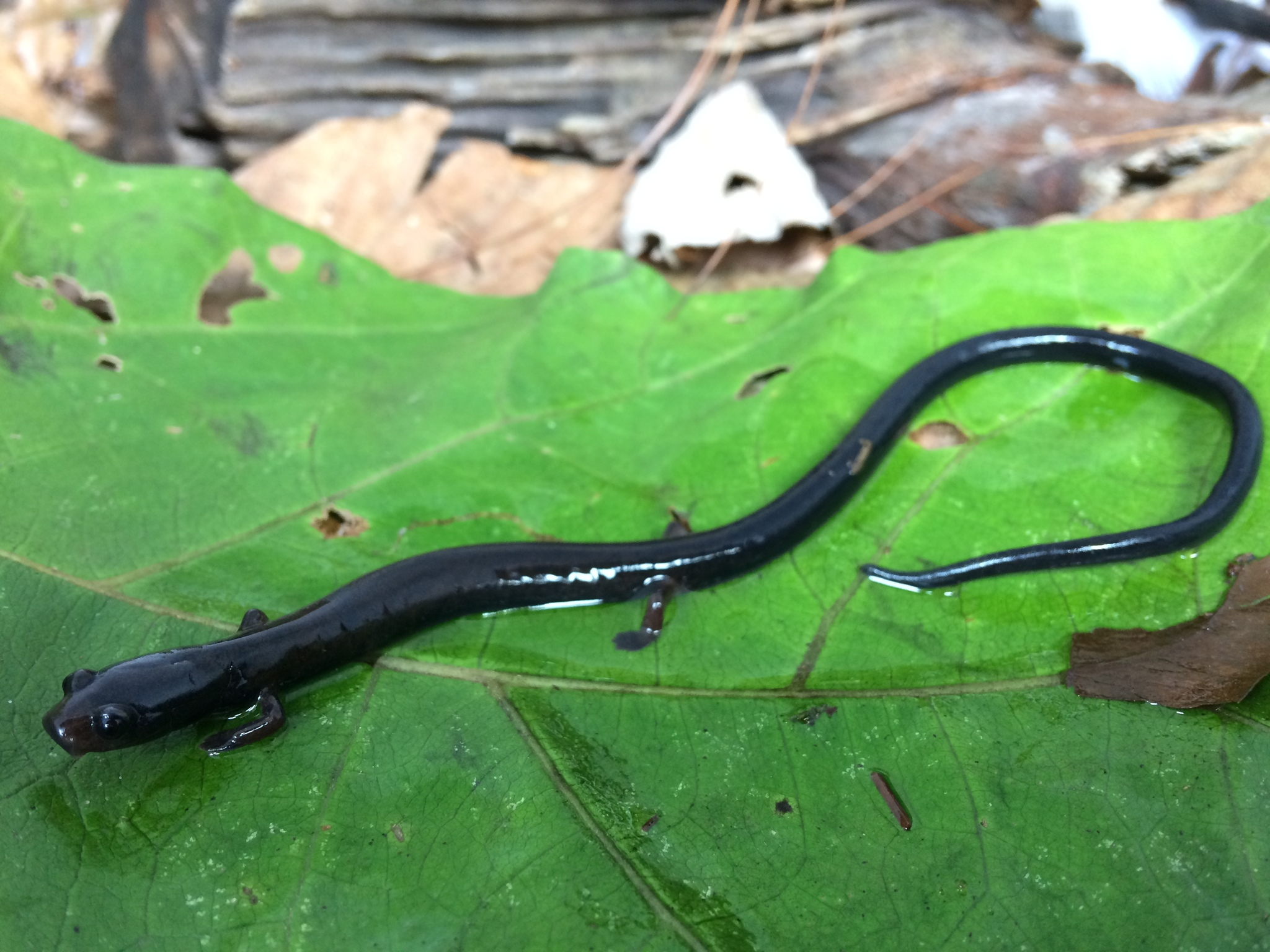
- Oedipina tomasi in Honduras

Conservation status
- Critically Endangered (IUCN 3.1)

Scientific classification
- Kingdom: Animalia
- Phylum: Chordata
- Class: Amphibia
- Order: Urodela
- Family: Plethodontidae
- Genus: Oedipina
- Species: O. tomasi

Binomial name
- Oedipina tomasi McCranie, 2006

= Oedipina tomasi =

Species of amphibian

Oedipina tomasi is a small, lungless salamander in the family Plethodontidae. This critically endangered amphibian has only ever been observed in the Cusuco National Park in Honduras. Very few specimens have been observed in the wild.

== Etymology ==
The specific name tomasi honors JR McCranie's assistant Tomas, who was instrumental during the lengthy expedition that led to this species' discovery.

== Description ==
This species description is based on one male holotype and one female paratype, which suggest sexual dimorphism of body size, with males being smaller than females, despite the low sample size. Oedipina tomasi have dark black bodies with small, pale flecks along their backs, and have a snout to vent length of 57.5 millimeters.

== Habitat and conservation ==
This salamander has only been observed between 1780 and 1800 meters above sea level, in the wet sand on the banks of the Cusuco River in the Cusuco National Park. Loss of genetic diversity due to low population size and deforestation pose the largest threats to this species.
