= Oedipina complex =

Conservation status
- Least Concern (IUCN 3.1)

Scientific classification
- Kingdom: Animalia
- Phylum: Chordata
- Class: Amphibia
- Order: Urodela
- Family: Plethodontidae
- Genus: Oedipina
- Species: O. complex

Binomial name
- Oedipina complex (Dunn, 1924)

Synonyms
- Oedipus complex Dunn, 1924

Species of amphibian

Oedipina complex, commonly known as the Gamboa worm salamander, is a species of salamander in the family Plethodontidae (lungless salamanders). The species is native to western South America from Costa Rica to western Colombia and north-western Ecuador.

== Habitat ==
The preferred natural habitat of Oedipina complex is humid tropical lowland forest, where it can be found on the ground, bushy vegetation, logs, and rocks. It can also be found on forest edges, but it does not survive in degraded areas.

== Conservation status ==
Oedipina complex is threatened by deforestation.

== Description ==
Oedipina complex is a small salamander, measuring 4.5 cm (1.8 in) in snout-to-vent length (SVL) and 12 cm (4.7 in) in total length (tail included).

== Behavior ==
When disturbed, Oedipina complex may play dead in order to confuse potential predators.
