= Oedipina savagei =

Conservation status
- Vulnerable (IUCN 3.1)

Scientific classification
- Kingdom: Animalia
- Phylum: Chordata
- Class: Amphibia
- Order: Urodela
- Family: Plethodontidae
- Genus: Oedipina
- Species: O. savagei

Binomial name
- Oedipina savagei García-París & Wake, 2000

Species of salamander

Oedipina savagei is a species of salamander in the family Plethodontidae. It is found in Costa Rica and Panama. Its natural habitat is subtropical or tropical moist montane forests. It is threatened by habitat loss.
