= Oedipina altura =

Conservation status
- Data Deficient (IUCN 3.1)

Scientific classification
- Kingdom: Animalia
- Phylum: Chordata
- Class: Amphibia
- Order: Urodela
- Family: Plethodontidae
- Genus: Oedipina
- Species: O. altura

Binomial name
- Oedipina altura Brame, 1968

Species of amphibian

Oedipina altura, commonly known as the Cartago worm salamander, is a species of salamander in the family Plethodontidae. The species is endemic to the Cordillera de Talamanca in Costa Rica.

== Habitat ==
The natural habitat of Oedipina altura is tropical moist montane forests.

== Conservation status ==
Oedipina altura is threatened by habitat loss.
