= Oedipina paucidentata =

Conservation status
- Data Deficient (IUCN 3.1)

Scientific classification
- Kingdom: Animalia
- Phylum: Chordata
- Class: Amphibia
- Order: Urodela
- Family: Plethodontidae
- Genus: Oedipina
- Species: O. paucidentata

Binomial name
- Oedipina paucidentata Brame, 1968

Species of amphibian

Oedipina paucidentata, commonly known as the El Empalme worm salamander, is a species of salamander in the family Plethodontidae. It is endemic to the Cordillera de Talamanca, Costa Rica.

Its natural habitat is tropical moist montane forests. It is threatened by habitat loss.
