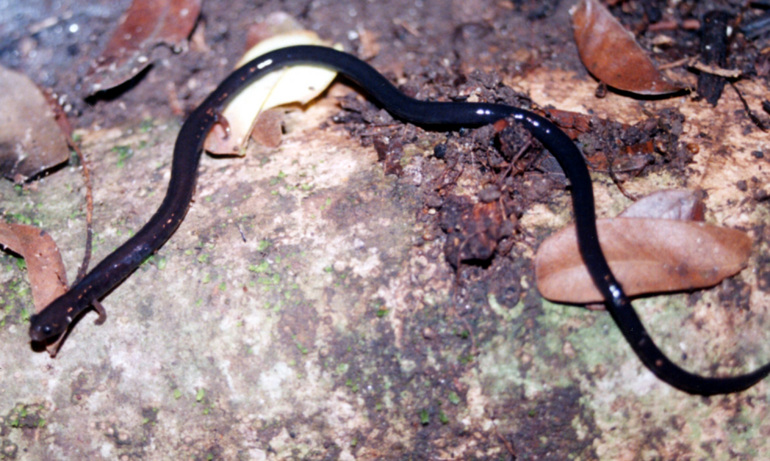
- Oedipina taylori

Scientific classification
- Kingdom: Animalia
- Phylum: Chordata
- Class: Amphibia
- Order: Urodela
- Family: Plethodontidae
- Subfamily: Hemidactyliinae
- Genus: Oedipina; Keferstein, 1868

Species
- See table.

= Oedipina =

Genus of salamanders

Oedipina is a genus of salamanders in the family Plethodontidae (lungless salamanders). They achieve respiration through the skin and the tissues lining the mouth. Species of Oedipina are native to Honduras, Colombia, Costa Rica, Ecuador, El Salvador, and Mexico. Their common name, worm salamanders, derives from the species' extraordinarily slender form with tiny limbs and digits. The genus was originally named Oedipus, but was renamed because the name Oedipus was already occupied.

== Species ==
This genus includes the following 40 species:

Binomial Name and Author	Common name
Oedipina alfaroi Dunn, 1921	Limon worm salamander
Oedipina alleni Taylor, 1954	Allen's worm salamander
Oedipina altura Brame, 1968	Cartago worm salamander
Oedipina berlini Kubicki, 2016	Berlin's flat-headed salamander
Oedipina capitalina Solís, Lemos-Espinal, Valle, O'Reilly, Itgen & Townsend, 2016	Cerro Grande worm salamander
Oedipina carablanca Brame, 1968	Los Diamantes worm salamander
Oedipina chortiorum Brodie, Acevedo & Campbell, 2012	Chorti worm salamander
Oedipina collaris (Stejneger, 1907)	collared worm salamander
Oedipina complex (Dunn, 1924)	Gamboa worm salamander
Oedipina cyclocauda Taylor, 1952	Costa Rican worm salamander
Oedipina ecuatoriana Reyes-Puig, Wake, Kotharambath, Streicher, Koch, Cisneros-Heredia, Yánez-Muñoz & Ron, 2020	Ecuadorian worm salamander
Oedipina elongata (Schmidt, 1936)	white-crowned worm salamander
Oedipina fortunensis Köhler, Ponce & Batista, 2007	Gustavo worm salamander
Oedipina gephyra McCranie, Wilson & K. Williams, 1993	La Fortuna worm salamander
Oedipina gracilis Taylor, 1952	slender worm salamander
Oedipina grandis Brame & Duellman, 1970	Cerro Pando worm salamander
Oedipina ignea Stuart, 1952	Chimaltenango worm salamander
Oedipina kasios McCranie, Vieites & Wake, 2008	Muralla worm salamander
Oedipina koehleri Sunyer, Townsend, Wake, Travers, Gonzalez, Obando & Quintana, 2011
Oedipina leptopoda McCranie, Vieites & Wake, 2008	narrow-footed worm salamander
Oedipina maritima García-París & Wake, 2000	maritime worm salamander
Oedipina motaguae Brodie, Acevedo & Campbell, 2012	Motagua worm salamander
Oedipina nica Sunyer & Wake, 2010	Nicaraguan worm salamander
Oedipina nimaso Boza-Oviedo, Rovito, Chaves, García-Rodríguez, Artavia, Bolaños & Wake, 2012	Nimaso worm salamander
Oedipina pacificensis Taylor, 1952	Pacific worm salamander
Oedipina parvipes (W. Peters, 1879)	Columbian worm salamander
Oedipina paucidentata Brame, 1968	El Empalme worm salamander
Oedipina petiola McCranie & Townsend, 2011
Oedipina poelzi Brame, 1963	quarry worm salamander
Oedipina pseudouniformis Brame, 1968	false Cienega Colorado worm salamander
Oedipina quadra McCranie, Vieites & Wake, 2008	Honduran lowland worm salamander
Oedipina salvadorensis Rand, 1952
Oedipina savagei García-París & Wake, 2000	Savage's worm salamander
Oedipina stenopodia Brodie & Campbell, 1993	narrow-footed worm salamander
Oedipina stuarti Brame, 1968	Stuart's worm salamander
Oedipina taylori Stuart, 1952	Taylor's worm salamander
Oedipina tomasi McCranie, 2006	Tomas' worm salamander
Oedipina tzutujilorum Brodie, Acevedo & Campbell, 2012	Tzutujil worm salamander
Oedipina uniformis Keferstein, 1868	Cienega Colorado worm salamander
Oedipina villamizariorum Reyes-Puig, Wake, Kotharambath, Streicher, Koch, Cisneros-Heredia, Yánez-Muñoz & Ron, 2020	Villamizar's worm salamander
