= Oedipina poelzi =

Conservation status
- Endangered (IUCN 3.1)

Scientific classification
- Kingdom: Animalia
- Phylum: Chordata
- Class: Amphibia
- Order: Urodela
- Family: Plethodontidae
- Genus: Oedipina
- Species: O. poelzi

Binomial name
- Oedipina poelzi Brame, 1963

Species of amphibian

Oedipina poelzi, commonly known as the quarry worm salamander, is a species of salamander in the family Plethodontidae. The species is endemic to Costa Rica.

== Etymology ==
The specific name, poelzi, is in honor of Friedrich Pölz of Radbruch, Germany, who was a friend of Brame.

== Geographic range ==
Oedipiana poelzi is found in the Cordillera de Tilarán, the Cordillera Central, and the Cordillera de Talamanca of Costa Rica.

== Habitat ==
The natural habitats of Oedipina poelzi are tropical moist montane forests, rivers, and heavily degraded former forest.

== Conservation status ==
Oedipina poelzi is threatened by habitat loss.
