= Oedipina carablanca =

Conservation status
- Endangered (IUCN 3.1)

Scientific classification
- Kingdom: Animalia
- Phylum: Chordata
- Class: Amphibia
- Order: Urodela
- Family: Plethodontidae
- Genus: Oedipina
- Species: O. carablanca

Binomial name
- Oedipina carablanca Brame, 1968

Species of amphibian

Oedipina carablanca, commonly known as the Los Diamantes worm salamander, is a species of salamander in the family Plethodontidae. The species is endemic to Costa Rica and is only known from its type locality, Los Diamantes, near Guápiles, Limón Province.

== Habitat ==
The natural habitats of Oedipina carablanca are tropical moist lowland forests, plantations, rural gardens, and heavily degraded former forest.

== Conservation status ==
Oedipina carablanca is threatened by habitat loss.
