= Oedipina alleni =

Conservation status
- Least Concern (IUCN 3.1)

Scientific classification
- Kingdom: Animalia
- Phylum: Chordata
- Class: Amphibia
- Order: Urodela
- Family: Plethodontidae
- Genus: Oedipina
- Species: O. alleni

Binomial name
- Oedipina alleni Taylor, 1954

Species of salamander

Oedipina alleni, commonly known as Allen's worm salamander, is a species of salamander in the family Plethodontidae. The species is native to Central America.

== Etymology ==
The specific name, alleni, is in honor of American botanist Paul Hamilton Allen (1911–1963).

== Geographic range ==
Oedipina alleni is found in Costa Rica and Panama.

== Habitat ==
The natural habitats of Oedipina alleni are subtropical or tropical moist lowland forests, plantations, rural gardens, and heavily degraded former forest.

== Conservation status ==
Oedipina alleni is threatened by habitat loss.
