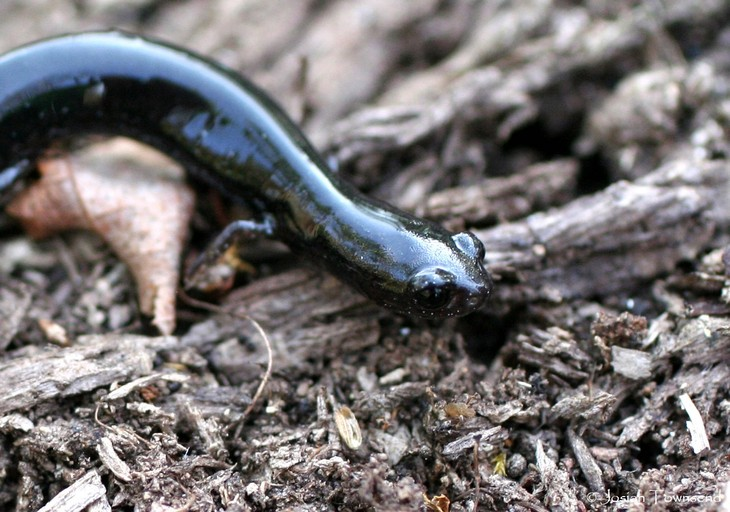

Conservation status
- Critically Endangered (IUCN 3.1)

Scientific classification
- Kingdom: Animalia
- Phylum: Chordata
- Class: Amphibia
- Order: Urodela
- Family: Plethodontidae
- Genus: Oedipina
- Species: O. gephyra

Binomial name
- Oedipina gephyra McCranie, Wilson & Williams, 1993

= Oedipina gephyra =

Species of amphibian

Oedipina gephyra, commonly known as the La Fortuna worm salamander, is a species of salamander in the family Plethodontidae. It is endemic to Honduras.

Its natural habitat is subtropical or tropical moist montane forests. It is threatened by habitat loss.
