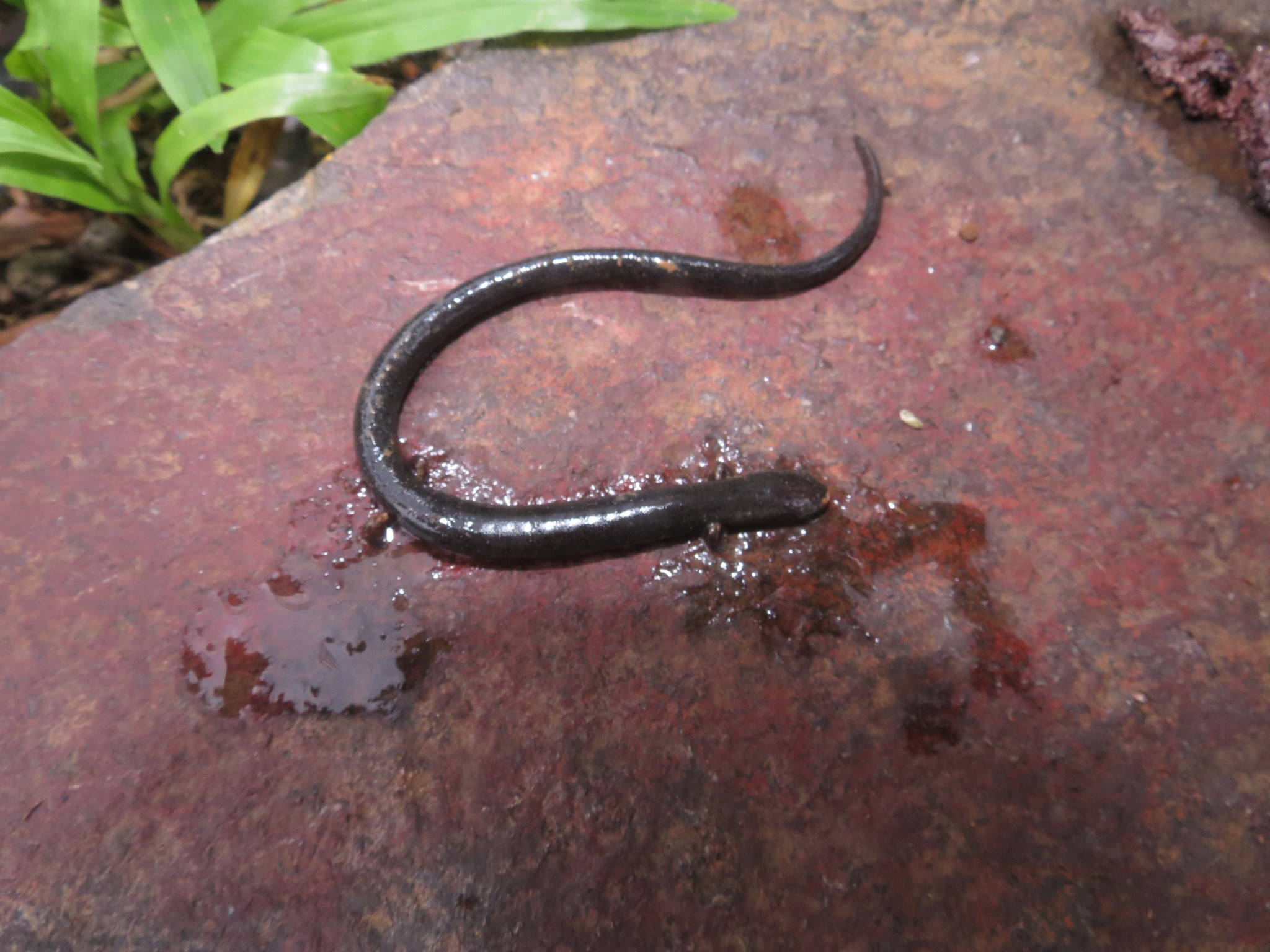

Conservation status
- Near Threatened (IUCN 3.1)

Scientific classification
- Kingdom: Animalia
- Phylum: Chordata
- Class: Amphibia
- Order: Urodela
- Family: Plethodontidae
- Genus: Oedipina
- Species: O. cyclocauda

Binomial name
- Oedipina cyclocauda Taylor, 1952

= Oedipina cyclocauda =

Species of amphibian

Oedipina cyclocauda, commonly known as the Costa Rica worm salamander, is a species of salamander in the family Plethodontidae. It is found on the Caribbean slopes of northwestern Panama, eastern Costa Rica, Nicaragua, and northern Honduras. The specific name cyclocauda refers to the circular caudal grooves.

== Description ==
Adult males measure 41–45 mm (1.6–1.8 in) and adult females 42–46 mm (1.7–1.8 in) in snout–vent length; the tail is approximately twice as long as the body (range 1.9–2.2). The snout is somewhat pointed. The eyes are small. The body and the tail are mostly cylindrical; much of the tail is only slightly narrower than the body. There are 19 costal grooves and about 56 to 70 caudal grooves. There are four fingers and five toes that are fused together; no more than one third of any digit is free. Skin is smooth. Dorsal and lateral coloration is grayish slate, turning slightly brownish in the distal half of the tail.

== Habitat and conservation ==
Oedipina cyclocauda occurs in humid lowland forests at elevations generally below 600 m (2,000 ft); Honduran records from elevations up to 1,780 m (5,840 ft) might refer to another species. It is terrestrial and semi-fossorial. The type series was collected from rotting logs in which they appeared to follow tunnels made by beetle larvae (a microhabitat shared with Oedipina gracilis) and from piles of rotting weeds or stumps. Development is direct, without free-living larval stage.

Oedipina cyclocauda is widely spread but uncommon, except in Honduras where it is fairly common. It is threatened by the loss of trees caused by expansion of agriculture and human settlements, as well as logging; loss of trees causes drying of the soil. It is presumably present in some protected areas.
