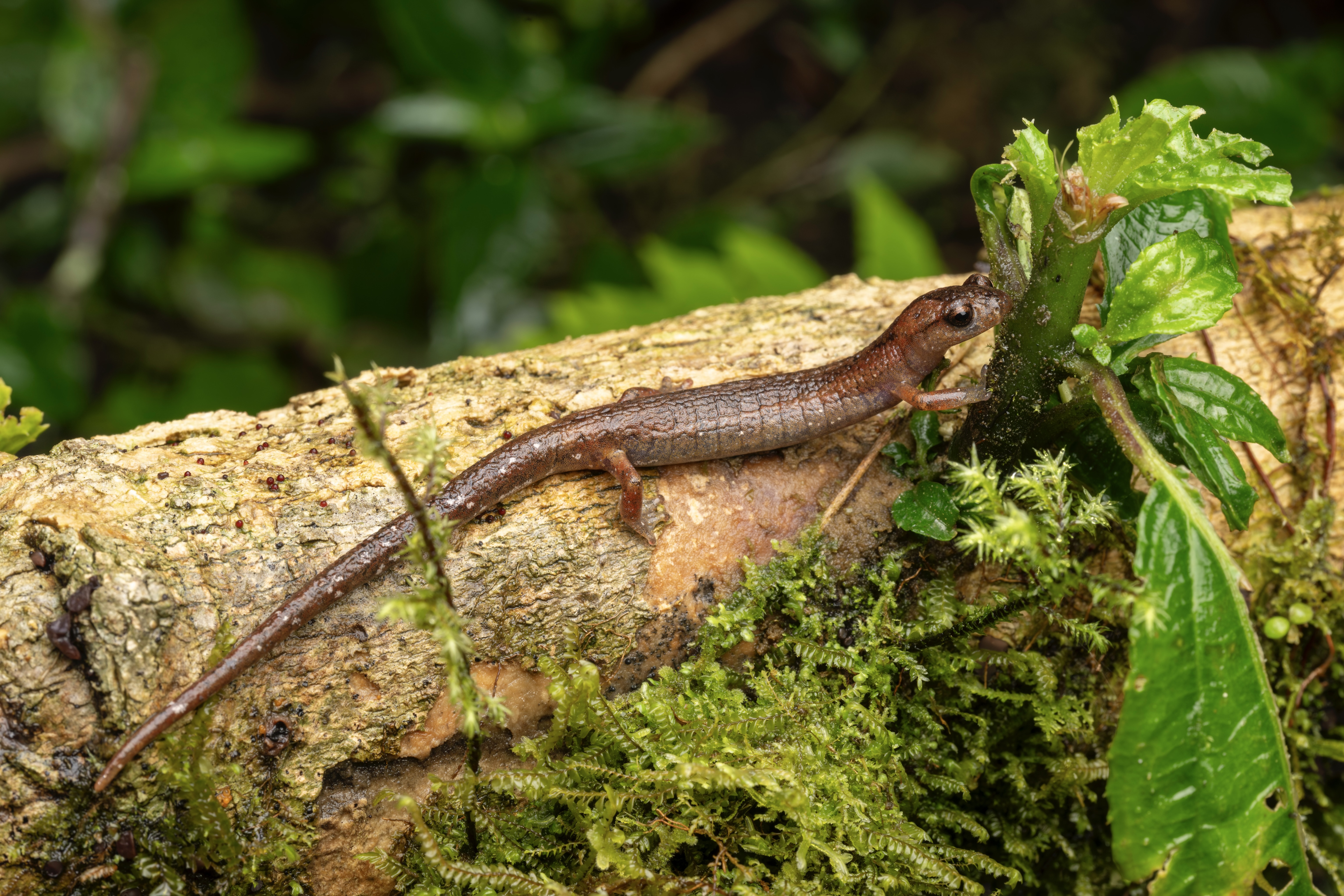

Conservation status
- Data Deficient (IUCN 3.1)

Scientific classification
- Kingdom: Animalia
- Phylum: Chordata
- Class: Amphibia
- Order: Urodela
- Family: Plethodontidae
- Genus: Bolitoglossa
- Species: B. tica

Binomial name
- Bolitoglossa tica García-París, Parra-Olea and Wake, 2008

= Tico salamander =

Species of amphibian

The Tico salamander (Bolitoglossa tica) is a species of salamander in the family Plethodontidae. Formally described in 2008, it is named after the word tico, a nickname for the people of Costa Rica. It is a moderately-sized, slender, and large-headed species with long limbs. It is mostly reddish-brown, with a darker tail, dark black underside, and pale tan snout. It is endemic to central Costa Rica, where it has been recorded in the Cordillera de Talamanca and Cerros de Escazú. It inhabits montane rainforest and subtropical cloud forest. It is classified as being data-deficient on the IUCN Red List due to a lack of sufficient information on its population, distribution, and ecology.

== Taxonomy ==
The Tico salamander was formally described in 2008 based on an adult male specimen collected from Cartago Province in Costa Rica. It is named after "the Costa Rican people", who are nicknamed "ticos", to honor their dedication to conservation.

== Description ==
The Tico salamander is a moderately-sized, slender, and large-headed species with long limbs. The standard length ranges from 37.7 to 59.7 mm in males and 41.3 to 53.9 in females. The long and thin tails are generally longer than the body. The dorsum is mostly reddish-brown, while the tail is darker. There is a brownish-red stripe along middle of the back that starts at the shoulder and ends at the middle of the body. The snout and pre-ocular region are pale tan with a gold-grey iris. The underside of the body is dark black, with a slightly lighter throat. There are white speckles focussed around the pelvis. Larger specimens seem to be darker, with darker undersides flecked with small white patches and nearly blackish uppersides. Some specimens also have faint reddish-brown stripes from the shoulders to the middle of the body and gray-gold irises.

== Distribution and habitat ==
The Tico salamander is endemic to central Costa Rica, where it has been recorded in the Cordillera de Talamanca and Cerros de Escazú. In the northern slopes of the Cordillera de Talamanca, the salamander inhabits elevations of 2200–2500 m, while in the Cerros de Escazú, it is found lower down to 1745 m. The areas inhabited by the species get 1825–2300 mm of rain annually, with an average annual temperature of 12–15 ºC. The Tico salamander is rather arboreal, often being seen 15 cm to 3 m high on Lycopodiaceae ferns and other vegetation at night. It is also seen in bromeliads, under leaf litter, in stumps or rotting logs, and on road banks. The area where the holotype was collected in the Cordillera de Talamanca is a transition zone between lower montane rainforest and subtropical montane rainforest or subtropical cloud forest. The species is rather fast and energetic in its behavior.

== Conservation ==
The Tico salamander is classified as being data-deficient on the IUCN Red List due to a lack of sufficient information on its population, distribution, and ecology. All of the salamander's known populations exist within protected areas, namely the Cerros de Escazú protected zone, Tapantí National Park, and Cerro las Vueltas Biological Reserve. It may be threatened by salamander chytrid fungus.
