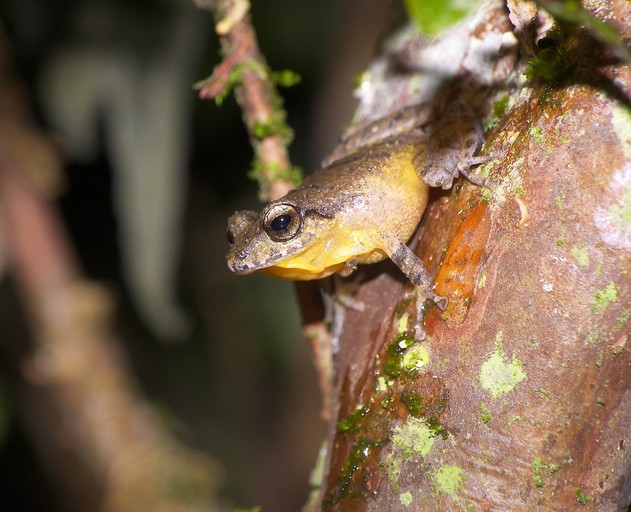

Conservation status
- Least Concern (IUCN 3.1)

Scientific classification
- Kingdom: Animalia
- Phylum: Chordata
- Class: Amphibia
- Order: Anura
- Family: Strabomantidae
- Genus: Pristimantis
- Species: P. taeniatus

Binomial name
- Pristimantis taeniatus (Boulenger, 1912)

Synonyms
- Hylodes taeniatus Boulenger, 1912; Eleutherodactylus taeniatus (Boulenger, 1912)

= Pristimantis taeniatus =

Species of frog

Pristimantis taeniatus is a species of frog in the family Strabomantidae. It is found in central Panama to Colombia (Pacific/Chocó and Andean natural region), possibly to north-western Ecuador. It is sometimes known as banded robber frog.

== Description ==
Male Pristimantis taeniatus measure 15–25 mm (0.59–0.98 in) and females 25–32 mm (0.98–1.26 in) in snout–vent length. Panamian frogs are on average larger than Colombian ones. Dorsum is brown with a variable pattern; the normal form (90% of individuals) has dark flecks and spots on its back, defining an occipital W-pattern. A striped form is much less common. Skin is smooth anteriorly but becomes shagreened posteriorly. There are small tubercles on upper eyelid, flanks, and lower back. Tympanum is distinct. There is no webbing between toes.

== Habitat and conservation ==
The natural habitats of Pristimantis taeniatus are primary and secondary forest humid lowland and montane forests. It tolerates habitat modification and also occurs in shady coffee plantations. It is an abundant species in Colombia. No significant threats to this species have been identified.
