= Craugastor fleischmanni =

Conservation status
- Critically Endangered (IUCN 3.1)

Scientific classification
- Kingdom: Animalia
- Phylum: Chordata
- Class: Amphibia
- Order: Anura
- Family: Craugastoridae
- Genus: Craugastor
- Species: C. fleischmanni

Binomial name
- Craugastor fleischmanni (Boettger, 1892)

Synonyms
- Hylodes fleischmanni Boettger, 1892; Lithodytes euryglossus Cope, 1894; Liohyla engytympanum Günther, 1900; Eleutherodactylus fleishmanni (Boettger, 1892)

Species of frog

Craugastor fleischmanni is a species of frog in the family Craugastoridae. It is endemic to Costa Rica where it has been found on the Meseta Central Oriental and Occidental, the Pacific slopes of the Barva and Poás Volcanos, the Atlantic slopes of the Irazú and Turrialba Volcanos, and on the Cordillera de Talamanca. Common name Fleischmann's robber frog has been suggested for this species.

== Etymology ==
The specific name fleischmanni honors Carl Fleischmann, a collector active in Costa Rica in the 1890s.

== Description ==
Males grow to 45 mm (1.8 in) and females to 72 mm (2.8 in) in snout–vent length. Adult males have vocal slits and nuptial pads.

== Habitat and conservation ==
Its natural habitats are premontane and lower montane wet forests at elevations of 1,050–2,286 m (3,445–7,500 ft) above sea level. It has been found along streams at both pristine and moderately disturbed sites. Reproduction takes place in stream margins; the development is direct (i.e., without free-living tadpole stage).

The species has declined in the late 20th century. After extensive searches in 1987–2009 when no specimen was found, a single individual was recorded from the headwaters of Rio Ciruelas in 2010. As of 2013, there are no further confirmed records. The reasons for this decline are unclear but both chytridiomycosis and climate change might have been at play. Historically it occurred in the Tapantí National Park and in other protected areas.
