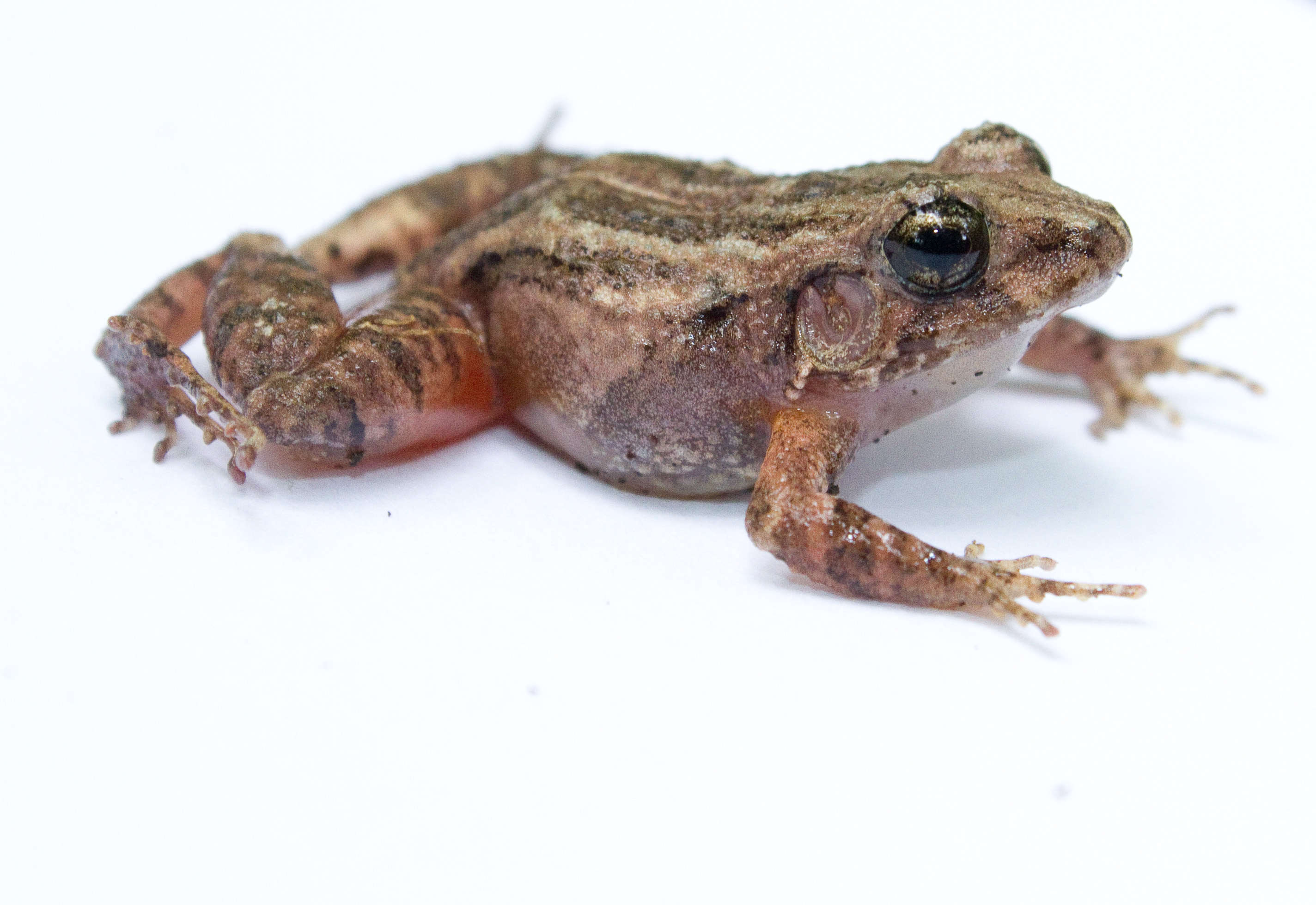

Conservation status
- Least Concern (IUCN 3.1)

Scientific classification
- Kingdom: Animalia
- Phylum: Chordata
- Class: Amphibia
- Order: Anura
- Family: Craugastoridae
- Genus: Craugastor
- Species: C. bransfordii

Binomial name
- Craugastor bransfordii (Cope, 1885)

= Craugastor bransfordii =

Species of frog

Craugastor bransfordii is a species of frog in the family Craugastoridae. It is found in Costa Rica, Nicaragua, and Panama. Its natural habitats are subtropical or tropical moist lowland forests and subtropical or tropical moist montane forests. It is threatened by habitat loss. Its conservation status in terms of IUCN (Red List) Status is Least Concern (LC).
