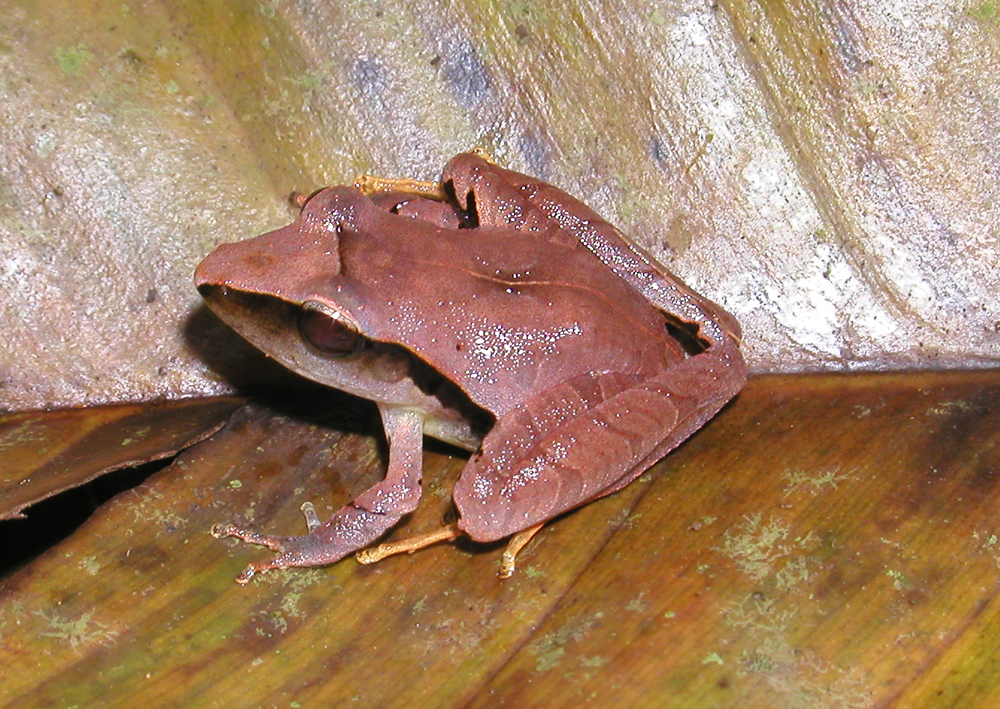

Conservation status
- Least Concern (IUCN 3.1)

Scientific classification
- Kingdom: Animalia
- Phylum: Chordata
- Class: Amphibia
- Order: Anura
- Family: Craugastoridae
- Genus: Craugastor
- Species: C. mimus

Binomial name
- Craugastor mimus (Taylor, 1955)

Synonyms
- Eleutherodactylus mimus Taylor, 1955

= Craugastor mimus =

Species of frog

Craugastor mimus is a species of frog in the family Craugastoridae. It is found in lowland and premontane forests on the Atlantic versant from eastern Honduras through eastern Nicaragua to central Costa Rica. Its natural habitat is lowland and premontane moist and wet forests. It is threatened by habitat loss.

Male Craugastor mimus grow up to 30 mm (1.2 in) and females to 55 mm (2.2 in) in snout–vent length.
