= Oedipina alfaroi =

Conservation status
- Vulnerable (IUCN 3.1)

Scientific classification
- Kingdom: Animalia
- Phylum: Chordata
- Class: Amphibia
- Order: Urodela
- Family: Plethodontidae
- Genus: Oedipina
- Species: O. alfaroi

Binomial name
- Oedipina alfaroi Dunn, 1921

Synonyms
- Oedipus alfaroi (Dunn, 1921)

Species of amphibian

Oedipina alfaroi is a species of salamander in the family Plethodontidae. It is found in the Caribbean versant of eastern Costa Rica (Limón Province) and northwestern Panama (Bocas del Toro Province). It is commonly known as the Limon worm salamander.

== Etymology ==
The specific name alfaroi honors Anastasio Alfaro (1865–1951) from the Museo Nacional de Costa Rica.

== Description ==
Oedipina alfaroi was described based on two specimens, adult females measuring 51 and 53 mm (2.0 and 2.1 in) in snout–vent length and 132 and 104 mm (5.2 and 4.1 in) in total length, respectively (the latter individual had injured tail, hence the lower total length). The head is pointed and the eyes are relatively small. Maxillary teeth are absent. Body is dark or purplish brown above and grayish below.

== Habitat and conservation ==
Its natural habitats are humid lowland forests at elevations of 20–850 m (66–2,789 ft) above sea level, but it can also occur in old banana plantations. It lives in the leaf litter. This uncommon species is threatened by habitat loss as it does not tolerate opening up of its forest habitat. It occurs in the Palo Seco Forest Reserve (Panama).
