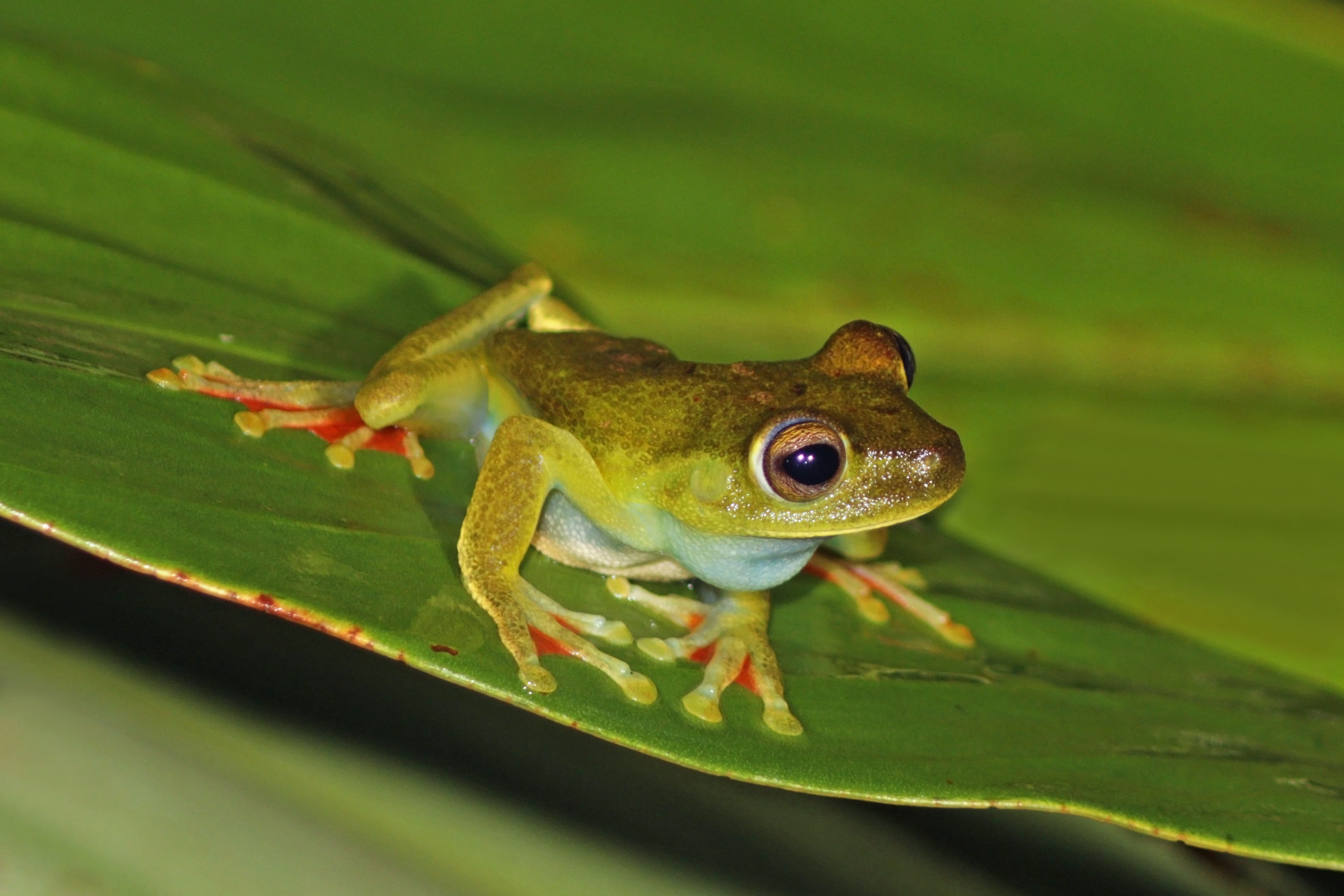

Conservation status
- Least Concern (IUCN 3.1)

Scientific classification
- Kingdom: Animalia
- Phylum: Chordata
- Class: Amphibia
- Order: Anura
- Family: Hylidae
- Genus: Boana
- Species: B. rufitela

Binomial name
- Boana rufitela (Fouquette, 1961)

Synonyms
- Hyla rufitela Fouquette, 1961; Hypsiboas rufitelus (Fouquette, 1961)

= Canal Zone tree frog =

Species of amphibian

The Canal Zone tree frog (Boana rufitela) is a species of frog in the family Hylidae found in the Caribbean lowlands of eastern Nicaragua, Costa Rica, and central Panama, as well as the Pacific lowlands of Colombia, although the latter records are uncertain and may refer to Boana rosenbergi.

== Description ==
Boana rufitela is a medium-sized tree frog. Males measure 39–44 mm (1.5–1.7 in) in snout–urostyle length and females 46–48 mm (1.8–1.9 in). It is green above, with profuse, tiny, dark punctations and usually scattered dark spots. Fingers are about one-half and toes three-fourths webbed. Males have a distinct pollex rudiment bearing a spine.

== Habitat ==
Its natural habitats are humid lowland forests. It tolerates some disturbance and can be found in open areas close to forest. Breeding takes place in swamps surrounded by trees. It is a locally common tree frog in the appropriate habitat.
