= Oedipina collaris =

Conservation status
- Data Deficient (IUCN 3.1)

Scientific classification
- Kingdom: Animalia
- Phylum: Chordata
- Class: Amphibia
- Order: Urodela
- Family: Plethodontidae
- Genus: Oedipina
- Species: O. collaris

Binomial name
- Oedipina collaris (Stejneger, 1907)

Synonyms
- Oedipina serpens Taylor, 1949

Species of salamander

Oedipina collaris is a species of salamander in the family Plethodontidae. It is found in Costa Rica, Nicaragua, and Panama. Its natural habitat is subtropical or tropical moist lowland forests. It is threatened by habitat loss.
