= Oedipina pseudouniformis =

Conservation status
- Data Deficient (IUCN 3.1)

Scientific classification
- Kingdom: Animalia
- Phylum: Chordata
- Class: Amphibia
- Order: Urodela
- Family: Plethodontidae
- Genus: Oedipina
- Species: O. pseudouniformis

Binomial name
- Oedipina pseudouniformis Brame, 1968

Species of salamander

Oedipina pseudouniformis is a species of salamander in the family Plethodontidae. It is found in Costa Rica and Nicaragua. Its natural habitats are subtropical or tropical moist lowland forests, subtropical or tropical moist montane forests, plantations, and heavily degraded former forest. It is threatened by habitat loss.
