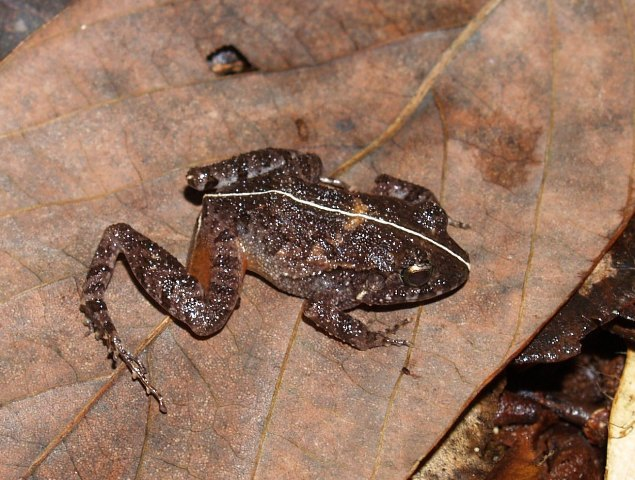

Conservation status
- Least Concern (IUCN 3.1)

Scientific classification
- Kingdom: Animalia
- Phylum: Chordata
- Class: Amphibia
- Order: Anura
- Family: Craugastoridae
- Genus: Craugastor
- Species: C. polyptychus

Binomial name
- Craugastor polyptychus (Cope, 1885)

= Craugastor polyptychus =

Species of frog

Craugastor polyptychus is a species of frog in the family Craugastoridae. It is found in Costa Rica, Nicaragua, and Panama. Its natural habitats are subtropical or tropical moist lowland forests, plantations, rural gardens, and heavily degraded former forest. It is threatened by habitat loss.
