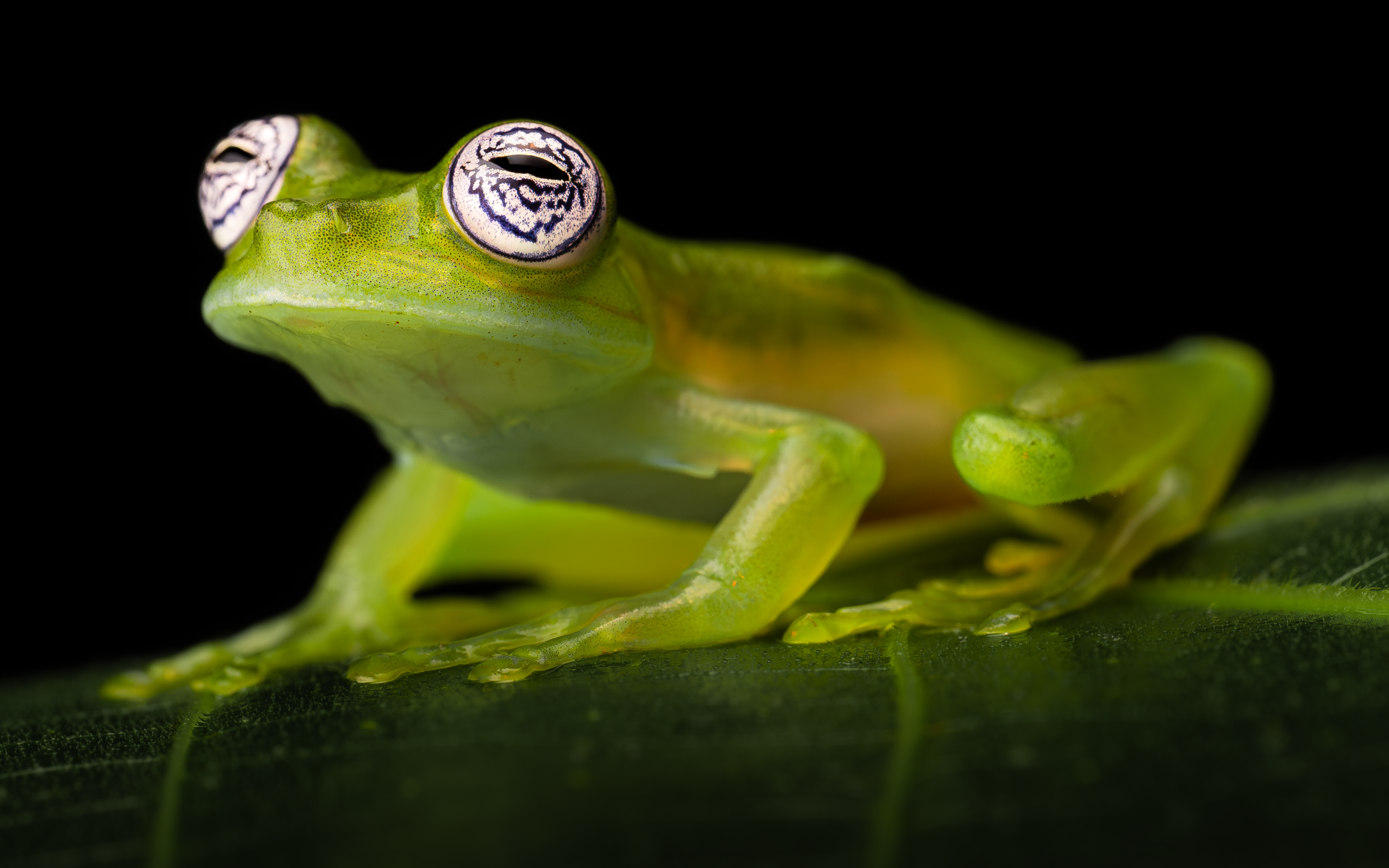

Conservation status
- Least Concern (IUCN 3.1)

Scientific classification
- Kingdom: Animalia
- Phylum: Chordata
- Class: Amphibia
- Order: Anura
- Family: Centrolenidae
- Genus: Sachatamia
- Species: S. ilex

Binomial name
- Sachatamia ilex (Savage, 1967)

Synonyms
- Centrolenella ilex Savage, 1967; Centrolene ilex (Savage, 1967)

= Sachatamia ilex =

Species of frog

Sachatamia ilex is a species of frog in the family Centrolenidae. It is found in eastern Nicaragua, Costa Rica, Panama, western Colombia (Pacific lowlands and the Pacific slopes of the Cordillera Occidental), and western Ecuador. The common name Limon giant glass frog has been coined for this species, apparently in reference to its type locality in the canton of Limón, Costa Rica, and it is also known as Holly's glassfrog and the ghost glass frog.

== Description ==
Adult males measure 27–29 mm (1.1–1.1 in) and females 28–34 mm (1.1–1.3 in) in snout–vent length. The snout is truncate in lateral view. Both fingers and toes have webbing and there are adhesive discs on the tips of the digits. The dorsal skin is shagreen. The dorsum is uniform dark green in color while the gular region and belly are creamy white. The iris is white or light gray with black reticulations.

This frog is active at night. In the day it crouches on the upper side of a leaf, adjusting its colour to match the background. The males call from the upper surfaces of the leaves near streams and may engage in fights. The eggs are black and are deposited on the upper surface of the leaves, and when they hatch, the larvae fall into the water below.

== Habitat and conservation ==
Its natural habitats are humid lowland and montane primary and secondary forests at elevations between 180 and 1,430 m (590 and 4,690 ft) above sea level. It is typically found within the splash zone of waterfalls and torrents, and in bushes and trees alongside forest streams, which is where it breeds. While habitat loss is a localized threat, it is not considered threatened as a species by the International Union for Conservation of Nature (IUCN).
