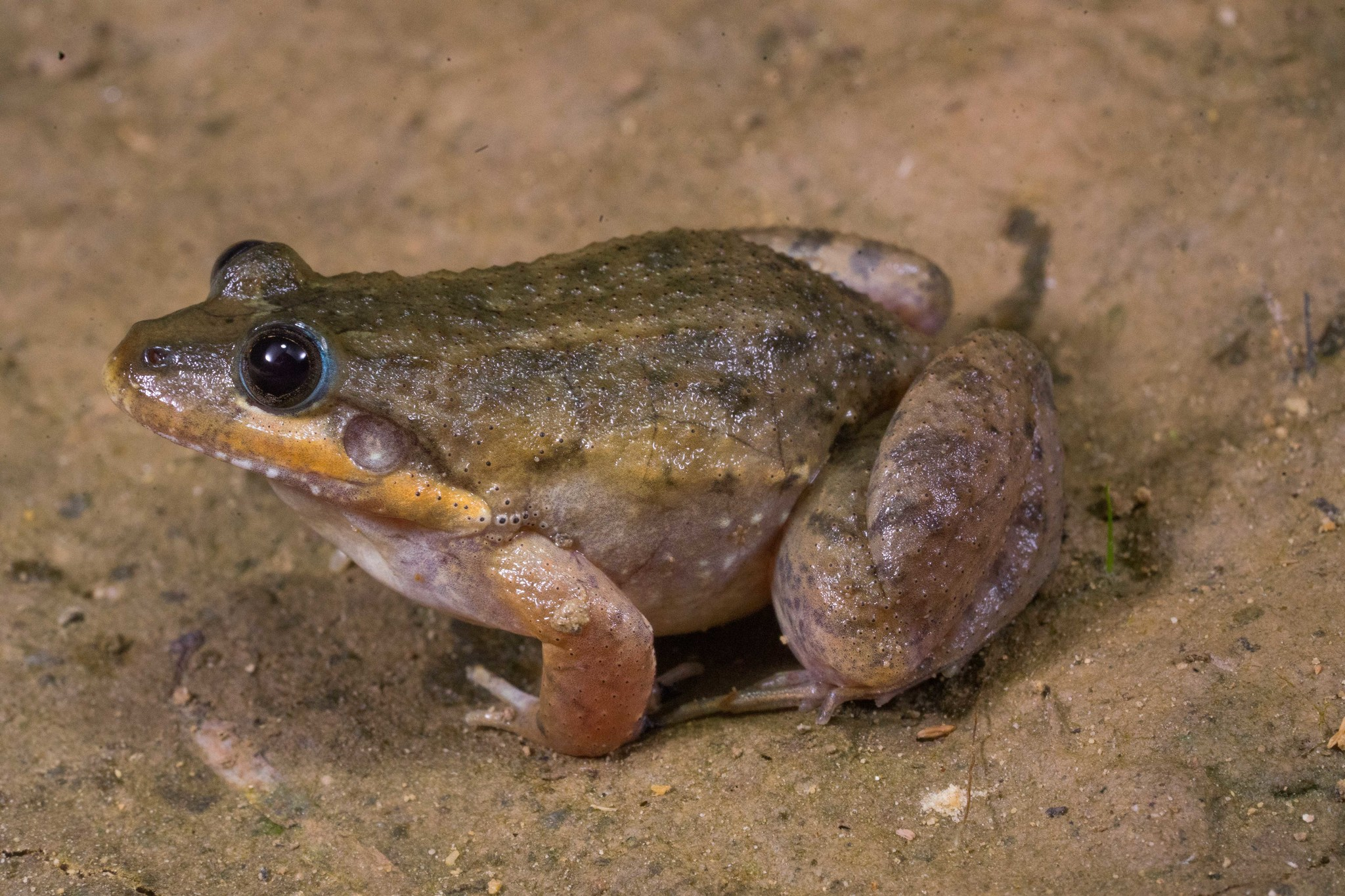
- In Oaxaca, Mexico

Conservation status
- Least Concern (IUCN 3.1)

Scientific classification
- Kingdom: Animalia
- Phylum: Chordata
- Class: Amphibia
- Order: Anura
- Family: Leptodactylidae
- Genus: Leptodactylus
- Species: L. melanonotus

Binomial name
- Leptodactylus melanonotus (Hallowell, 1861)

Synonyms
- Cystignathus melanonotus Hallowell, 1861 "1860"; Cystignathus echinatus Brocchi, 1877; Cystignathus microtis Cope, 1879; Cystignathus perlaevis Cope, 1879; Leptodactylus echinatus Brocchi, 1881; Leptodactylus melanonotus Brocchi, 1881; Leptodactylus microtis Boulenger, 1882; Leptodactylus perlaevis Boulenger, 1882; Leptodactylus occidentalis Taylor, 1937 "1936"

= Leptodactylus melanonotus =

Species of frog

Leptodactylus melanonotus, known commonly as the Sabinal Frog, is a species of frog in the family Leptodactylidae. It is found along coasts and in inland wetlands in Central America and northern South America.

== Taxonomy ==
The first description of the species was published in 1861 by Edward Hallowell, who placed it in the genus Cystignathus; a genus later determined to be a synonym of Leptodactylus, but Paul Brocchi had already moved melanonotus there in 1881, long before synonymization.

L. melanotus is part of a species group bearing its name, and its closest relatives are L. colombiensis, L. validus and L. wagneri.

== Description ==
Average snout–vent length is about 46 mm (1.8 in) in males and 50 mm (2.0 in) in females.

== Behaviour ==
L. melanotus digs burrows and builds nest out of bubbles for its eggs. If the burrow fails to flood or becomes too dry, the female frog will dig a channel to a nearby body of water.

It is a nocturnal species.

== Distribution and habitat ==
L. melanotus can be found in Mexico, along the west and east coasts and on the Yucatán Peninsula, Belize, Guatemala, Honduras, El Salvador, Nicaragua, including on Mancarroncito Island, Costa Rica, Panama and along the west coasts of Colombia and Ecuador.

L. melanotus mainly inhabits humid lowlands and montane forests, but can be found living in many other habitats, including mangrove forests and grasslands. It is also found in habitats disturbed by human activities, such as flooded pastures, secondary forests, farmlands and urban areas. It is known to live at elevations ranging from sea level to 1,550 m (5,090 ft).

The 2019 IUCN Red List assessment of L. melanotus deemed it to be a least-concern species. The only potential threat was deemed to be chemicals sprayed from airplanes.

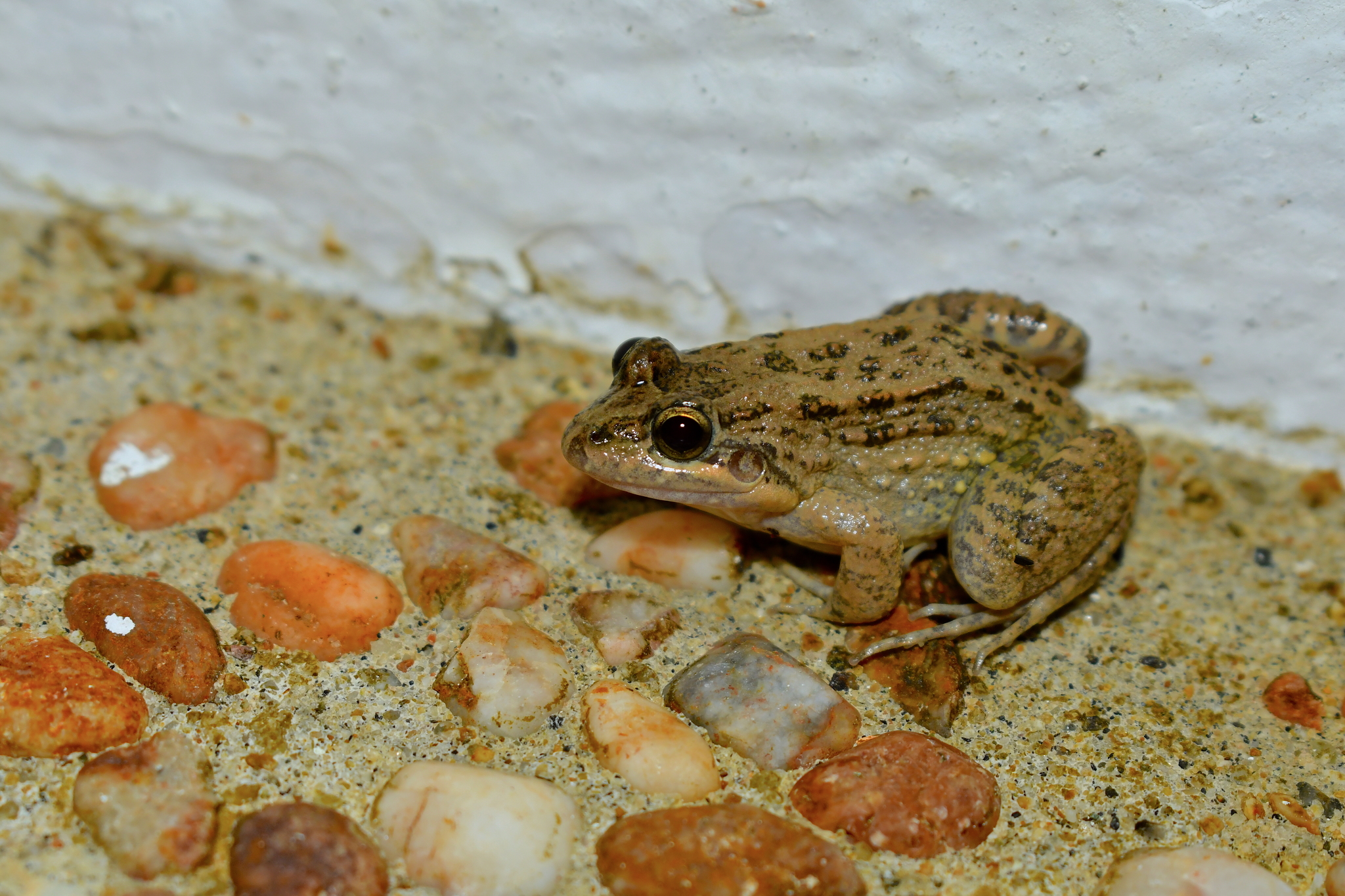
Chiapas, Mexico

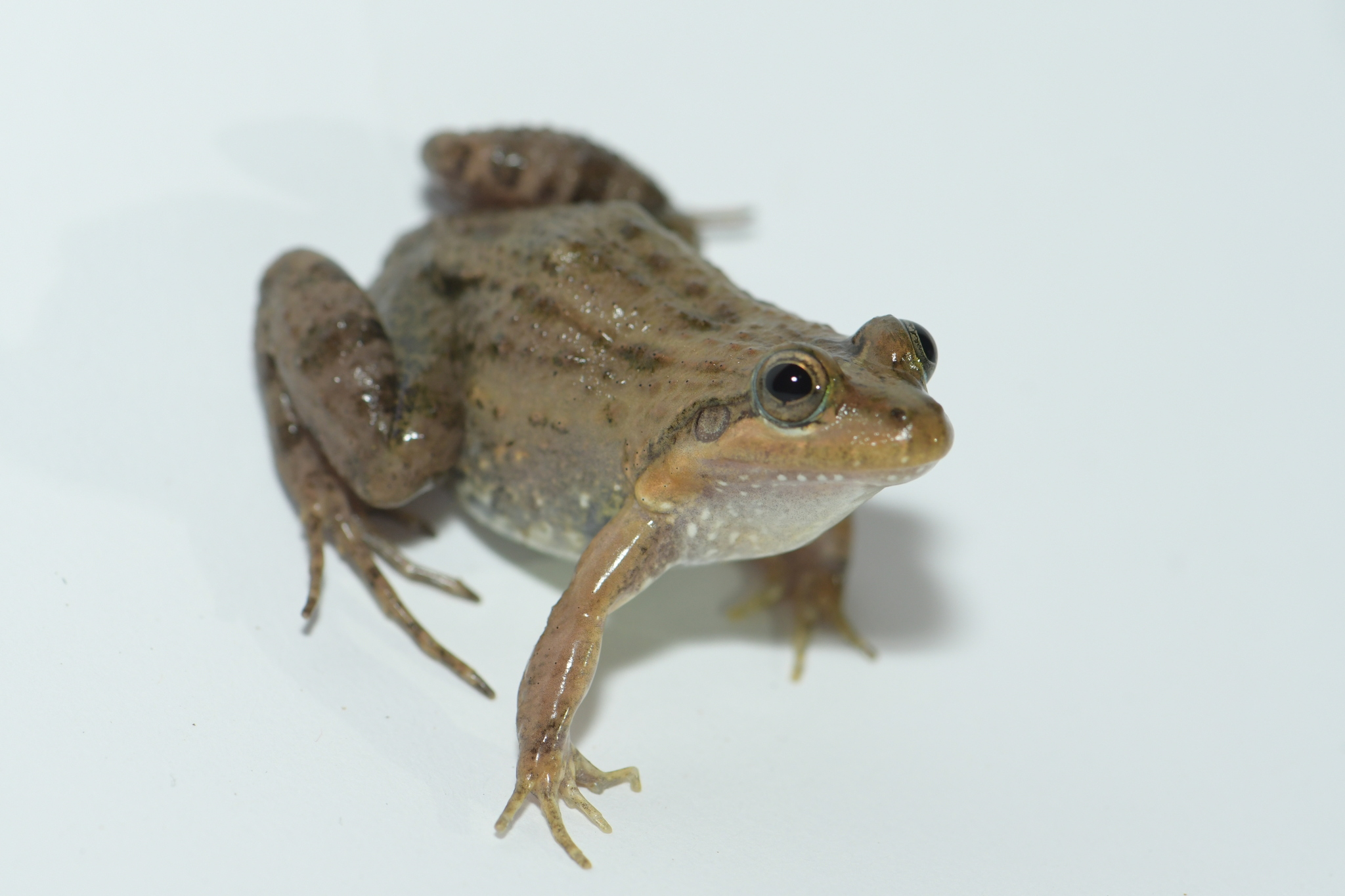
Oaxaca, Mexico

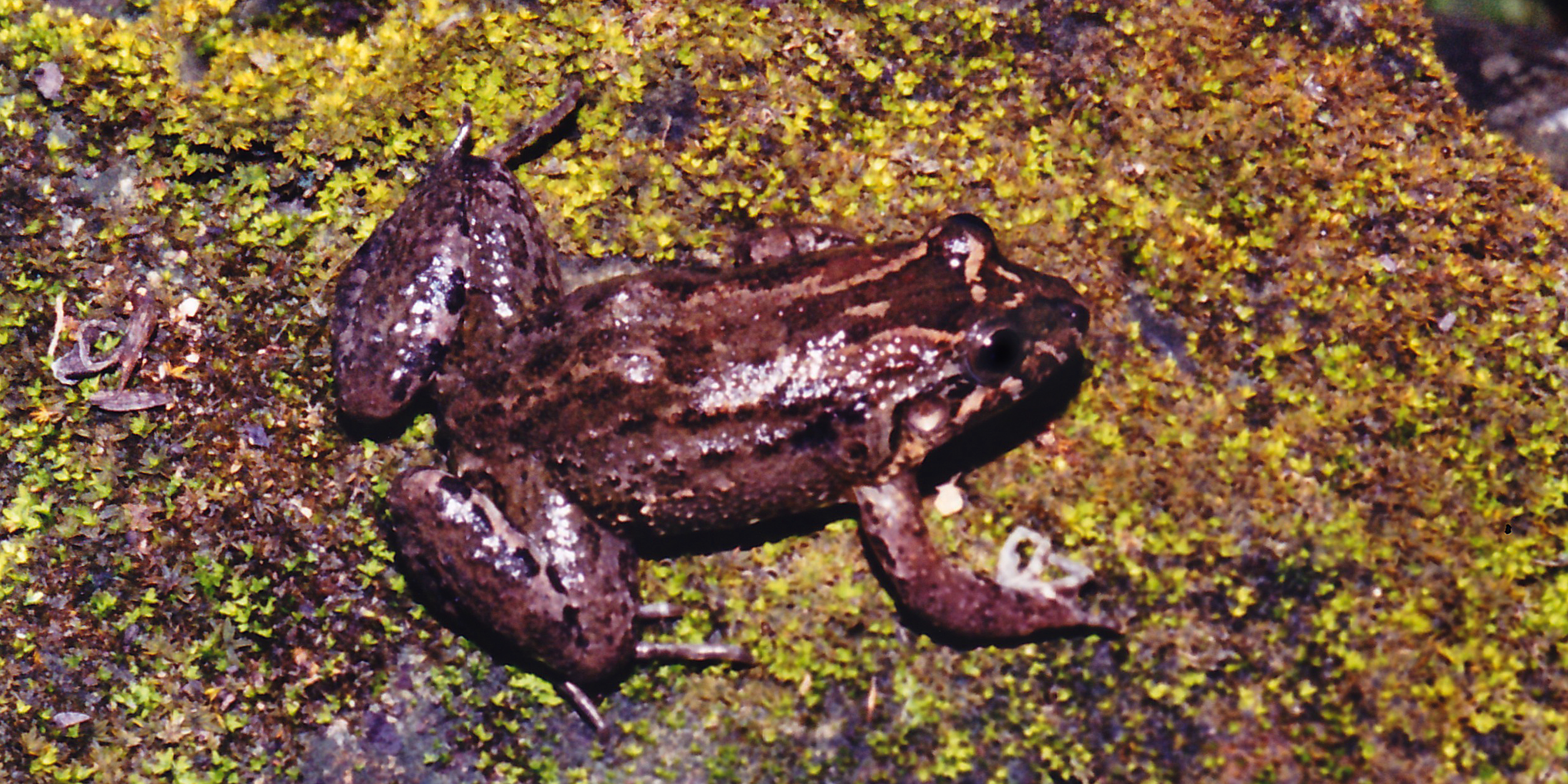
Sabinal Frog (Leptodactylus melanonotus) Municipality of Aldama, Tamaulipas, Mexico (3 June 2004).
