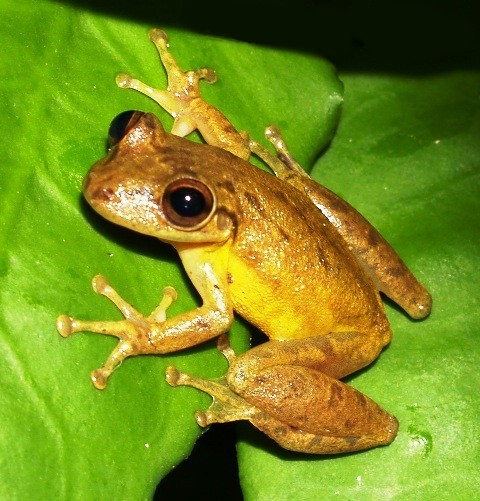

Conservation status
- Least Concern (IUCN 3.1)

Scientific classification
- Kingdom: Animalia
- Phylum: Chordata
- Class: Amphibia
- Order: Anura
- Family: Hylidae
- Genus: Scinax
- Species: S. staufferi

Binomial name
- Scinax staufferi (Cope, 1865)

= Scinax staufferi =

Species of frog

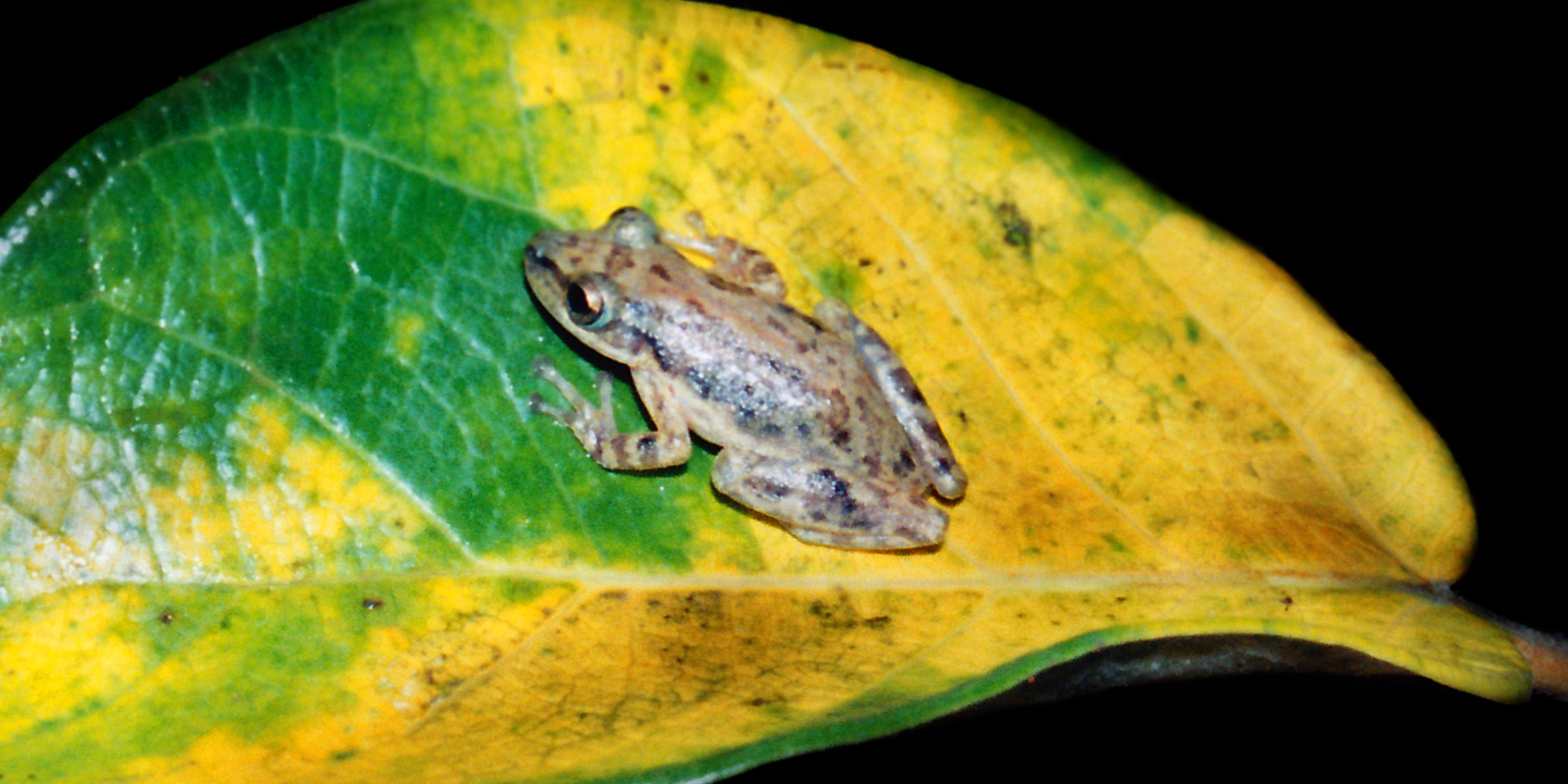
Stauffer's Treefrog (Scinax staufferi) Municipality of Aldama, Tamaulipas, Mexico (30 May 2005).

Scinax staufferi is a species of frog in the family Hylidae. It is found in Belize, Costa Rica, El Salvador, Guatemala, Honduras, Mexico, and Nicaragua. Its natural habitats are subtropical or tropical dry forests, subtropical or tropical moist montane forests, moist savanna, subtropical or tropical seasonally wet or flooded lowland grassland, freshwater marshes, intermittent freshwater marshes, pastureland, rural gardens, heavily degraded former forest, ponds, and canals and ditches.
