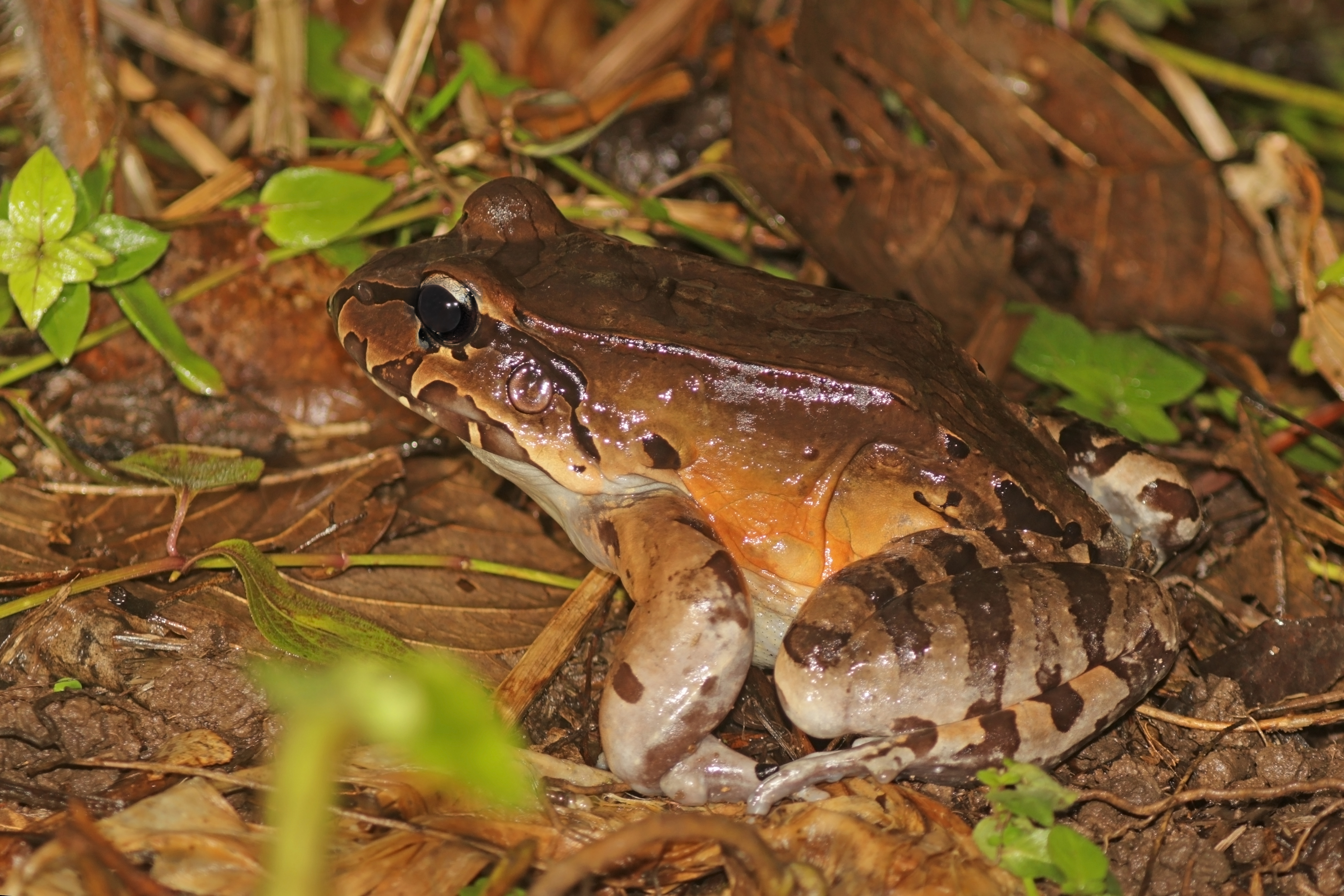

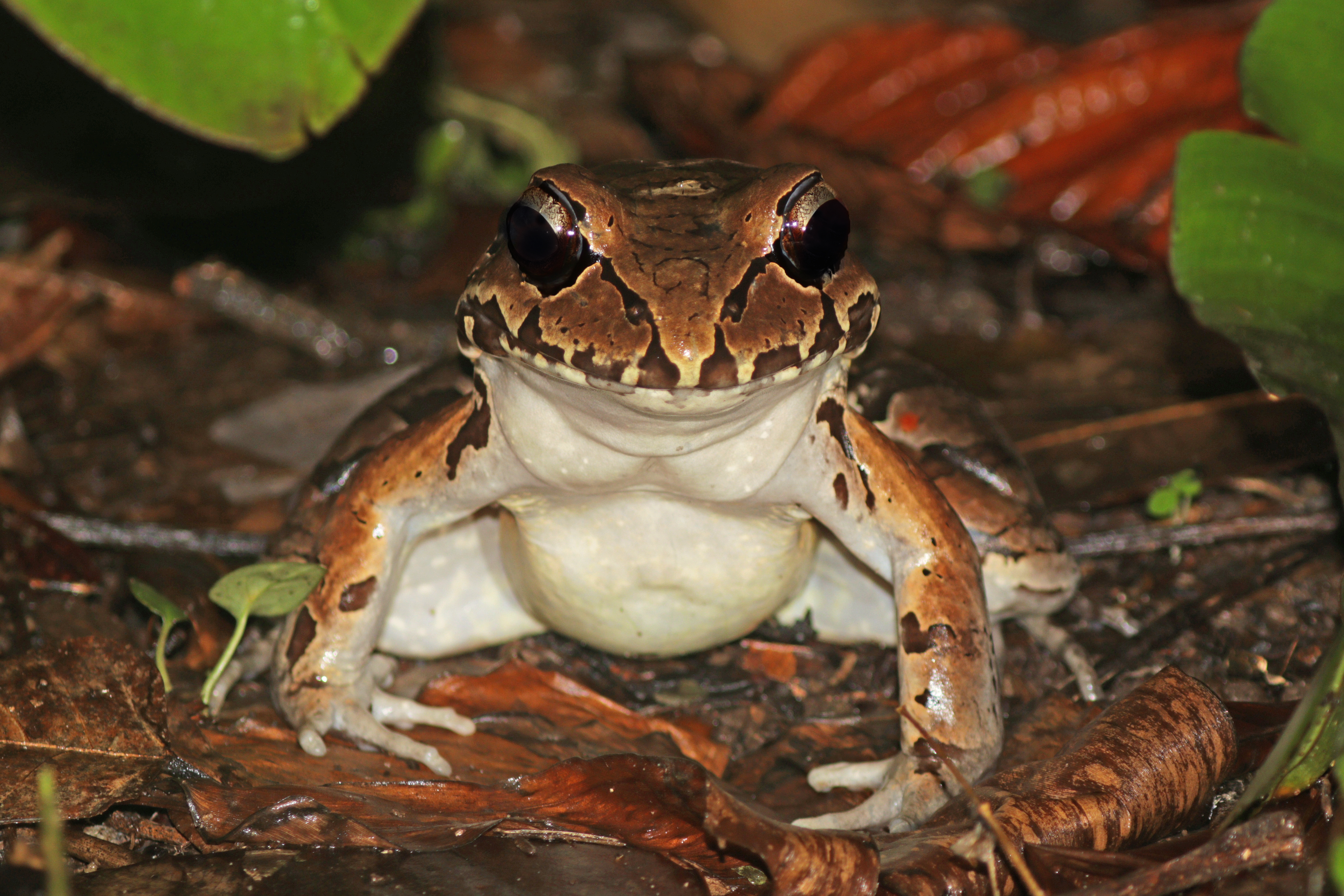
- in the Anton Valley, Panama

Conservation status
- Least Concern (IUCN 3.1)

Scientific classification
- Kingdom: Animalia
- Phylum: Chordata
- Class: Amphibia
- Order: Anura
- Family: Leptodactylidae
- Genus: Leptodactylus
- Species: L. savagei

Binomial name
- Leptodactylus savagei Heyer, 2005

= Leptodactylus savagei =

Species of amphibian

Leptodactylus savagei, or Savage's thin-toed frog, is a species of leptodactylid frog which ranges from eastern Honduras, through Nicaragua, Costa Rica and Panama to Colombia adjacent to Panama, with a seemingly disjunct population present in the area of Santa Marta in northern Colombia, at elevations from close to the sea level to 660 m (2,170 ft).

These frogs are nocturnal and terrestrial.

== Description ==
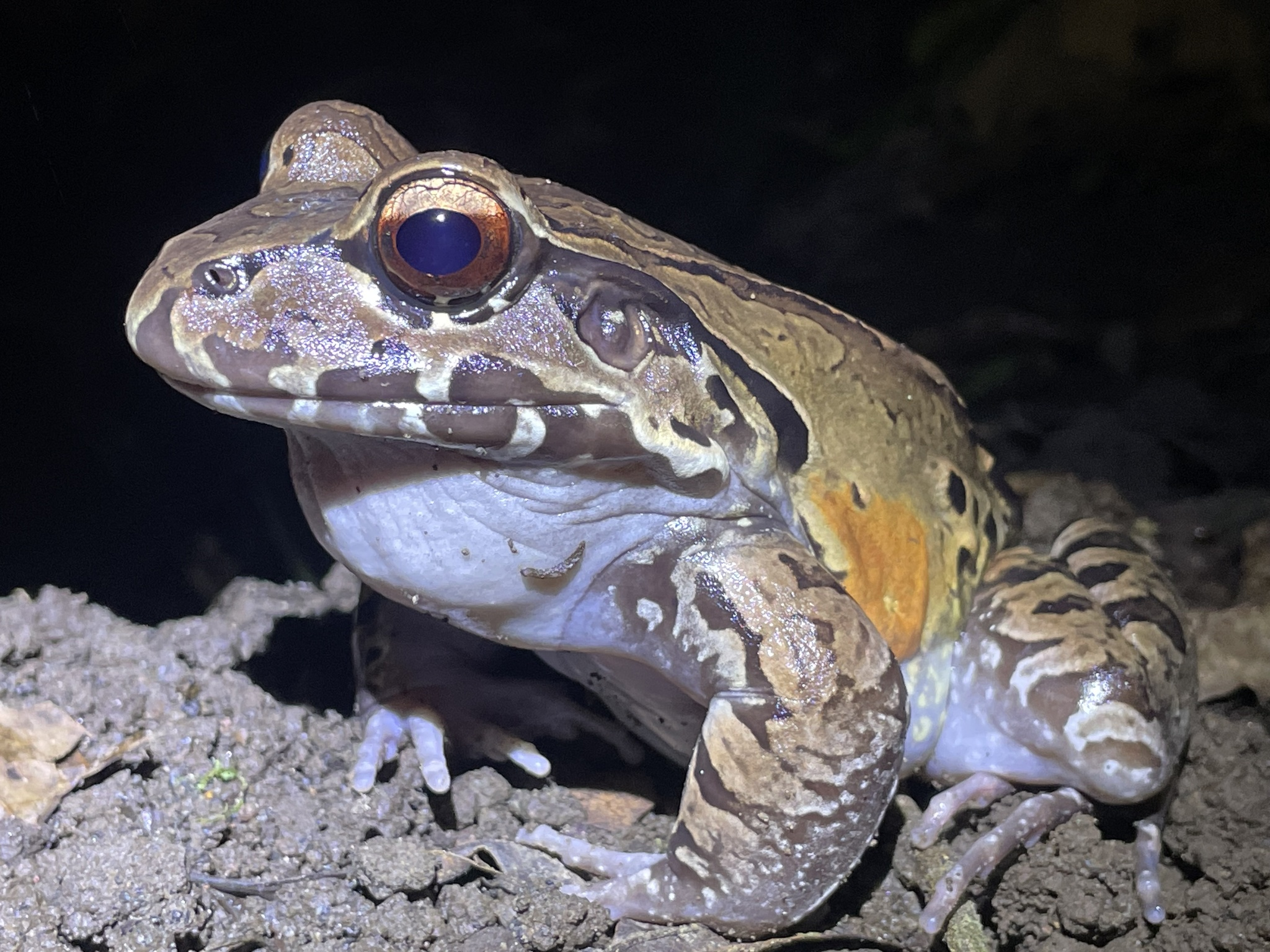
In Costa Rica

This frog has a brown or bronze back, sometimes with reddish brown spots. It has brown spots in the lips and frequently a black stripe over the tympanum. The rear part of the thigh is brownish, however, it can has reddish colours. The males have an internal vocal sac and one of more corneous spines on the thumps and sometimes on the chest that helps the male to grasp the female during the amplexus.

Males can reach a snout–vent length of 142 mm (5.6 in) and females of 146 mm (5.7 in).

== Reproductive biology ==
The male calls from puddles produced and maintained by rain. When a female attends the call, the male grasps her in an axillary amplexus. The couple mixes water, air, semen and secretions to create a foam nest that can contain from 2 to 7 liters of foam. This foam can feed and moisten the tadpoles during the entire metamorphosis which takes about a month. The larvae will eat dead tadpoles of their own species.
