= Craugastor ranoides =

Conservation status
- Critically Endangered (IUCN 3.1)

Scientific classification
- Kingdom: Animalia
- Phylum: Chordata
- Class: Amphibia
- Order: Anura
- Family: Craugastoridae
- Genus: Craugastor
- Species: C. ranoides

Binomial name
- Craugastor ranoides (Cope, 1886)

Synonyms
- Lithodytes ranoides Cope, 1886; Liohyla pittieri Günther, 1900; Eleutherodactylus ranoides (Cope, 1886); Eleutherodactylus pittieri (Günther, 1900)

Species of frog

Craugastor ranoides is a species of frog in the family Craugastoridae. It is found in the southern Atlantic lowland of Nicaragua and northwestern Costa Rica, and through Costa Rica to extreme western Panama. Its natural habitats are, principally, lowland and premontane wet forests in association with small streams, but also dry forests with perennial streams. It is threatened by habitat loss and chytridiomycosis. The species has disappeared from much of its former range in Costa Rica, also in pristine habitats, possibly because of chytridiomycosis.
