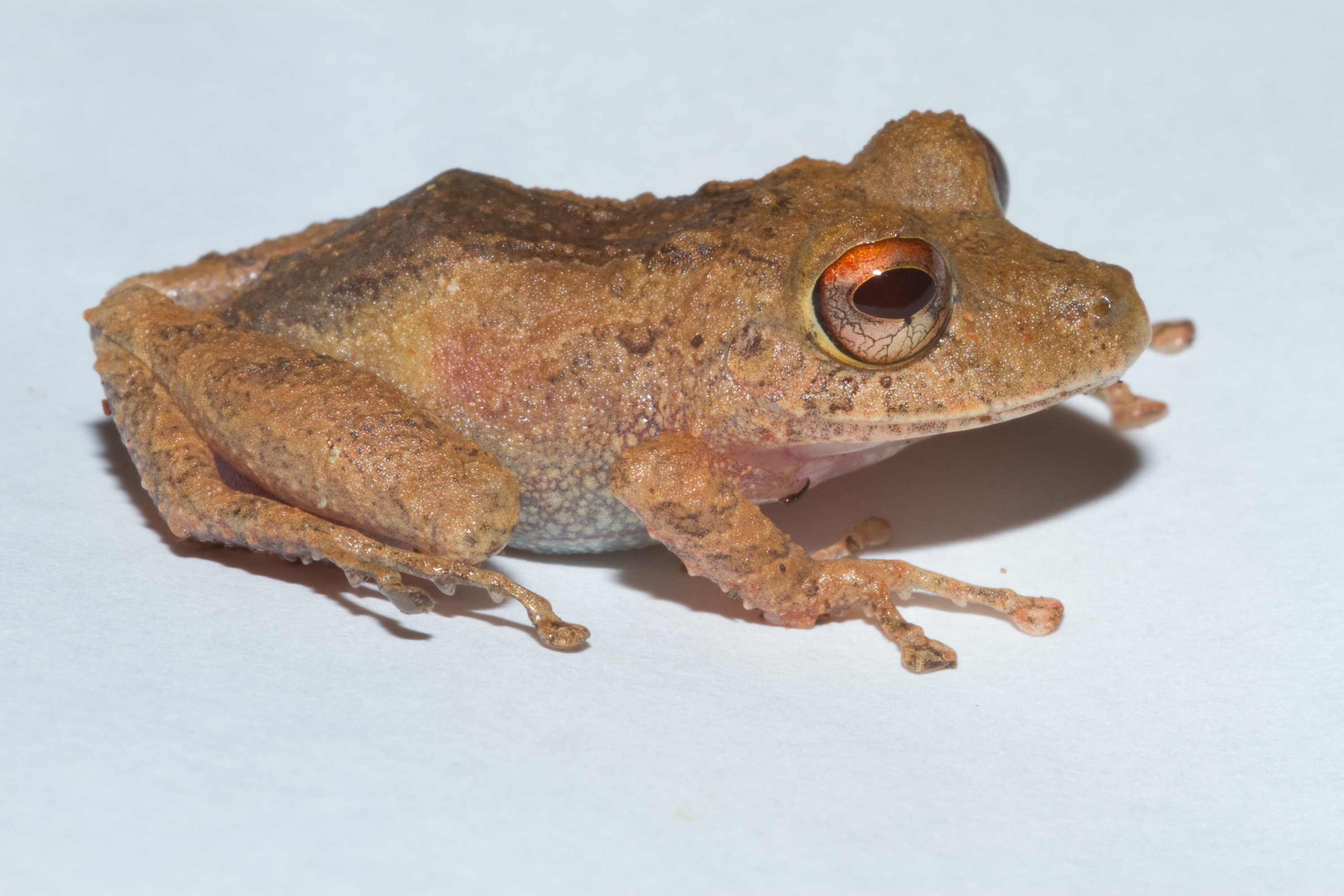

Conservation status
- Least Concern (IUCN 3.1)

Scientific classification
- Kingdom: Animalia
- Phylum: Chordata
- Class: Amphibia
- Order: Anura
- Family: Strabomantidae
- Genus: Pristimantis
- Species: P. cerasinus

Binomial name
- Pristimantis cerasinus (Cope, 1875)

Synonyms
- Eleutherodactylus cerasinus Cope, 1875; Eleutherodactylus operosus Savage, McCranie & Wilson, 1999; Eleutherodactylus peraltae Barbour, 1928; Eleutherodactylus tiptoni Lynch, 1964

= Pristimantis cerasinus =

Species of frog

Pristimantis cerasinus, also known as Limon robber frog, is a species of frog in the family Strabomantidae. It is found in Costa Rica, Honduras, Nicaragua, and Panama from sea level to 1,300 m (4,300 ft) asl. Its natural habitats are humid lowland and montane forests. It can sometimes occur on small coffee farms. It is threatened by habitat loss.
