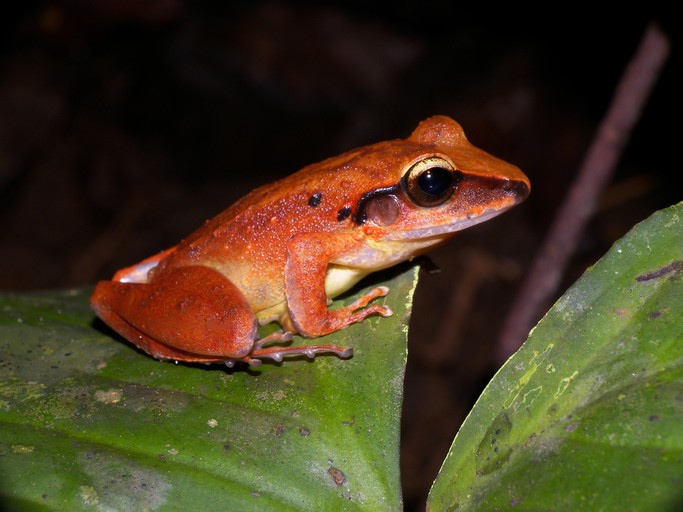

Conservation status
- Least Concern (IUCN 3.1)

Scientific classification
- Kingdom: Animalia
- Phylum: Chordata
- Class: Amphibia
- Order: Anura
- Family: Craugastoridae
- Genus: Craugastor
- Subgenus: Craugastor
- Species: C. fitzingeri

Binomial name
- Craugastor fitzingeri (Schmidt, 1857)

Synonyms
- Hylodes fitzingeri Schmidt, 1857; Hyla grisea Hallowell, 1861 "1860"; Craugastor pulchrigulus Cope, 1862; Leiyla Güntheri Keferstein, 1868; Hylodes nubilus Günther, 1901; Eleutherodactylus fitzingeri (Schmidt, 1857)

= Craugastor fitzingeri =

Species of amphibian

Craugastor fitzingeri is a species of frog in the family Craugastoridae. It is found in northwestern Colombia, Panama, Costa Rica, eastern Nicaragua, and northeastern Honduras. The specific name fitzingeri honors Leopold Fitzinger, an Austrian zoologist. Common name Fitzinger's robber frog has been coined for this species.

== Description ==
Adult males measure 24–35 mm (0.9–1.4 in) and adult females 35–53 mm (1.4–2.1 in) in snout–vent length. The snout is subacuminate in dorsal view. The tympanum is prominent. The fingers and the toes bear discs; the toes are moderately webbed. Skin typically bears warts and ridges. The dorsal coloration varies from gray-brown to brown to orange-brown. Some individuals have a wide, light middorsal stripe. Most individuals have only some blackish spots and a vague, darker dorsal pattern. The throat is typically grey with a white line down the middle. The belly is pale white or yellow.

The male advertisement call is a variable series of harsh chirps or clacks.

== Habitat and conservation ==
Craugastor fitzingeri occurs in humid lowland and montane forests below 1,520 m (4,990 ft). It is often found in disturbed forest or forest edge, although it does not occur in secondary forest in the Colombian part of its range. In lowland dry forest areas, it is restricted to riparian gallery forest in the dry season, but ranges more widely in the wet season. By day these frogs are found on the forest floor, usually concealed in leaf litter, but they can also be active. At night, they often climb onto logs or into low vegetation. Males typically call at dusk from elevated positions on low herbs and in bushes, etc.

This species can be locally abundant, but some populations have declined. No major threats to it have been identified. Its range overlaps with several protected areas.
