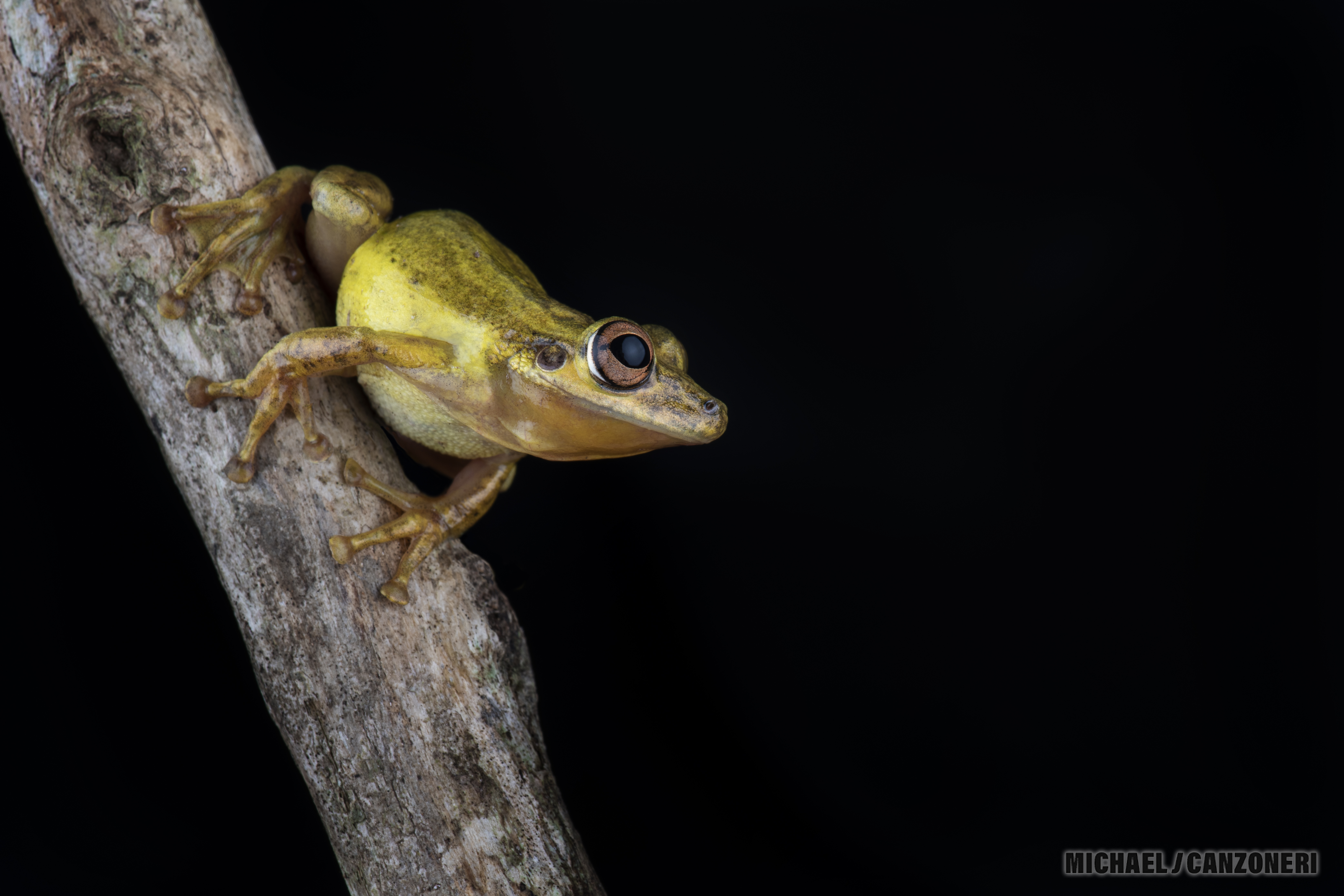

Conservation status
- Least Concern (IUCN 3.1)

Scientific classification
- Kingdom: Animalia
- Phylum: Chordata
- Class: Amphibia
- Order: Anura
- Family: Hylidae
- Genus: Scinax
- Species: S. elaeochroa

Binomial name
- Scinax elaeochroa (Cope, 1875)

Synonyms
- Hyla elaeochroa Cope, 1875 "1876"; Hyla quinquevittata Cope, 1886; Hyla dulcensis Taylor, 1958; Scinax elaeochroa (Cope, 1875); Scinax elaeochraoa (misspelling)

= Scinax elaeochroa =

Sipurio snouted treefrog

Species of frog

Scinax elaeochroa, commonly known as the Sipurio snouted treefrog, or olive snouted treefrog, is a species of frog in the family Hylidae. It is found in the Caribbean lowlands of Nicaragua and Panama and in the Pacific lowlands of Costa Rica and Panama, with an isolated population in Colombia.

== Description ==
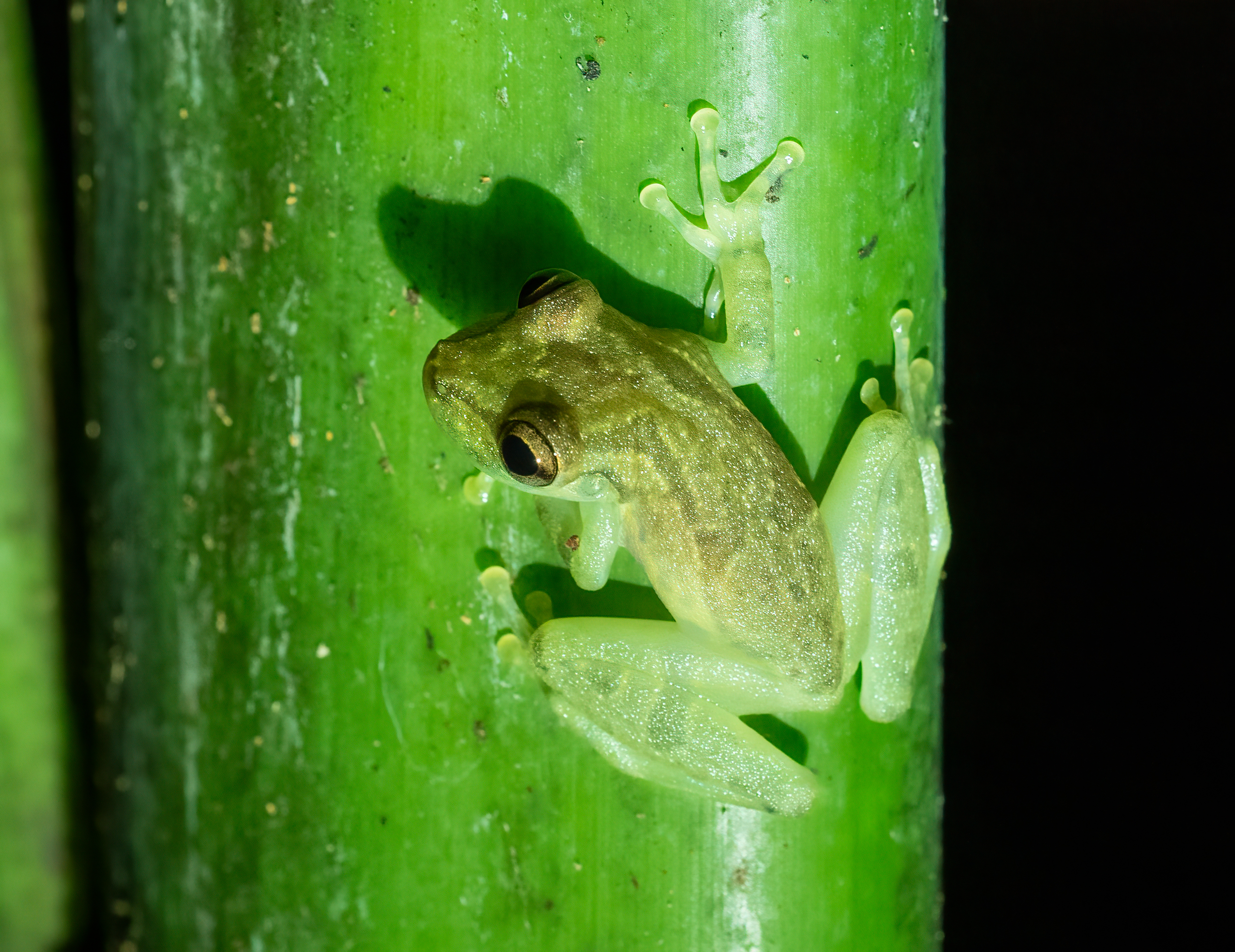
Scinax elaeochroa in Costa Rica

Males grow to 38 mm (1.5 in) and females to 40 mm (1.6 in) in snout–vent length. The snout is protruding. The dorsum is yellowish, sometimes with a hint of green or light brown, and turns brilliant yellow in breeding males. There are usually some darker markings on the dorsum. The arms and legs are usually barred. The venter varies from cream to yellow to orange; the throat is usually yellow.

The vocal sac in breeding males is bright yellow-orange. The advertisement call is a series of short "waaks".

== Habitat and conservation ==
The natural habitats of Scinax elaeochroa are humid lowland and lower premontane forests, occurring also in secondary and disturbed forest habitats. It can be found from sea level to 1,200 m (3,900 ft) above sea level (to 1,500 m (4,900 ft) asl in Colombia). It is primarily a nocturnal species that breeds in temporary ponds during the wet season. Eggs are laid in ponds or on adjacent vegetation, and the tadpoles develop in the pond.

Though a common and somewhat adaptable species, Scinax elaeochrous is potentially threatened by deforestation.
