= Cukra climbing salamander =

Conservation status
- Least Concern (IUCN 3.1)

Scientific classification
- Kingdom: Animalia
- Phylum: Chordata
- Class: Amphibia
- Order: Urodela
- Family: Plethodontidae
- Genus: Bolitoglossa
- Species: B. striatula

Binomial name
- Bolitoglossa striatula (Noble, 1918)

Species of amphibian

The Cukra climbing salamander (Bolitoglossa striatula) is a species of salamander in the family Plethodontidae. It is found in Costa Rica, Honduras, and Nicaragua. Its natural habitats are subtropical or tropical moist lowland forests, subtropical or tropical moist montane forests, freshwater marshes, and plantations . It is threatened by habitat loss.
