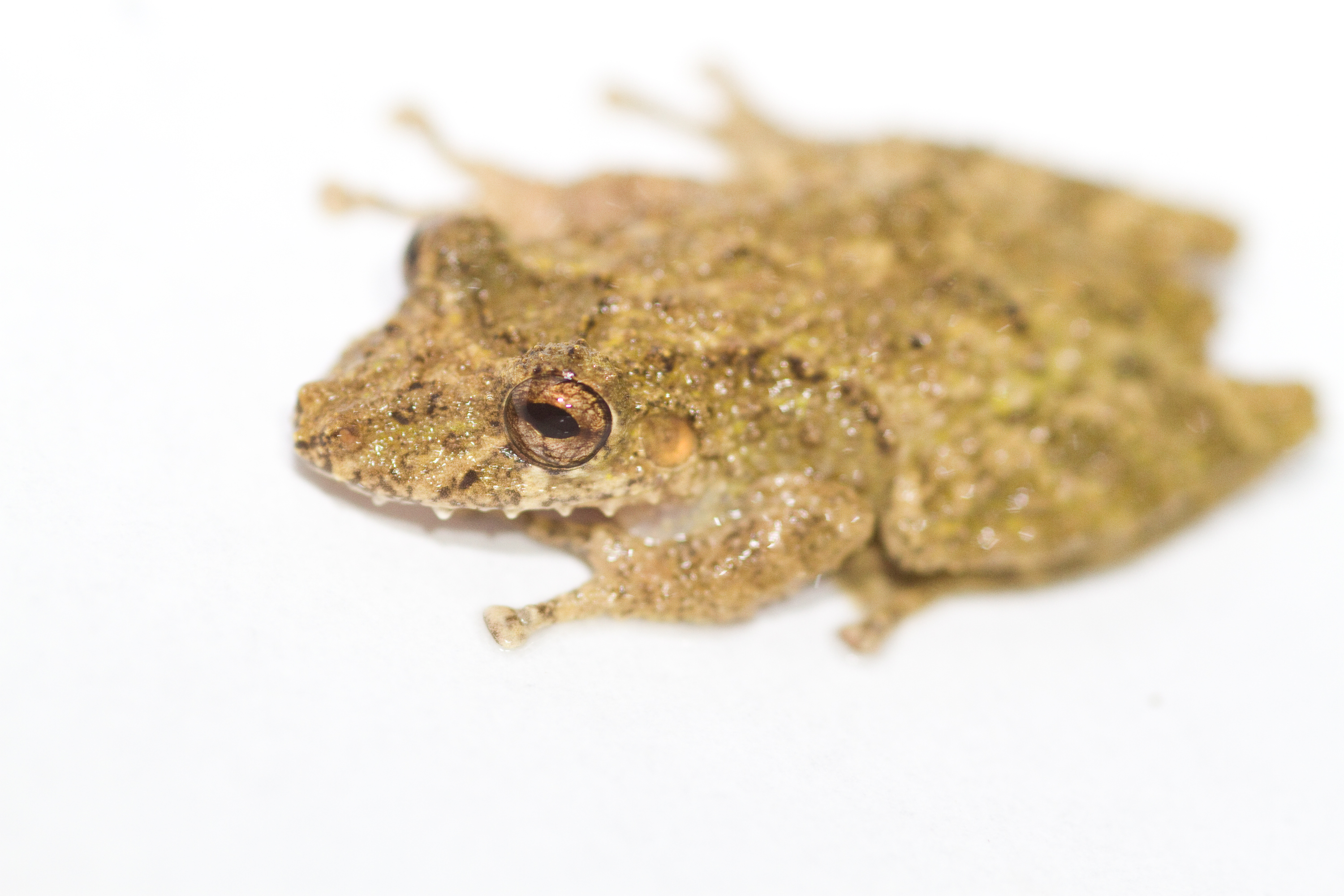

Conservation status
- Least Concern (IUCN 3.1)

Scientific classification
- Kingdom: Animalia
- Phylum: Chordata
- Class: Amphibia
- Order: Anura
- Family: Hylidae
- Genus: Scinax
- Species: S. boulengeri

Binomial name
- Scinax boulengeri (Cope, 1887)

= Scinax boulengeri =

Species of amphibian

Scinax boulengeri (commonly known as Boulenger's snouted tree frog) is a species of frog in the family Hylidae. It is found in Colombia, Costa Rica, Nicaragua, Panama, and possibly Honduras. Its natural habitats are subtropical or tropical moist lowland forests, intermittent freshwater marshes, pastureland, plantations, rural gardens, and urban areas. It has been found as high as 600 meters above sea level.

The adult male frog measures 36 to 49 mm long in snout-vent length and the adult female frog 42 to 53 mm. This frog is gray, dull green, or light brown in color with darker brown marks and tuberculate skin on its dorsum. It has dark brown marks. It can have a triangle between its eyes. There are bars on its front and back legs. It has a white throat and white ventrum. Its middle is green. Its sides are yellow-green.

This frog is arboreal and nocturnal. When human beings see it, it is usually perching on a shrub or other mid-sized plant. Unlike other tree frogs, its breeding season is not closely linked to rainfall. The male frogs hide in vegetation near the edges of ponds. Then they sing for the female frogs for about four hours. The female frog lays eggs in shallow water, 600–700 per clutch. The eggs hatch after 1–1.5 days. The silver-yellow tadpoles grow into frogs in 40 to 88 days.
