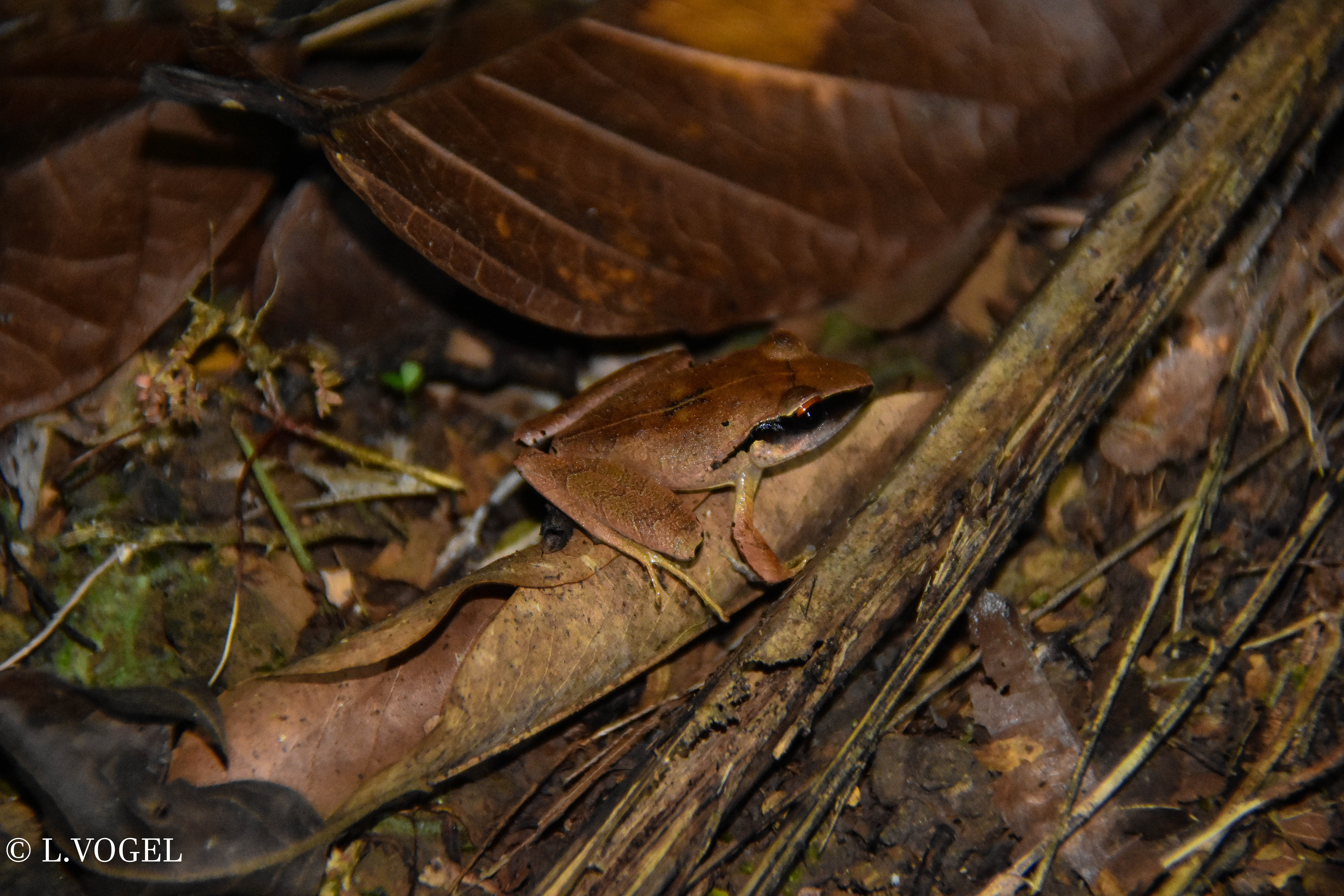

Conservation status
- Least Concern (IUCN 3.1)

Scientific classification
- Kingdom: Animalia
- Phylum: Chordata
- Class: Amphibia
- Order: Anura
- Clade: Brachycephaloidea
- Family: Craugastoridae
- Genus: Craugastor
- Species: C. noblei

Binomial name
- Craugastor noblei (Barbour & Dunn, 1921)

= Craugastor noblei =

Species of frog

Craugastor noblei is a species of frog in the family Craugastoridae. It is found in Costa Rica, Honduras, Nicaragua, and Panama. Its natural habitat is subtropical or tropical moist lowland forests. It is threatened by habitat loss.
