= Oedipina gracilis =

Conservation status
- Endangered (IUCN 3.1)

Scientific classification
- Kingdom: Animalia
- Phylum: Chordata
- Class: Amphibia
- Order: Urodela
- Family: Plethodontidae
- Genus: Oedipina
- Species: O. gracilis

Binomial name
- Oedipina gracilis Taylor, 1952

Species of salamander

Oedipina gracilis is a species of salamander in the family Plethodontidae. It is found in Costa Rica and Panama. Its natural habitat is subtropical or tropical moist lowland forests. It is threatened by habitat loss.
