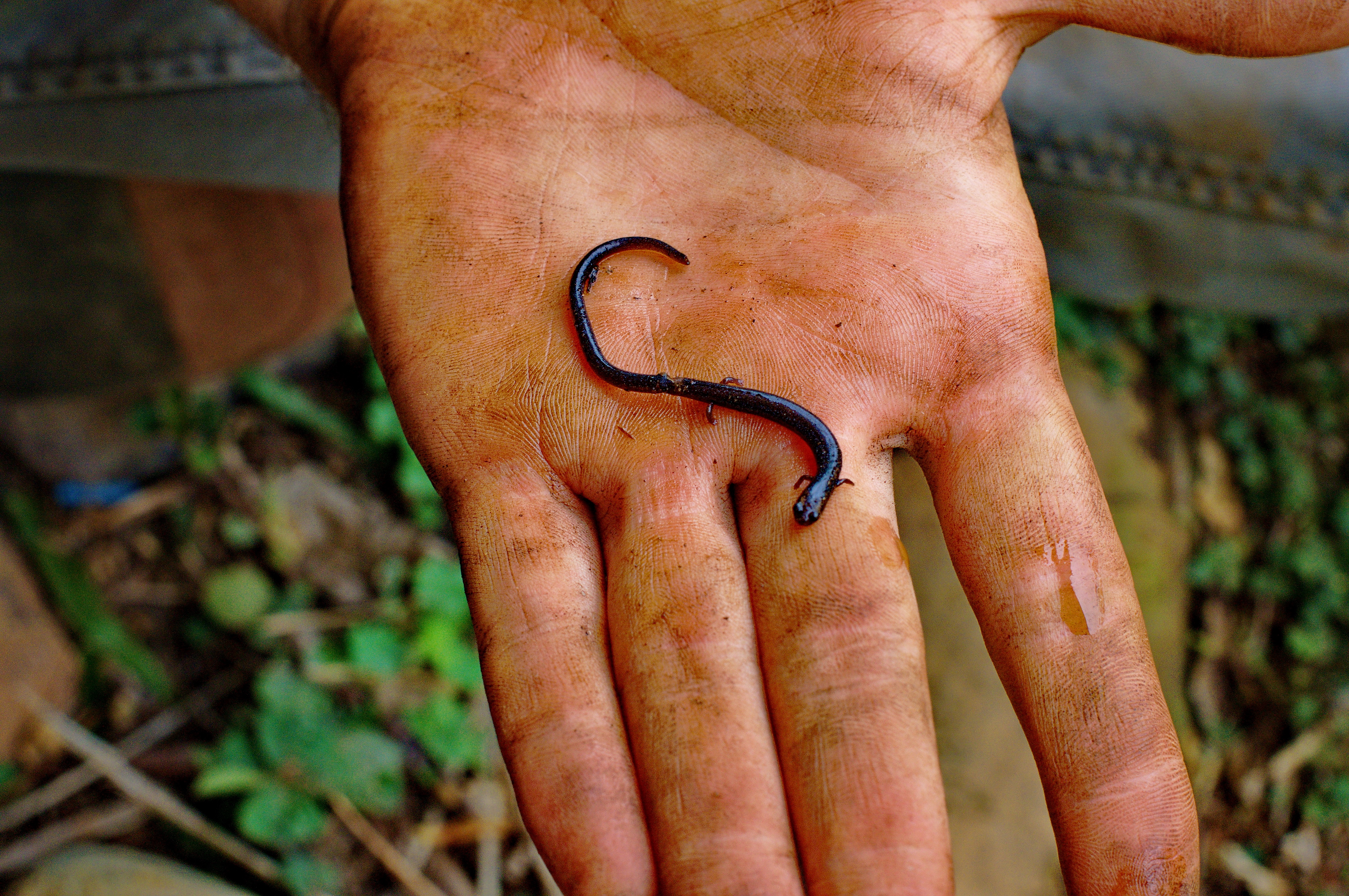

Conservation status
- Least Concern (IUCN 3.1)

Scientific classification
- Kingdom: Animalia
- Phylum: Chordata
- Class: Amphibia
- Order: Urodela
- Family: Plethodontidae
- Genus: Oedipina
- Species: O. uniformis

Binomial name
- Oedipina uniformis Keferstein, 1868

Synonyms
- Oedipina bonitaensis Taylor, 1952; Oedipina inusitata Taylor, 1952; Oedipina longicauda Taylor, 1952; Oedipina longissima Taylor, 1952; Oedipina syndactyla Taylor, 1948; Ophiobatrachus vermicularis Gray, 1868

= Oedipina uniformis =

Species of salamander

Oedipina uniformis is a species of salamander in the family Plethodontidae. It is found in the mountains and lowlands of central Costa Rica up to the Panamian border, and is likely to occur in Panama.

Oedipina uniformis inhabits humid premontane and lower montane forests where it lives in leaf-litter, under decaying logs, and in moss banks. It can, however, withstand significant habitat modification, and has also been found in pastures, gardens and even cities.

It is generally not threatened by habitat loss.
