= List of amphibians of Panama =

This is a list of amphibians found in Panama. 205 amphibian species have been registered in Panama, which are grouped in 3 orders: Caecilians (Gymnophiona), Salamanders (Caudata) and Frogs and Toads (Anura). This list is derived from the database listing of AmphibiaWeb. 25 species are critically endangered(CR), 16 species are endangered (EN) and 6 species are vulnerable (VU). One species has recently (September 2016) gone extinct with the last individual in captivity dying, and with not a single specimen seen nor heard in the wild for over a decade. Several other species might also be extinct with no specimen found for decades.

The following tags are used to highlight specific species' conservation status as assessed by the IUCN:

EX	Extinct	No reasonable doubt that the last individual has died.
EW	Extinct in the wild	Known only to survive in captivity or as a naturalized populations well outside its previous range.
CR	Critically Endangered	The species is in imminent risk of extinction in the wild.
EN	Endangered	The species is facing an extremely high risk of extinction in the wild.
VU	Vulnerable	The species is facing a high risk of extinction in the wild.
NT	Near Threatened	The species does not meet any of the criteria that would categorise it as risking extinction but it is likely to do so in the future.
LC	Least Concern	There are no current identifiable risks to the species.
DD	Data Deficient	There is inadequate information to make an assessment of the risks to this species.

== Caecilians (Gymnophiona) ==
=== Caeciliidae ===
Order: Gymnophiona. Family: Caeciliidae

- Caecilia isthmica (DD)
- Caecilia leucocephala (LC)
- Caecilia nigricans (LC)
- Caecilia tentaculata (LC)
- Caecilia volcani (DD)
- Oscaecilia elongata (DD)
- Oscaecilia ochrocephala (LC)

== Salamanders (Caudata) ==
=== Plethodontidae ===
Order: Caudata. Family: Plethodontidae

- Bolitoglossa anthracina (DD)
- Bolitoglossa biseriata (LC)
- Bolitoglossa bramei (DD)
- Bolitoglossa colonnea (LC)
- Bolitoglossa compacta (EN)
- Bolitoglossa copia (DD)
- Bolitoglossa cuna (DD)
- Bolitoglossa gomezi (DD)
- Bolitoglossa lignicolor (VU)
- Bolitoglossa magnifica (EN)
- Bolitoglossa marmorea (EN)
- Bolitoglossa medemi (VU)
- Bolitoglossa minutula (EN)
- Bolitoglossa phalarosoma (DD)
- Bolitoglossa pygmaea
- Bolitoglossa robinsoni
- Bolitoglossa robusta (LC)
- Bolitoglossa schizodactyla (LC)
- Bolitoglossa sombra (VU)
- Bolitoglossa taylori (DD)
- Oedipina alfaroi (VU)
- Oedipina collaris (DD)
- Oedipina complex (LC)
- Oedipina cyclocauda (LC)
- Oedipina fortunensis
- Oedipina grandis (EN)
- Oedipina maritima (CR)
- Oedipina parvipes (LC)

== Toads and frogs (Anura) ==
=== Bufonidae ===
Order: Anura. Family: Bufonidae

- Atelopus certus (EN)
- Atelopus chiriquiensis (CR)
- Atelopus glyphus (CR)
- Atelopus limosus (EN)
- Atelopus varius (CR)
- Atelopus zeteki (CR)
- Incilius aucoinae (LC)
- Incilius coniferus (LC)
- Incilius epioticus (LC)
- Incilius fastidiosus (CR)
- Incilius karenlipsae
- Incilius melanochlorus (LC)
- Incilius peripatetes (CR)
- Incilius signifer (LC)
- Rhaebo haematiticus (LC)
- Rhinella acrolopha (DD)
- Rhinella alata (DD)
- Rhinella centralis
- Rhinella horribilis (LC)
- Rhinella marina (LC)

=== Centrolenidae ===
Order: Anura. Family: Centrolenidae

- Cochranella euknemos (LC)
- Cochranella granulosa (LC)
- Espadarana prosoblepon (LC)
- Hyalinobatrachium aureoguttatum (NT)
- Hyalinobatrachium chirripoi (LC)
- Hyalinobatrachium colymbiphyllum (LC)
- Hyalinobatrachium fleischmanni (LC)
- Hyalinobatrachium valerioi (LC)
- Hyalinobatrachium vireovittatum (DD)
- Sachatamia albomaculata (LC)
- Sachatamia ilex (LC)
- Teratohyla pulverata (LC)
- Teratohyla spinosa (LC)

=== Craugastoridae ===
Order: Anura. Family: Craugastoridae

- Craugastor andi (CR)
- Craugastor azueroensis (EN)
- Craugastor bransfordii (LC)
- Craugastor catalinae (CR)
- Craugastor crassidigitus (LC)
- Craugastor emcelae (CR)
- Craugastor evanesco
- Craugastor fitzingeri (LC)
- Craugastor fleischmanni (CR)
- Craugastor gollmeri (LC)
- Craugastor gulosus (EN)
- Craugastor jota (DD)
- Craugastor longirostris (LC)
- Craugastor megacephalus (LC)
- Craugastor melanostictus (LC)
- Craugastor monnichorum (DD)
- Craugastor noblei (LC)
- Craugastor obesus (EN)
- Craugastor opimus (LC)
- Craugastor podiciferus (NT)
- Craugastor polyptychus (LC)
- Craugastor punctariolus (EN)
- Craugastor raniformis (LC)
- Craugastor ranoides (CR)
- Craugastor rhyacobatrachus (EN)
- Craugastor rugosus (LC)
- Craugastor stejnegerianus (LC)
- Craugastor tabasarae (CR)
- Craugastor talamancae (LC)
- Craugastor taurus (CR)
- Craugastor underwoodi (LC)

=== Dendrobatidae ===
Order: Anura. Family: Dendrobatidae

- Allobates talamancae (LC)
- Ameerega maculata (DD)
- Andinobates claudiae (DD)
- Andinobates fulguritus (LC)
- Andinobates minutus (LC)
- Colostethus latinasus (DD)
- Colostethus panamansis (LC)
- Colostethus pratti (LC)
- Dendrobates auratus (LC)
- Oophaga arborea (EN)
- Oophaga granulifera (VU)
- Oophaga pumilio (LC)
- Oophaga speciosa (EN)
- Oophaga vicentei (DD)
- Phyllobates lugubris (LC)
- Silverstoneia flotator (LC)
- Silverstoneia nubicola (NT)

=== Dermophiidae ===
Order: Gymniophiona. Family: Dermophiidae

- Dermophis glandulosus (DD)
- Dermophis gracilior (DD)
- Dermophis parviceps (LC)
- Gymnopis multiplicata (LC)

=== Eleutherodactylidae ===
Order: Anura. Family: Eleutherodactylidae

- Diasporus diastema (LC)
- Diasporus quidditus (LC)
- Diasporus vocator (LC)
- Eleutherodactylus antillensis (LC)
- Eleutherodactylus johnstonei (LC)
- Eleutherodactylus planirostris (LC)

=== Hemiphractidae ===
Order: Anura. Family: Hemiphractidae

- Gastrotheca cornuta (EN)
- Gastrotheca nicefori (LC)
- Hemiphractus fasciatus (NT)

=== Hylidae ===
Order: Anura. Family: Hylidae

- Agalychnis callidryas (LC)
- Agalychnis lemur (CR)
- Agalychnis spurrelli (LC)
- Anotheca spinosa (LC)
- Cruziohyla calcarifer (LC)
- Dendropsophus ebraccatus (LC)
- Dendropsophus microcephalus (LC)
- Dendropsophus phlebodes (LC)
- Dendropsophus subocularis (LC)
- Duellmanohyla lythrodes (EN)
- Duellmanohyla uranochroa (CR)
- Ecnomiohyla fimbrimembra (EN)
- Ecnomiohyla miliaria (VU)
- Ecnomiohyla rabborum (EX)
- Ecnomiohyla thysanota (DD)
- Hyloscirtus colymba (CR)
- Hyloscirtus palmeri (LC)
- Hypsiboas boans (LC)
- Hypsiboas crepitans (LC)
- Hypsiboas pugnax (LC)
- Hypsiboas rosenbergi (LC)
- Hypsiboas rufitelus (LC)
- Isthmohyla angustilineata (CR)
- Isthmohyla calypsa (CR)
- Isthmohyla debilis (CR)
- Isthmohyla graceae (CR)
- Isthmohyla infucata (DD)
- Isthmohyla lancasteri (LC)
- Isthmohyla picadoi (NT)
- Isthmohyla pictipes (EN)
- Isthmohyla pseudopuma (LC)
- Isthmohyla rivularis (CR)
- Isthmohyla tica (CR)
- Isthmohyla zeteki (NT)
- Phyllomedusa venusta (LC)
- Ptychohyla legleri (EN)
- Scinax boulengeri (LC)
- Scinax elaeochroa (LC)
- Scinax rostratus (LC)
- Scinax ruber (LC)
- Scinax staufferi (LC)
- Smilisca phaeota (LC)
- Smilisca sila (LC)
- Smilisca sordida (LC)
- Trachycephalus venulosus (LC)

=== Leptodactylidae ===
Order: Anura. Family: Leptodactylidae

- Engystomops pustulosus (LC)
- Leptodactylus fragilis (LC)
- Leptodactylus fuscus (LC)
- Leptodactylus insularum
- Leptodactylus melanonotus (LC)
- Leptodactylus poecilochilus (LC)
- Leptodactylus savagei (LC)
- Pleurodema brachyops (LC)

=== Microhylidae ===
Order: Anura. Family: Microhylidae

- Chiasmocleis panamensis (LC)
- Elachistocleis ovalis (LC)
- Nelsonophryne aterrima (LC)
- Relictivomer pearsei (LC)

=== Pipidae ===
Order: Anura. Family: Pipidae

- Pipa myersi (EN)

=== Ranidae ===
Order: Anura. Family: Ranidae

- Rana vaillanti (LC)
- Rana vibicaria (CR)
- Rana warszewitschii (LC)

=== Strabomantidae ===
Order: Anura. Family: Strabomantidae

- Pristimantis achatinus (LC)
- Pristimantis adnus
- Pristimantis altae (NT)
- Pristimantis caryophyllaceus (NT)
- Pristimantis cerasinus (LC)
- Pristimantis cruentus (LC)
- Pristimantis educatoris
- Pristimantis gaigei (LC)
- Pristimantis moro (LC)
- Pristimantis museosus (EN)
- Pristimantis pardalis (NT)
- Pristimantis pirrensis (DD)
- Pristimantis ridens (LC)
- Pristimantis taeniatus (LC)
- Strabomantis bufoniformis (LC)
- Strabomantis laticorpus (DD)
