= A. limosus =

A. limosus may refer to:

- Amnicola limosus, the mud amnicola, an aquatic snail species found in the Northwest Atlantic Ocean and along the Gulf of Maine
- Atelopus limosus, the sapo limosa or limosa harlequin frog, an endangered toad species endemic to Panama
