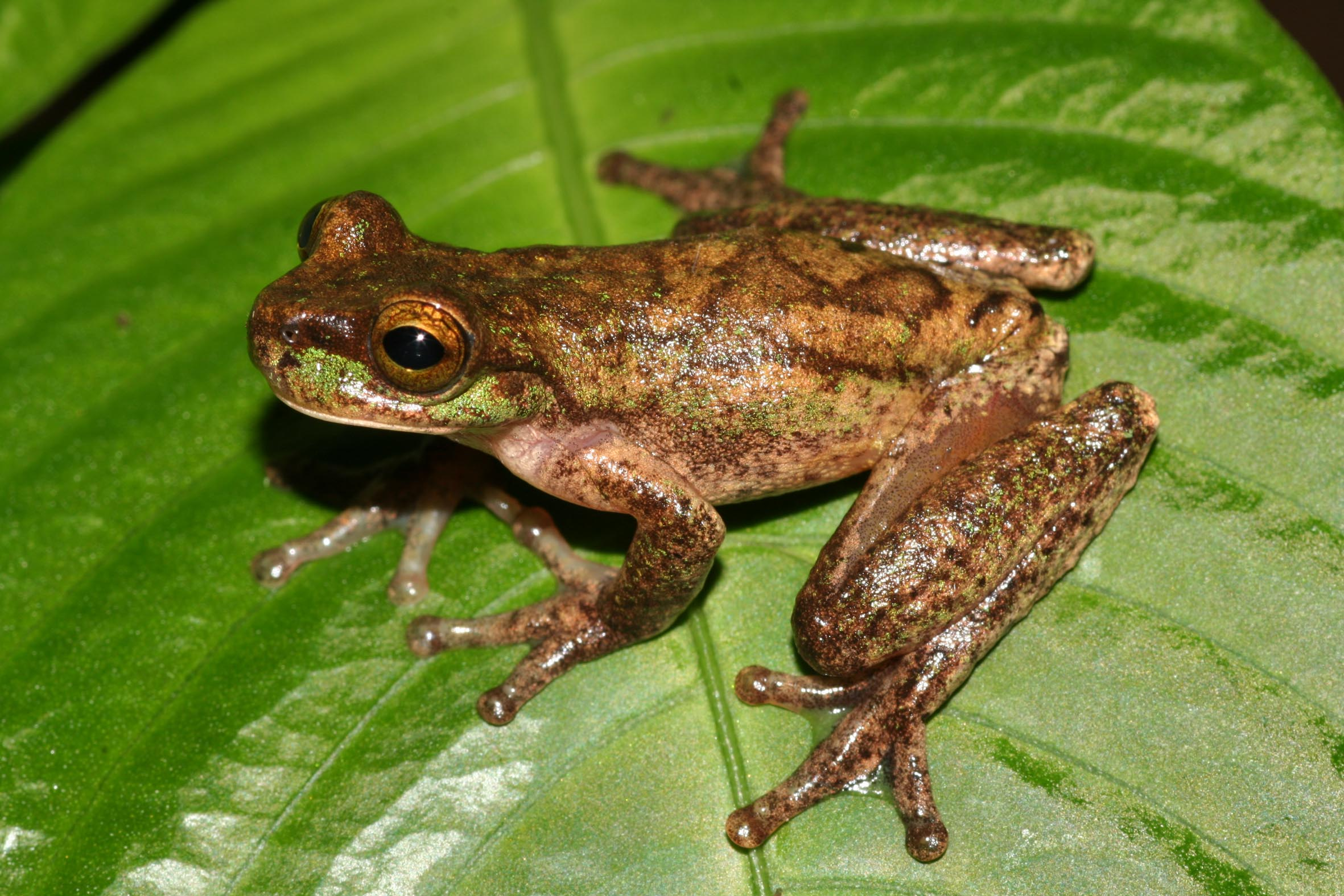
- Isthmohyla rivularis

Scientific classification
- Kingdom: Animalia
- Phylum: Chordata
- Class: Amphibia
- Order: Anura
- Family: Hylidae
- Subfamily: Hylinae
- Genus: Isthmohyla; Faivovich, Haddad, Garcia, Frost, Campbell, and Wheeler, 2005

Type species
- Hyla pseudopuma Günther, 1901

Diversity
- 14 species

= Isthmohyla =

Genus of amphibians

Isthmohyla is a genus of frogs in the family Hylidae. This genus was erected in 2005 following a major revision of the Hylidae. The 15 species in this genus were previously placed in the genus Hyla. They are endemic to Central America in Honduras, Costa Rica, and Panama.

== Species ==
This genus has 14 recognized species:

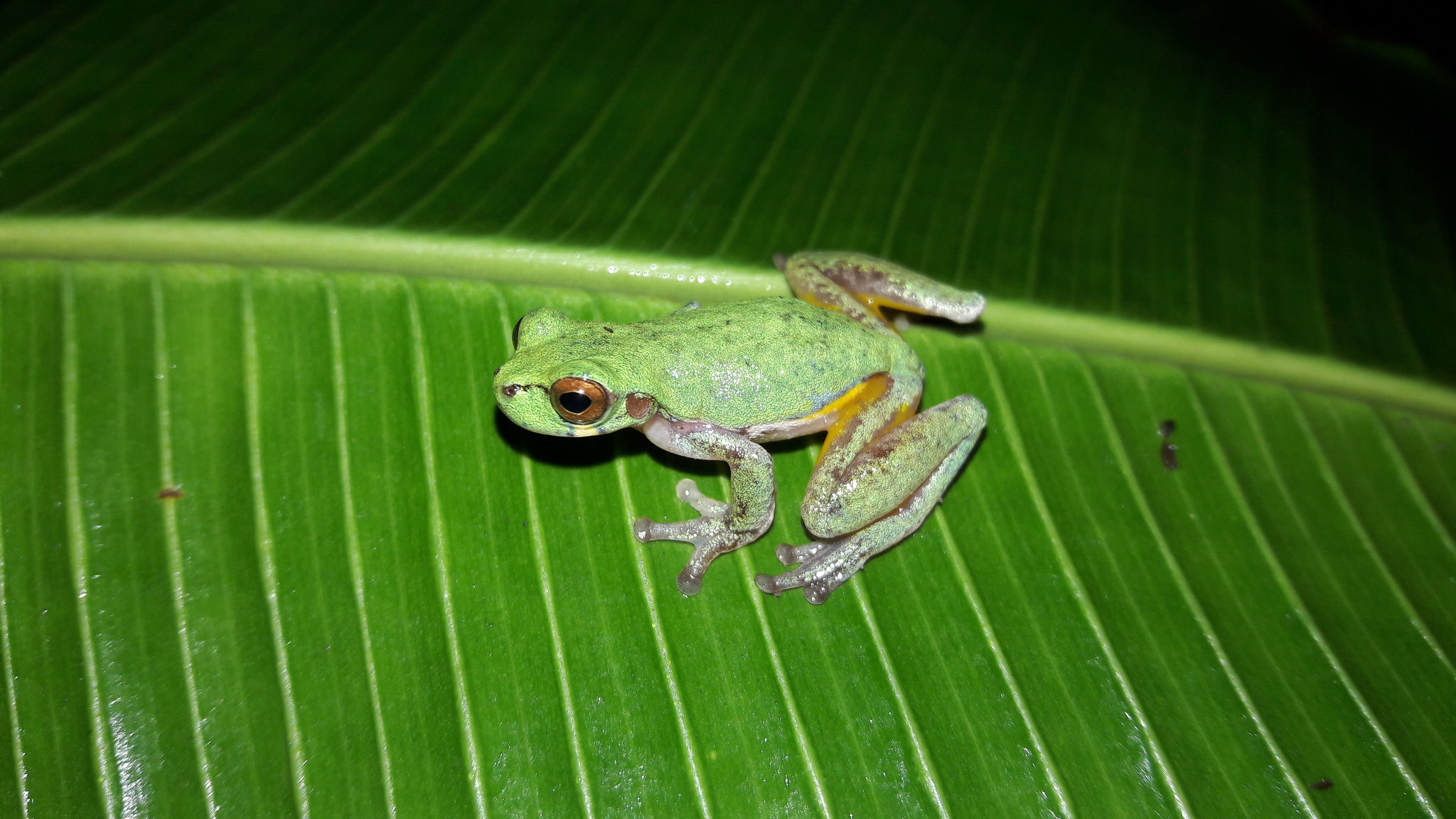
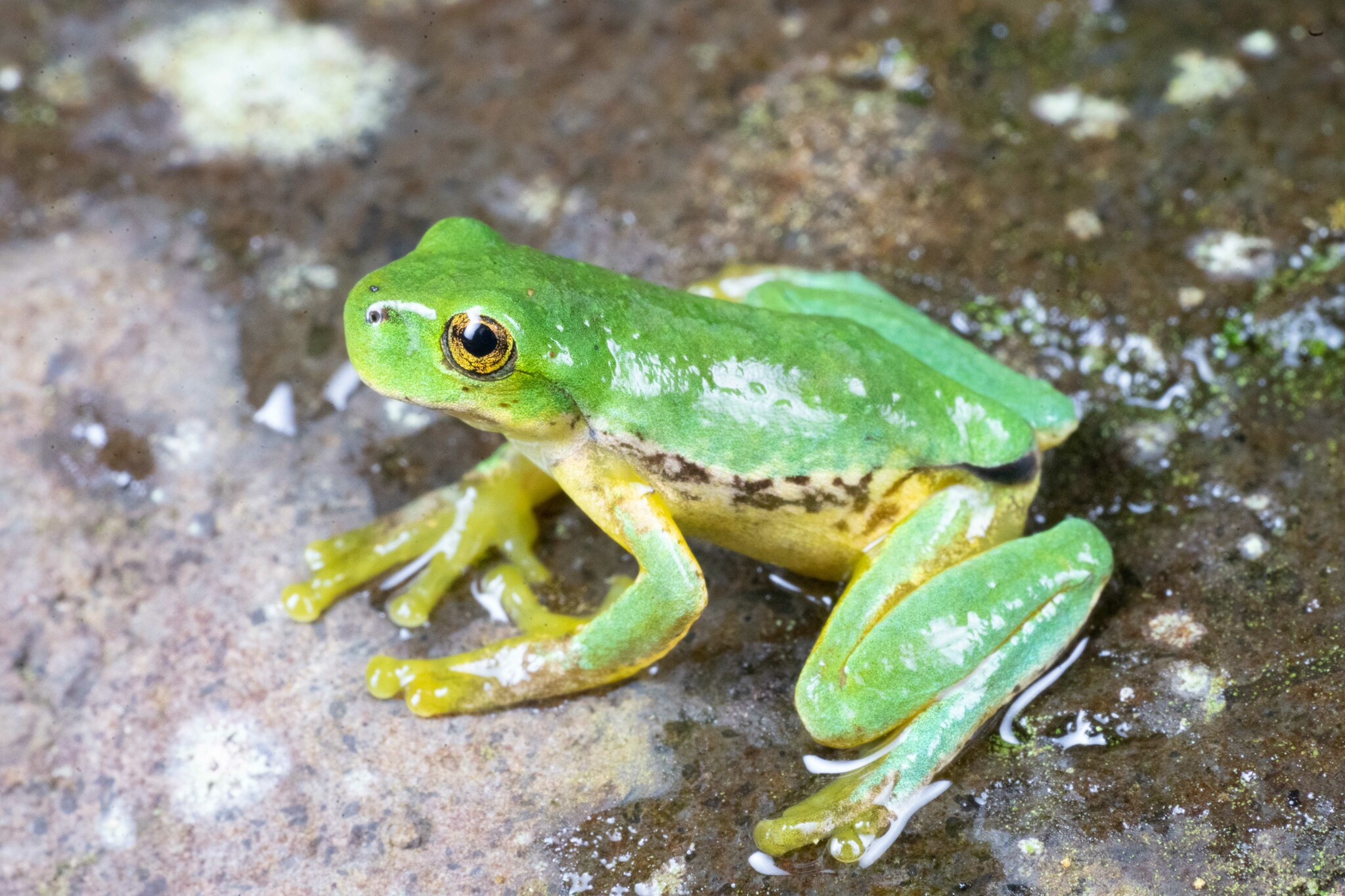
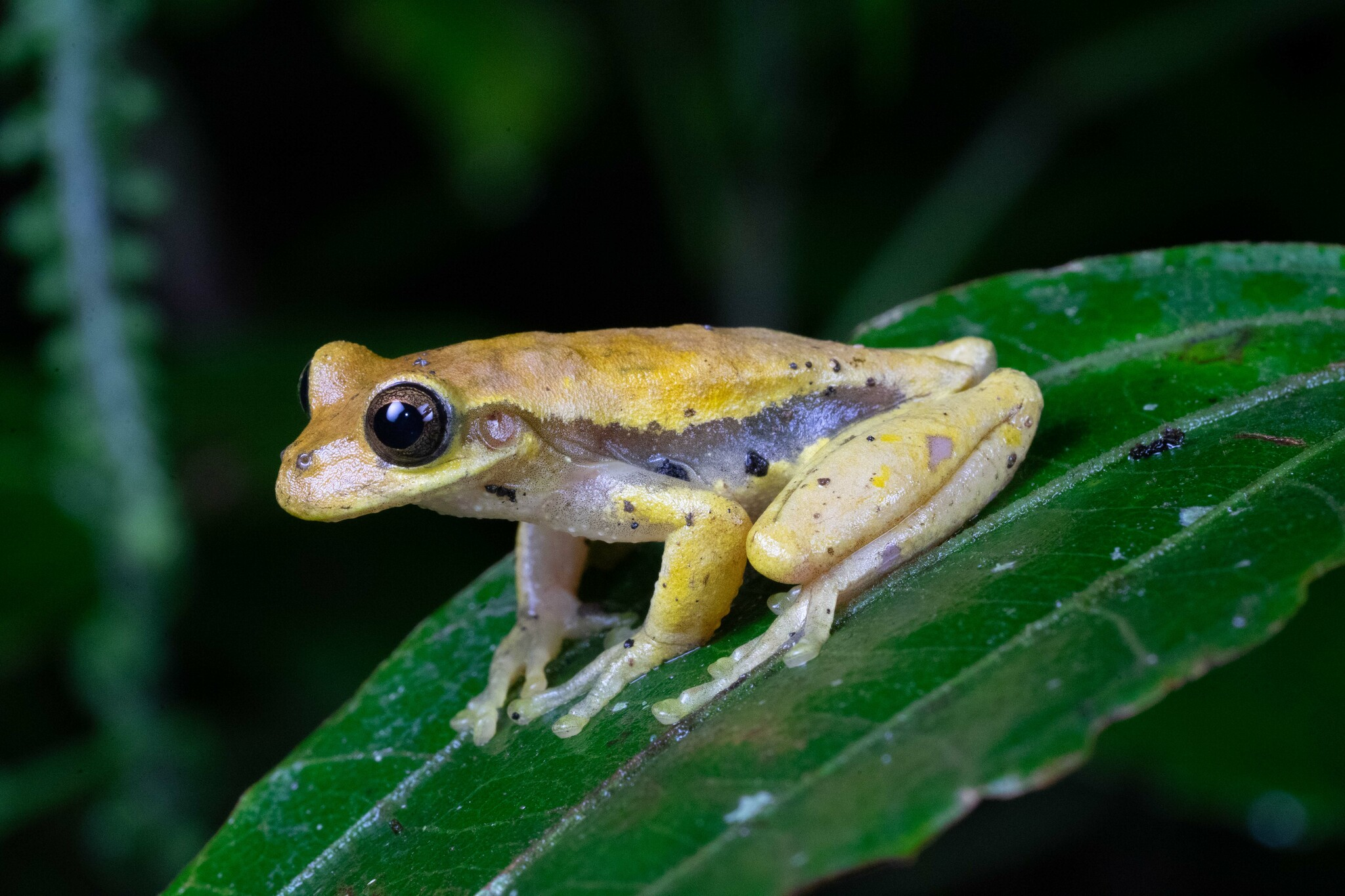
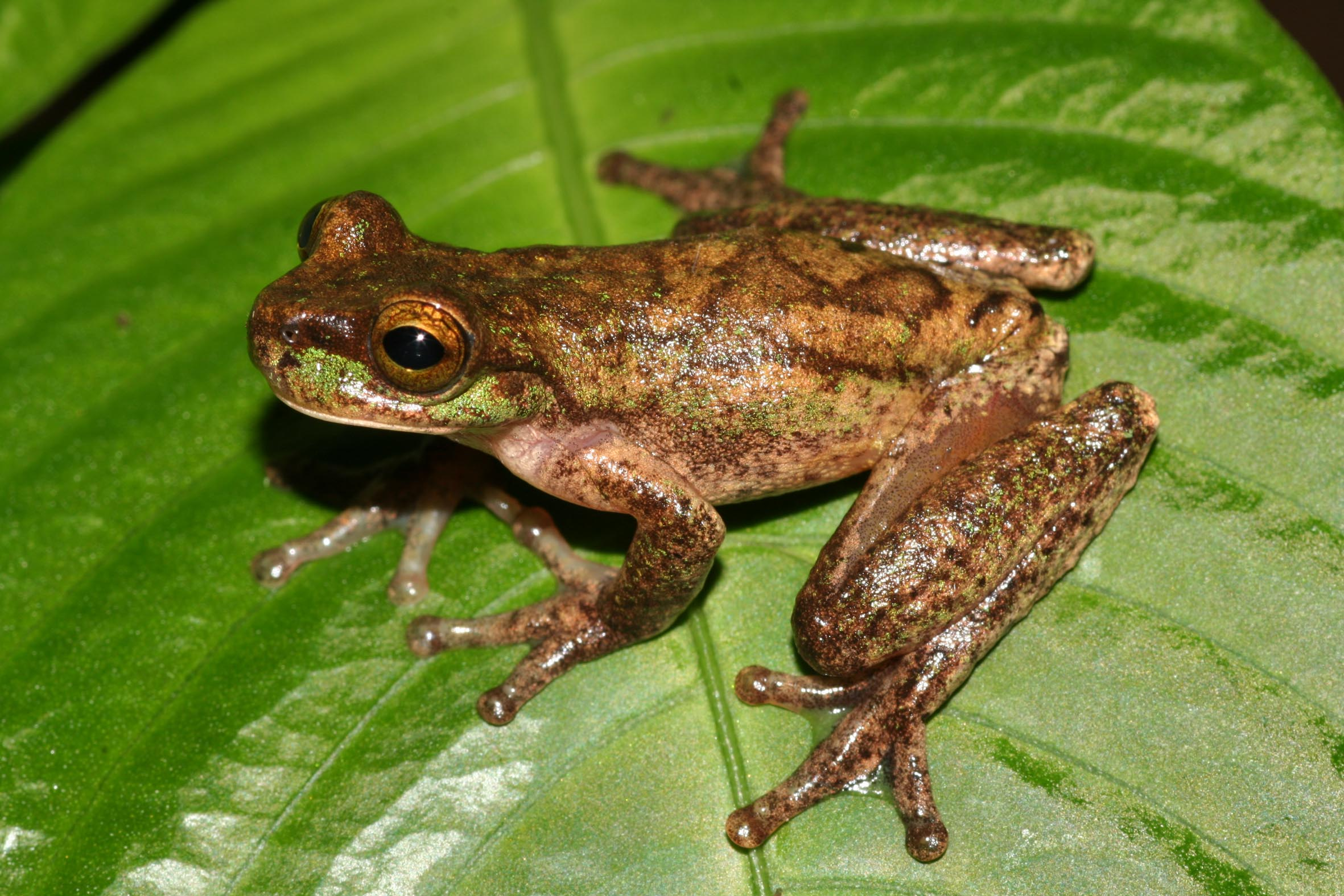
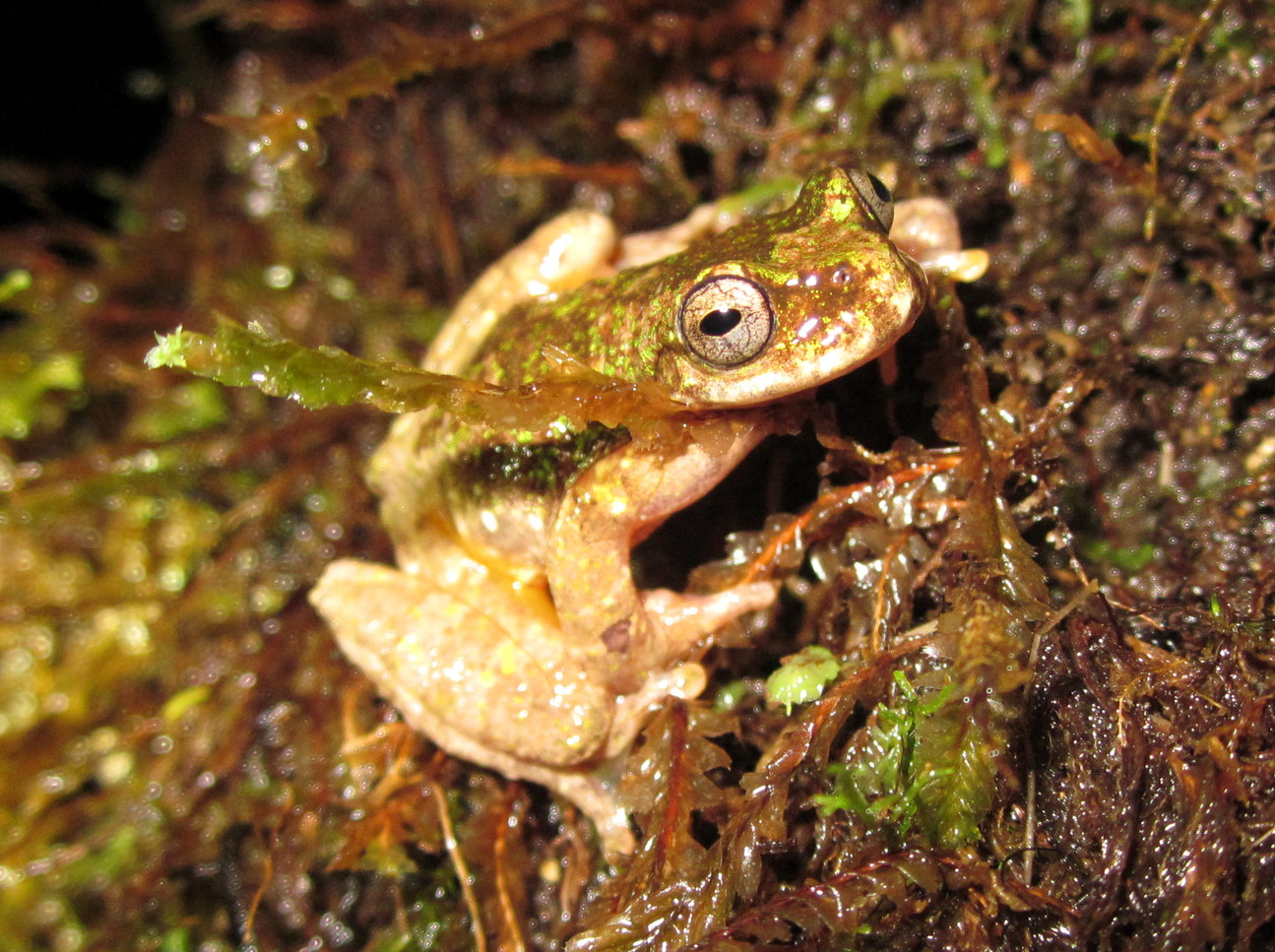
Image	Binomial name and author	Common name
	Isthmohyla angustilineata (Taylor, 1952)	narrow-lined tree frog
	Isthmohyla calypsa (Lips, 1996)
	Isthmohyla debilis (Taylor, 1952)	Isla Bonita tree frog
	Isthmohyla graceae (Myers and Duellman, 1982)	Continental Divide tree frog
	Isthmohyla infucata (Duellman, 1968)
	Isthmohyla insolita (McCranie, Wilson, and Williams, 1993)
	Isthmohyla lancasteri (Barbour, 1928)	Lancaster's tree frog
	Isthmohyla picadoi (Dunn, 1937)	Volcan Barba tree frog
	Isthmohyla pictipes (Cope, 1875)	Pico Blanco tree frog
	Isthmohyla pseudopuma (Günther, 1901)	Gunther's Costa Rican tree frog
	Isthmohyla rivularis (Taylor, 1952)	American cinchona plantation tree frog
	Isthmohyla tica (Starrett, 1966)	Starrett's tree frog
	Isthmohyla xanthosticta (Duellman, 1968)	South Fork tree frog
	Isthmohyla zeteki (Gaige, 1929)	Zetek's tree frog
