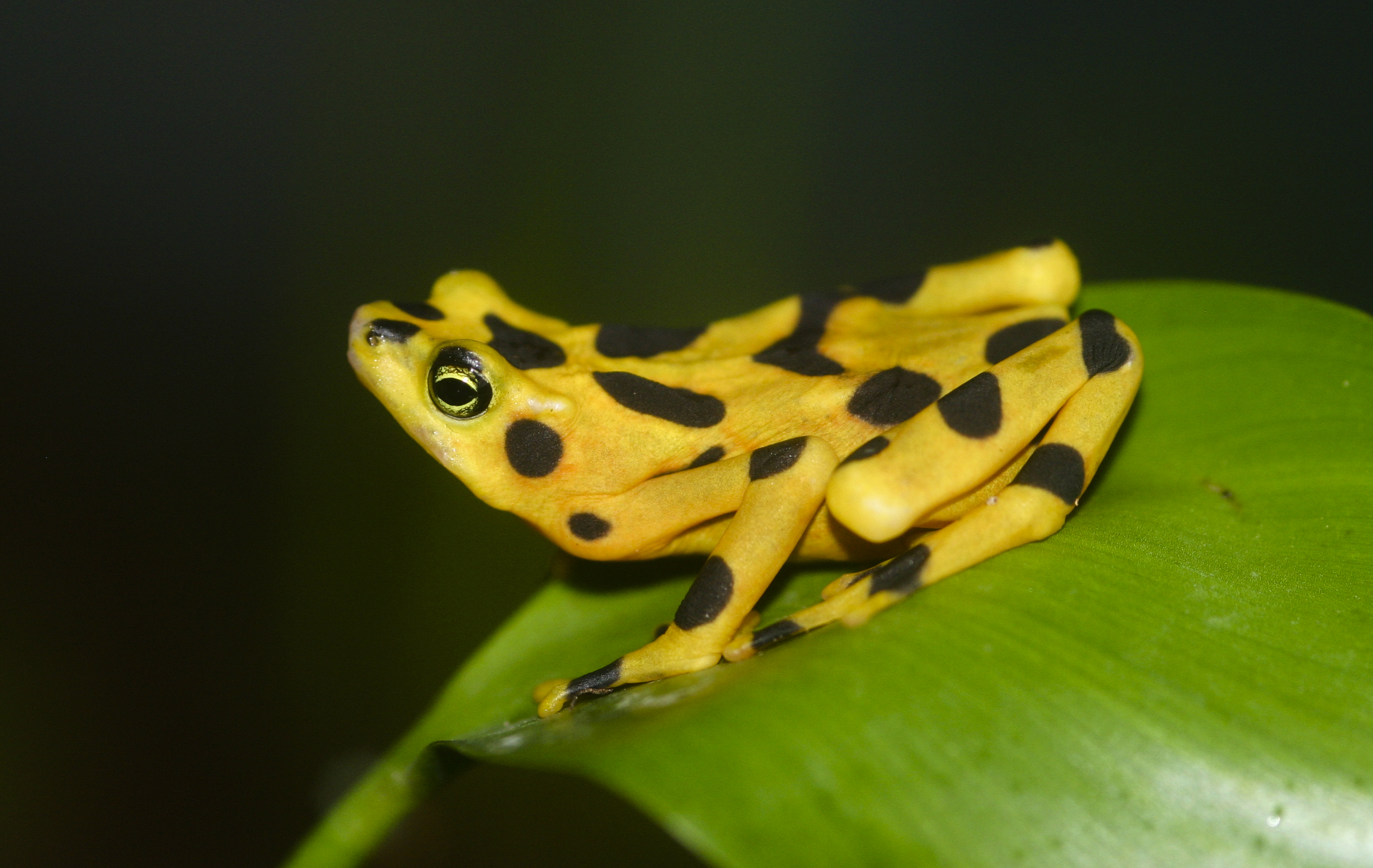
- At Smithsonian's National Zoo, Washington, D.C.

Conservation status
- Critically endangered, possibly extinct in the wild (IUCN 3.1)
- CITES Appendix I

Scientific classification
- Kingdom: Animalia
- Phylum: Chordata
- Class: Amphibia
- Order: Anura
- Family: Bufonidae
- Genus: Atelopus
- Species: A. zeteki

Binomial name
- Atelopus zeteki Dunn, 1933

Synonyms
- Atelopus varius zeteki Dunn, 1933

= Panamanian golden frog =

Species of amphibian

The Panamanian golden frog (Atelopus zeteki), also known as the Panamanian golden toad, Zetek's golden frog, and Cerro Campana stubfoot toad and other names, (Note: Other common names include Golden frog, Golden arrow poison frog, Zetek's frog, and Zetek's golden frog.) is a species of toad endemic to Panama. Panamanian golden frogs inhabit the streams along the mountainous slopes of the Cordilleran cloud forests of west-central Panama. While the IUCN lists it as Critically Endangered, it may in fact have been extinct in the wild since 2007. Individuals have been collected for breeding in captivity in a bid to preserve the species.

== Description ==
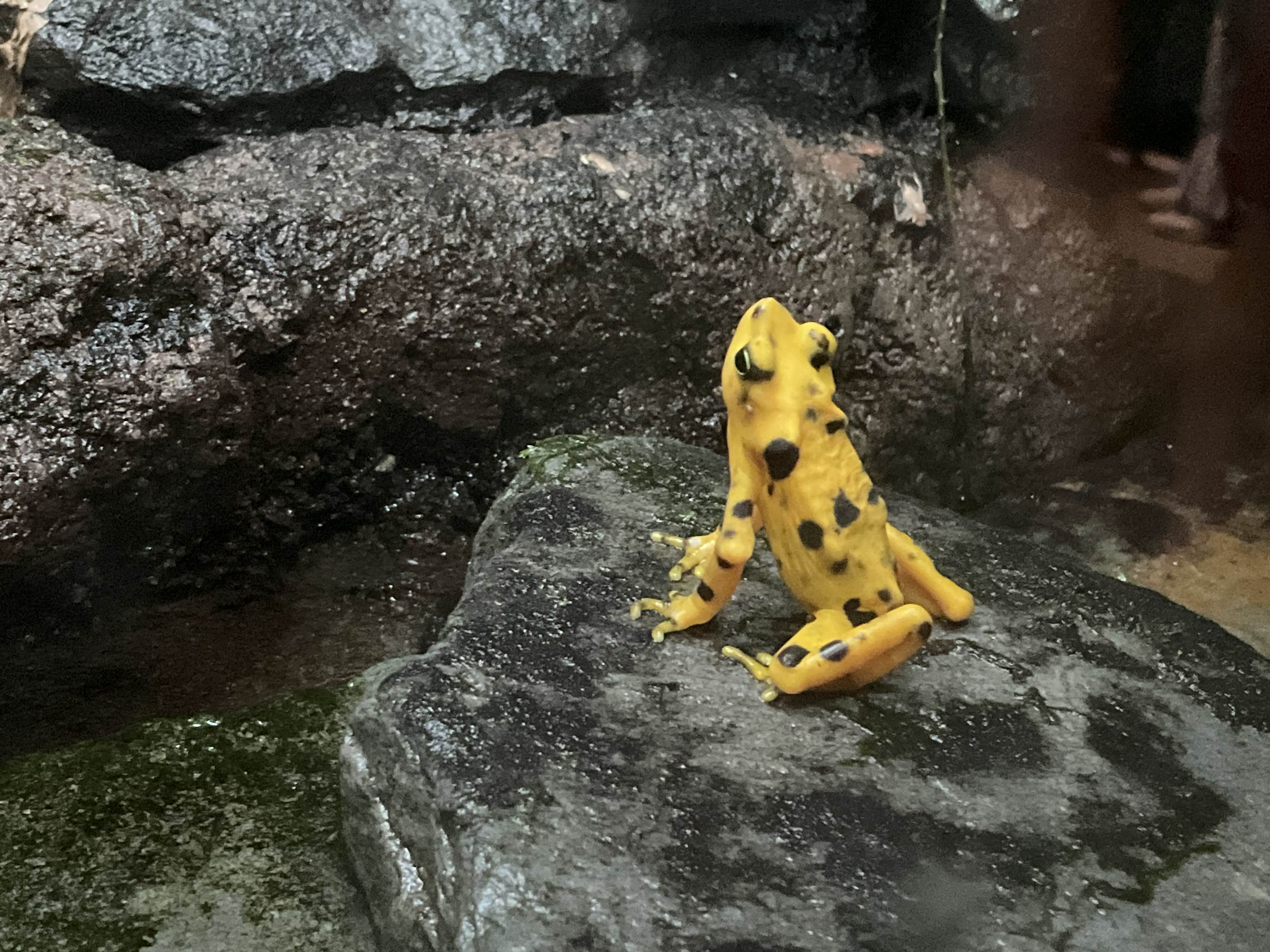
At the Vancouver Aquarium

Despite its common name, the Panamanian golden frog is a true toad, a member of the family Bufonidae. It was first described as a subspecies of Atelopus varius, but is now classified as a separate species.

The Panamanian golden frog is a national symbol and is considered to be one of the most beautiful frogs in Panama. The skin colour ranges from light yellow-green to bright gold, with some individuals exhibiting black spots on their backs and legs. Females are generally larger than males; females typically range from 45 to 63 mm (1.8 to 2.5 in) in length and 4 to 15 g (0.14 to 0.53 oz) in weight, with males between 35 and 48 millimetres (1.4 and 1.9 in) in length and 3 and 12 grams (0.11 and 0.42 oz) in weight.

=== Toxicity ===
The Panamanian golden frog has a variety of toxins, including steroidal bufadienolides and guanidinium alkaloids of the tetrodotoxin class. One of the latter, zetekitoxin AB, has been found to be a blocker of voltage-dependent sodium channels several orders of magnitude more potent than its analog saxitoxin. Their toxin is water-soluble and affects the nerve cells of anyone who comes in contact with it. Panamanian golden frogs use this toxin to protect themselves from most predators. Due to the risk of testing the poison on humans, it has been done with mice. Large doses can be fatal in 20 or 30 minutes. Death is preceded by clonic (grand mal) convulsions until the functions of the circulatory and respiratory systems cease.

== Distribution ==
The Panamanian golden frog is endemic to Panama, living close to mountain streams on the eastern side of the Tabasará mountain range in the Coclé and Panamá provinces. Its geographic range previously extended as far east as the town of El Copé in western Coclé Province before the onset of the fungal disease chytridiomycosis, which caused the El Copé population to rapidly collapse in 2004. Vital habitat is lost each year to small farms, commercialized agriculture, woodlot operations, livestock range, industrial expansion, and real estate development. Individuals are kept in captive-breeding programmes in more than 50 institutions across North America and Panama.

== Ecology ==
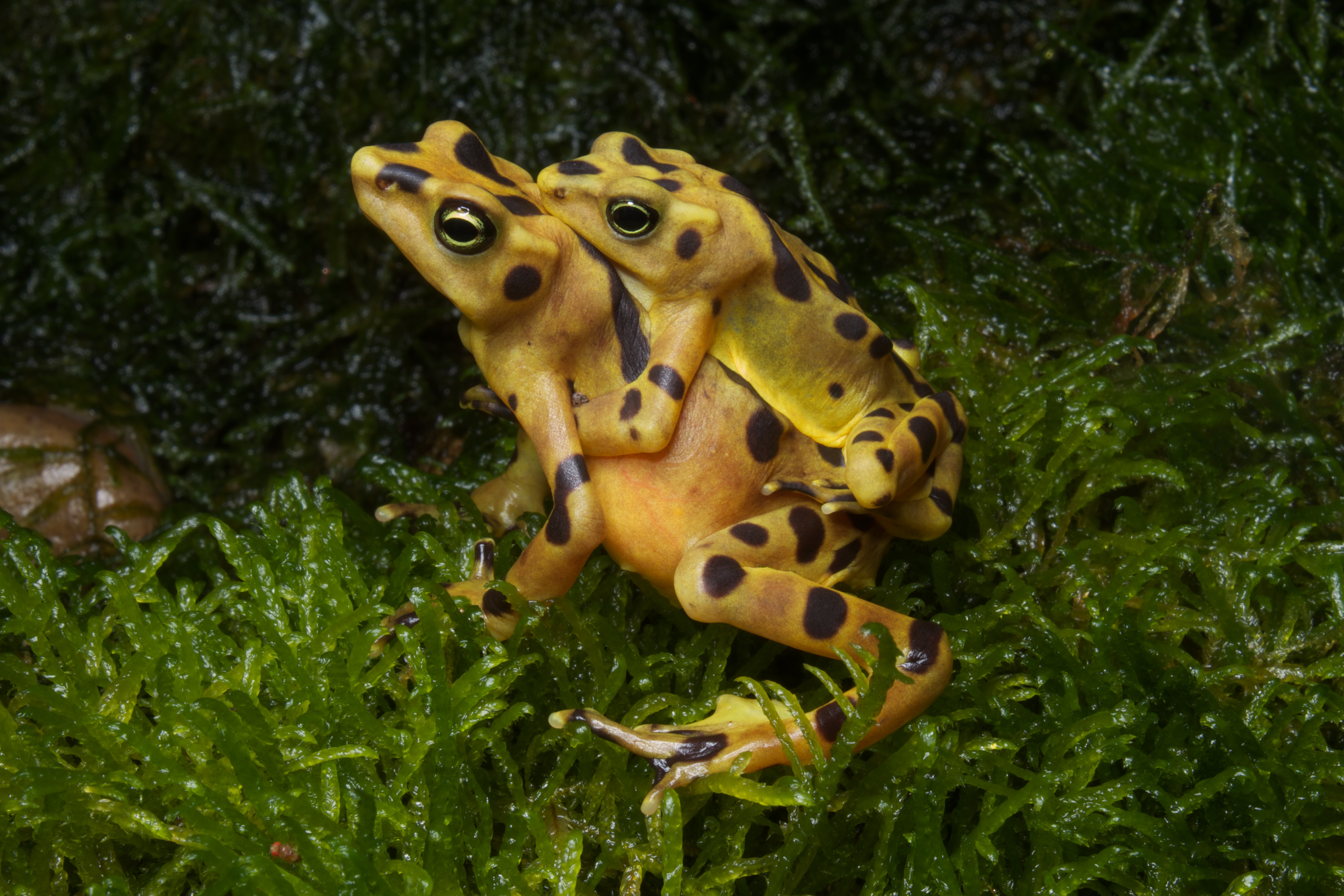
Panamanian golden frogs mating

The lifespan of the Panamanian golden frog is 12 years. This toad is unusual in that it communicates by a form of semaphore, waving at rivals and prospective mates, in addition to the sounds more usual among frogs. This adaptation is thought to have evolved in the Panamanian golden frog because of the noise of the fast-moving streams which formed its natural habitat. The male tends to stay near the streams where breeding occurs, while in the nonbreeding season, the female retreats into the forests. The male uses a soft call to entice prospective mates, then grabs the female and hangs on when she crosses his path. If she is receptive, she will tolerate amplexus; if not, she will attempt to buck him off by arching her spine. Amplexus can last from a few days to a few months, with oviposition usually taking place in a shallow stream.

=== Life history ===
The development of A. zeteki can be divided into four stages: larva or tadpole, juvenile, subadult, and adult. During the larval stage, individuals emerge from their eggs after 2 to 10 days of development. They are entirely aquatic creatures at this stage and are found in waters with a temperature range from 20.4 to 21.3 °C (68.7 to 70.3 °F) and with depths of 5 to 35 cm (2.0 to 14 in). After emerging, they mostly spend time resting in shallow pools below cascades. This behavior is similar to A. certus. Wherever water pools in a stream, they are likely to be found, as long as it is connected to moving channels. The tadpoles, however, do not venture into the moving channels. Clinging to surfaces by suction of their flattened bellies, the larvae can be characterized as gastromyzophorous. They are typically around 5.8 mm in length and 4.3 mm in width. Their snouts are rounded, as well as their tails. The longest caudal fins on their tails are about three-fifths the length of the tail. Their mouths are large and ventral surrounded by labia which form an unbroken oral disc about 3.6 mm wide. The posterior lip has no papillae, but other lips are lined with single rows of small, blunt papillae. They are colored from dark brown to black dorsally, with golden flecks on their bodies. They develop this black and gold coloration as melanin floods their dermal layers, giving the larvae protection from the sun. When metamorphosing, their golden flecks are replaced with dark green ones. The tadpoles feed on algae and spend 6 to 7 months developing and growing.

The juveniles of this species are amphibious, but have a far smaller range than subadults and adults. Normally, the juveniles are not found more than 2 m from their streams, and recently metamorphosed juveniles are more likely to be found next to the stream pools teeming with tadpoles. Like their adult counterparts, the juveniles go to higher elevations and recede into trees to prevent predation; however, due to their small size, the juveniles are not able to cover as much elevation and climb as highly into trees and shrubbery. At the onset of heavy and consistent rains, the juveniles flee from the open streamsides, which are normally where the grown adult males, which are very territorial, are known to roam. Territorial behaviors by adult males could be initiated by these rains. Visually, the juvenile has snout-to-vent lengths ranging from 8.4 to 17.1 mm. Their dorsal coloration is a deep and vivid green which matches the color of the moss that grows on the rocks in and around the streams of their habitat. There are also dark brown to black dorsal markings. Some of the juveniles are also known to have small dark markings on their digits. Their abdomen is either white or goldenrod yellow, occasionally with dark markings that do not match the ground color.

The subadults of this species have full ranges, but they are sometimes found near adult males which is noteworthy because males of this species are fairly solitary and combative in the presence of other males. The subadult is about 28.3 mm (1.1 in) long and weights about 1.1 g. They are more greenish in color which more closely resembles the color of the metamorphic juvenile than the brilliant and sometimes spotted golden color of the adult. The patterning of subadults is significantly darker than the adults.

=== Behavior ===
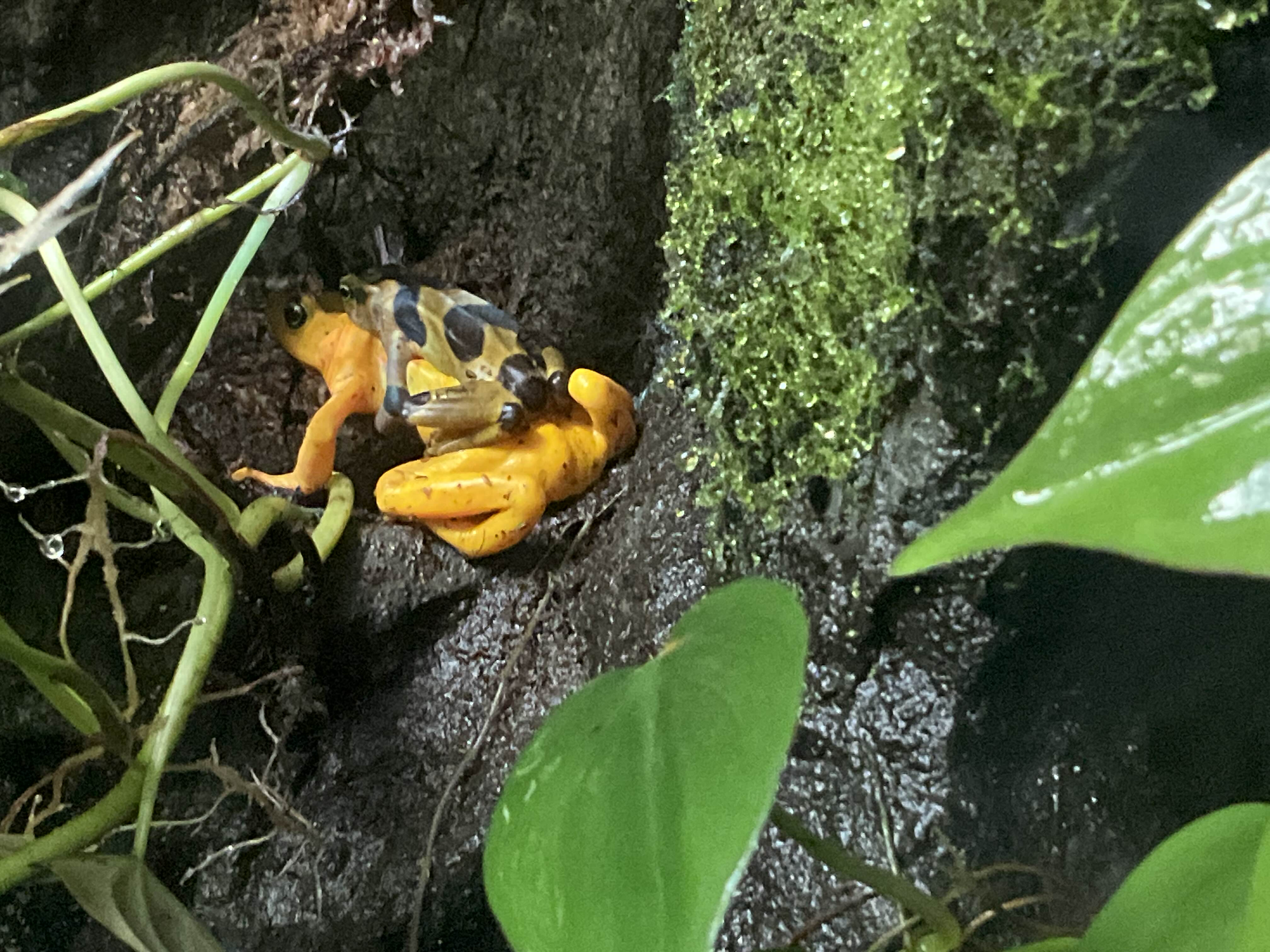
Amplexus, Vancouver Aquarium

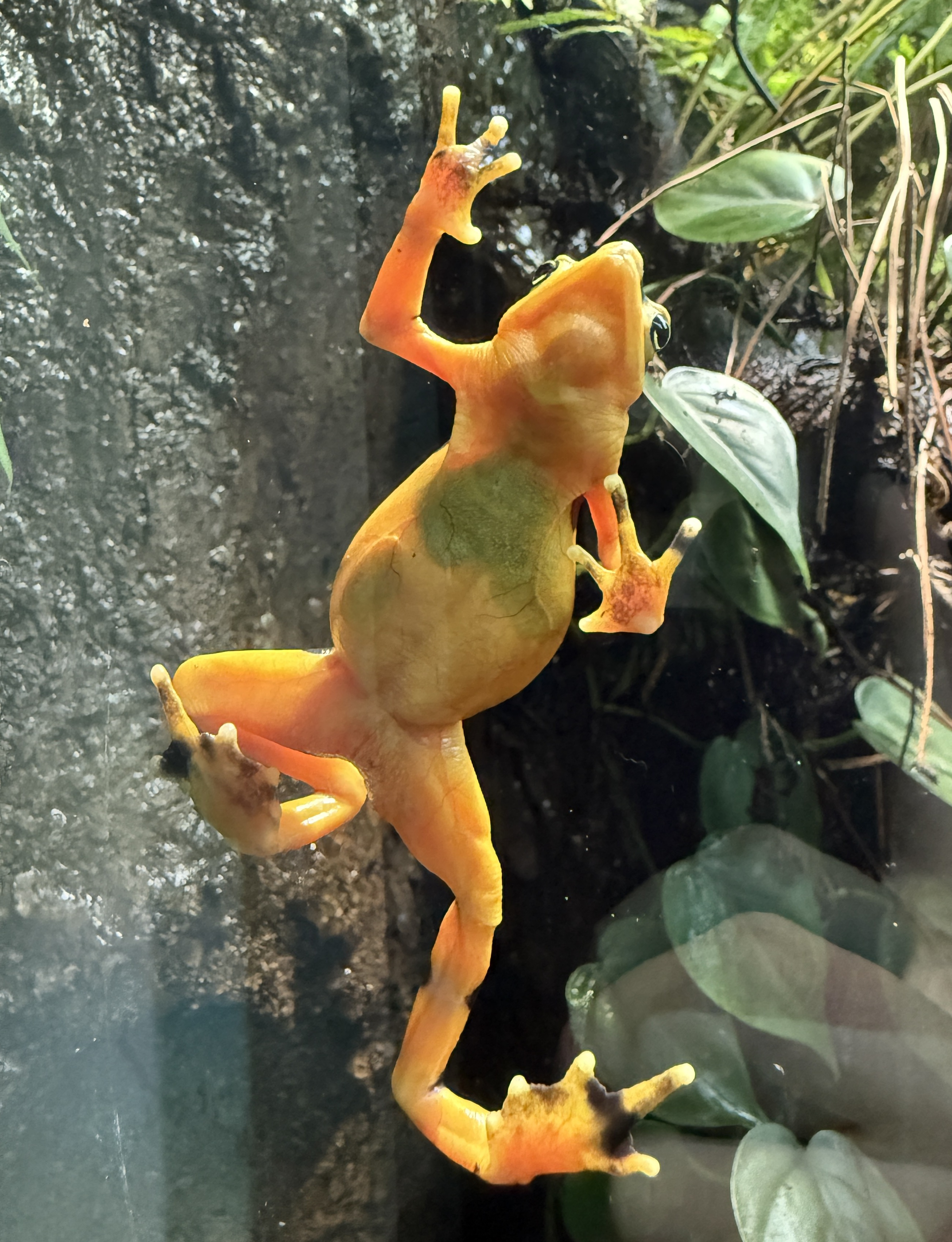
Climbing vertical glass, Vancouver Aquarium

The Panamanian golden frog appears to socialize with other amphibians using sounds from the throat and hand-waving, like the semaphore motion used in courtship. The movements may be friendly or aggressive warnings. It is an "earless" species of frog, meaning it lacks tympanum. This, however, does not inhibit its ability to communicate with other members of its species through throat sounds. Despite lacking eardrums, the "earless" frog responds to vocalizations produced by members of its own species. The male frog responds to a pulsed vocalization, characterized by lower frequencies followed by higher frequencies, and so on, by exhibiting antagonistic behaviors such as turning to face the source of the sound and producing a pulsed vocalization in response. The pulsed call is used to demonstrate male position during combative situations. Like Atelopus varius, it is very territorial, living in the same site most of its life. As a result of this site fidelity, it will not hesitate to vocalize when another male frog encroaches on its territory. If this is not enough to get the intruder away, the frog is not hesitant to defend its territory through aggressive behavior. When encountering another male, male frogs will wave their forefeet as a sign of defense.

The Panamanian golden frog, apart from recognizing sounds, is also able to locate the origin of a sound. This means it is capable of directional hearing. In all other species of frogs, the role of the eardrum is to pinpoint the direction of sound. Due to the very small size of the Panamanian golden frog, it is difficult to imagine another system of hearing that does not involve an eardrum apparatus.

When A. zeteki encounters a predator, it often waves and lifts its foot at the predator to call attention to its stunning and beautiful coloring. This coloring is a warning of its toxicity, which is enough to make a predator no longer consider the frog as a meal. If the predator continues to approach, undeterred by the frog's warnings about its toxicity, the foot waving, often accompanied with vocalizations, will continue and increase in frequency and volume. Its toxicity is not a foolproof method of protection, since some animals, such as the colubrid snake Erythrolamprus epinephalus, are able to metabolize the frogs' poison. Ways to ward off predators and prevent predation are different in their diurnal habits versus their nocturnal ones, especially because the poison alone will not ward off every predator. Adult males, which are active on the ground during the day, recede into the trees and perch there at night. This is most likely a defense mechanism. If the predator is approaching at night, the frog cannot rely on a visual strategy for fleeing. They perch on trees because it gives them the advantage of hearing approaching predators or feeling their weight on the tree branch. The noise and tactile advantages of climbing a tree are better than the advantages of burrowing in the ground.

== Conservation ==
The Panamanian golden frog began vanishing from its high mountain forests in the late 1990s, prompting a scientific investigation and rescue process that continues today. It was filmed for the last time in the wild in 2006 by the BBC Natural History Unit for the series Life in Cold Blood by David Attenborough. The remaining few specimens were taken into captivity and the location of filming was kept secret to protect them from potential poachers. Although captive populations seem to thrive well, reintroducing them to an area will not stop the threat of chytridiomycosis. No current remedies prevent or control the disease in the wild, but efforts are being made. One attempt was made to protect a wide variety of frogs from the disease by using the bacterium Janthinobacterium lividum that produces a chemical against the infections; however, the skin of Panamanian golden frogs was unsuitable for the bacterium used. The San Diego Zoo started a conservation effort and received their first frogs in 2003. Since then, they have been able to successfully breed 500 individuals in captivity but will not release them into the wild until the fungal disease is less of a threat. The San Diego zoo also sends money to Panama to keep up the conservation effort in the frogs' native country.

Populations of amphibians, including the Panamanian golden frog, suffered major declines possibly due to the fungal infection chytridiomycosis. The infection is caused by an invasive fungal pathogen that reached El Valle, the home of the Panamanian golden frog, in 2006. Additional factors, such as habitat loss and pollution, may have also played a role.

The temperature at which these amphibians keep may be correlated to chytridiomycosis; the fungus is more prevalent in colder conditions. If a cold period occurs, the behavior and immunity of the frogs may change around the same time more spores are released. When these frogs are infected with the fungus, their body temperatures rise to fight off the fungus. However, even if the infection leaves the frogs and body temperatures return to previous normal levels, the infection can re-emerge. Another study found that dry conditions added an average 25 days to the lifespan of infected individuals, while higher temperatures only added 4 days.

Not only do these frogs face the threat of the fungal disease, but they also are threatened by human development. As trees are cleared for housing and urbanization, the habitat of A. zeteki is destroyed. Other threats include encroachment by agriculture, pollution, pet trade, and aquaculture.

Project Golden Frog is a conservation project involving scientific, educational, and zoological institutions in the Republic of Panama and the United States. The intended outcomes of this project include a greater understanding of the Panamanian golden frog, a coordinated conservation effort by governmental agencies and nongovernmental organizations, heightened awareness of current global amphibian declines, greater respect for wildlife among Panamanians and global citizens, and greater land preservation for threatened and endangered species throughout the world. This organization will use education and field studies, producing offspring through the already captive frogs, and offering financial support to help preserve these frogs.

Two significant efforts to save these frogs have been made. The Amphibian Recovery Conservation Coalition, which started in 2004, exported the endangered amphibians to the US, believing it was a better environment for the endangered species. In 2005, the Houston Zoo established the El Valle Amphibian Conservation Center (EVACC) in Panama, so the endangered frogs could have protected facilities in their native country. EVACC has become a tourist attraction and the populations of the housed species are watched closely by researchers.

In early 2006, EVACC exceeded its capacity for housing golden frogs. In order to continue collection efforts, a partnership was formed with the Hotel Campestre in El Valle whereby rooms 28 and 29 of the resort were loaded with terrariums as a stop-gap measure. This was one of several conservation efforts covered in Elizabeth Kolbert's The Sixth Extinction: An Unnatural History. Over 300 frogs were kept in the so-called "golden frog hotel" and treated to daily cleansing rinses, 24-hour room service, and exotic lunches of specialty crickets until space could be made available in the EVACC.

=== Experiment ===
Prior to the spread of the Batrachochytrium dendrobatidis fungus into Panamanian golden frog habitat, conservation organizations collected Panamanian golden frogs and placed them in captive survival assurance colonies. The skin of amphibians is host to a diverse resident bacterial community, which acts as a defense mechanism in some amphibians to inhibit pathogens. Researchers characterized the bacterial community from wild and captive Panamanian golden frogs originating from the same population with sequencing to assess how long-term captivity has affected this community. Species richness, phylogenetic diversity, and community structure of the skin microbiota were found to be significantly different between wild and captive Panamanian golden frogs. However, after approximately eight years of living in captivity, the offspring of the original captive Panamanian golden frogs still shared 70% of their microbial community with wild frogs. These results demonstrate that host-associated microbial communities can be significantly altered by captive management, but most of the community composition can be preserved.

Reintroduction efforts from captive assurance colonies are unlikely to be successful without the development of methods to control chytridiomycosis in the wild. Researchers have experimented by using Janthinobacterium lividum to control the skin temperature in hopes the fungus would be kept at bay. It seemed to be a protective treatment at the early stage, but the frogs began to die after two weeks as the Batrachochytrium dendrobatidis is the causative agent of chytridiomycosis. Other methods of focusing on the phenotypic and genetic concordance to do the conservation have been used. Researchers designated A. varius and A. zeteki as separate species, but they are poorly sorted based on physical characteristics, and better sorted based on mitochondrial DNA.

== In culture ==
The Panamanian golden frog is something of a national symbol, appearing on state lottery tickets and in local mythology. When the toad dies, it is thought to turn to gold and to bring good luck to those fortunate enough to see it. This belief originated from golden and clay talismans (huacas) that were carved by Pre-Columbian Indigenous people to resemble the golden frog. In 2010, the Panamanian government passed legislation recognizing August 14 as "National Golden Frog Day". The main celebration event is marked annually by a parade in the streets of El Valle de Anton, and a display of Panamanian golden frogs at the El Valle Amphibian Conservation Center in the El Nispero Zoo, El Valle. The highly toxic skin of the frog has also been used for centuries by the native people of the Panamanian forests for arrow poison.

== See also ==
- Decline in amphibian populations
- Holocene extinction
- Ecnomiohyla rabborum
- Golden toad
