= Isthmohyla xanthosticta =

Conservation status
- Data Deficient (IUCN 3.1)

Scientific classification
- Kingdom: Animalia
- Phylum: Chordata
- Class: Amphibia
- Order: Anura
- Family: Hylidae
- Genus: Isthmohyla
- Species: I. xanthosticta

Binomial name
- Isthmohyla xanthosticta (Duellman, 1968)

Synonyms
- Hyla xanthosticta Duellman, 1968

Species of amphibian

Isthmohyla xanthosticta is a species of frogs in the family Hylidae. It is endemic to Costa Rica and only known from its type locality on the south slope of Volcan Barba in the Heredia Province. Common name south fork treefrog has been coined for it.

== Description ==
This species is known from the holotype, an adult female measuring 29 mm (1.1 in) in snout–vent length, and another specimen. The head is as wide as the body. The snout is moderately long and truncate. The tympanum is distinct but partly covered by the supra-tympanic fold. The forelimbs are moderately long and slender. The fingers bear large discs and are about one-fourth webbed. The hind limbs are moderately short and slender. The toes are about two-thirds webbed and bear discs that are slightly smaller than those on the fingers. The coloration is dorsally uniformly green, but the flanks and the thighs are brown with large yellow spots. There is a broad, bronze-tan canthal stripe. The throat and belly are pale yellow.

== Habitat and conservation ==
The holotype was found in lower montane rainforest at 2,100 m (6,900 ft) above sea level, perched on a leaf some 1 meter above the ground. The locality is within the Braulio Carrillo National Park. The habitat is pristine, and possible threats to this species could be chytridiomycosis, climate change, and airborne pollution.

Isthmohyla xanthosticta is only known from the Barva Volcano in Costa Rica
