= Pristimantis adnus =

Conservation status
- Near Threatened (IUCN 3.1)

Scientific classification
- Kingdom: Animalia
- Phylum: Chordata
- Class: Amphibia
- Order: Anura
- Family: Strabomantidae
- Genus: Pristimantis
- Species: P. adnus

Binomial name
- Pristimantis adnus Crawford, Ryan & Jaramillo, 2010

Species of amphibian

Pristimantis adnus is a species of frog in the family Strabomantidae. It is endemic to Panama and is only known from its type locality in Serranía del Sapo, Darién Province. The species was found while researchers were working on a way to save Panama's frogs from extinction from the deadly amphibian disease chytridiomycosis. The frog was collected in Panama's Darién Province in 2003 and described as a new species in 2010. The name of the species is a Latinized version of the Spanish term for DNA which is ADN.

== Description ==
Pristimantis adnus is known from two males. They were small frogs, measuring 19–20 mm (0.75–0.79 in) in snout–vent length, but reproductively mature. Their dorsum was shagreen with some scattered enlarged granules. They were found in the leaf litter during the day at elevations of about 700–800 m (2,300–2,600 ft) asl.
