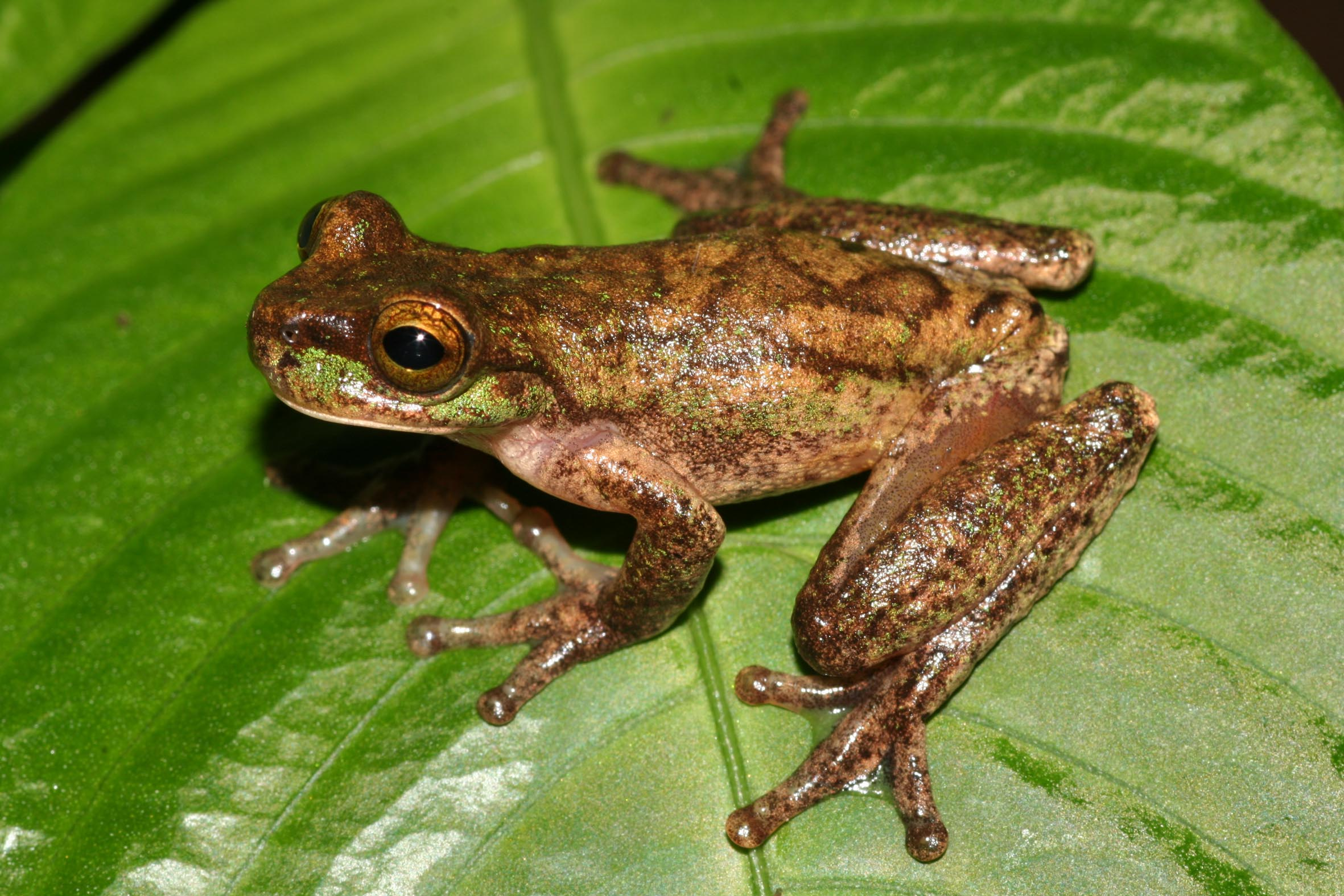

Conservation status
- Endangered (IUCN 3.1)

Scientific classification
- Kingdom: Animalia
- Phylum: Chordata
- Class: Amphibia
- Order: Anura
- Family: Hylidae
- Genus: Isthmohyla
- Species: I. rivularis

Binomial name
- Isthmohyla rivularis (Taylor, 1952)

Synonyms
- Hyla rivularis Taylor, 1952

= Isthmohyla rivularis =

Species of amphibian

Isthmohyla rivularis is a rare species of frog in the family Hylidae. It occurs in the cordilleras of Tilarán, Central, and Talamanca in Costa Rica as well as adjacent western Panama. The species was thought to already have become extinct, but in 2007, it was re-discovered in the Monteverde Cloud Forest of Costa Rica when a single male was found. In 2008, a gravid female and few males were spotted. The common name American Cinchona Plantation treefrog has been suggested for it.

== Description ==
Males grow to 34 mm (1.3 in) and females to 37 mm (1.5 in) in snout–vent length. The snout is moderately short and acutely rounded. The tympanum is barely discernible. The fingers have large discs and are up to one-third webbed. The toes have discs that are slightly smaller than those on the fingers and are two-thirds webbed. The dorsal color varies from grey to light brown. Most specimens have a thin, dark line running through the eye. Other dark markings are variably present. The flanks are usually yellowish, but may in some individuals appear greenish or bluish. The iris is bronze and has black reticulations.

== Habitat and conservation ==
Isthmohyla rivularis is found along or in clear streams in lower and premontane rainforests at 1,210 to 2,040 m (3,970 to 6,690 ft). Males call from vegetation by or overhanging fast-moving streams. The tadpoles develop in streams.

This species was formerly common in parts of its range, but has since strongly declined. The decline is probably caused by chytridiomycosis. Also habitat loss caused by agriculture and selective logging have impacted the species.
