= Isthmohyla infucata =

Conservation status
- Endangered (IUCN 3.1)

Scientific classification
- Kingdom: Animalia
- Phylum: Chordata
- Class: Amphibia
- Order: Anura
- Family: Hylidae
- Genus: Isthmohyla
- Species: I. infucata

Binomial name
- Isthmohyla infucata (Duellman, 2001)

Synonyms
- Hyla pseudopuma ssp. infucata Duellman, 1969

Species of amphibian

Isthmohyla infucata is a species of frog in the family Hylidae endemic to Panama.

Its natural habitats are subtropical or tropical moist montane forests, freshwater marshes, and intermittent freshwater marshes. Infucata is threatened by habitat loss.
