= Pristimantis educatoris =

Scientific classification
- Domain: Eukaryota
- Kingdom: Animalia
- Phylum: Chordata
- Class: Amphibia
- Order: Anura
- Family: Strabomantidae
- Genus: Pristimantis
- Species: P. educatoris

Binomial name
- Pristimantis educatoris Ryan, Lips, and Giermakowski, 2010

Species of amphibian

Pristimantis educatoris is a species of frog in the family Strabomantidae. It is found in Costa Rica, Panama, and Colombia and is similar to—and prior to its description in 2010—confused with Pristimantis caryophyllaceus. The species was first found in 2002 while researchers were working on a way to save Panama's frogs from extinction from the deadly amphibian disease chytridiomycosis. The species was discovered in Omar Torrijos National Park in Coclé Province, Panama.

== Description ==
Pristimantis educatoris is a thin, long-limbed, small species of frog. Males measure 19–20 mm (0.75–0.79 in) in snout–vent length and females 21–37 mm (0.83–1.46 in). They have a relatively large head and big eyes. Their dorsal ground colour varies from light tan to medium brown.

The female guards her eggs that hatch as fully developed froglets, without free-lifing tadpole stage. Clutch size is about 20 eggs and development takes about 24–28 days.

Pristimantis educatoris occur in secondary forests with a well-developed understory of palms and herbaceous plants. They are active during the night and most often found perching on leaves about one metre above the ground.
