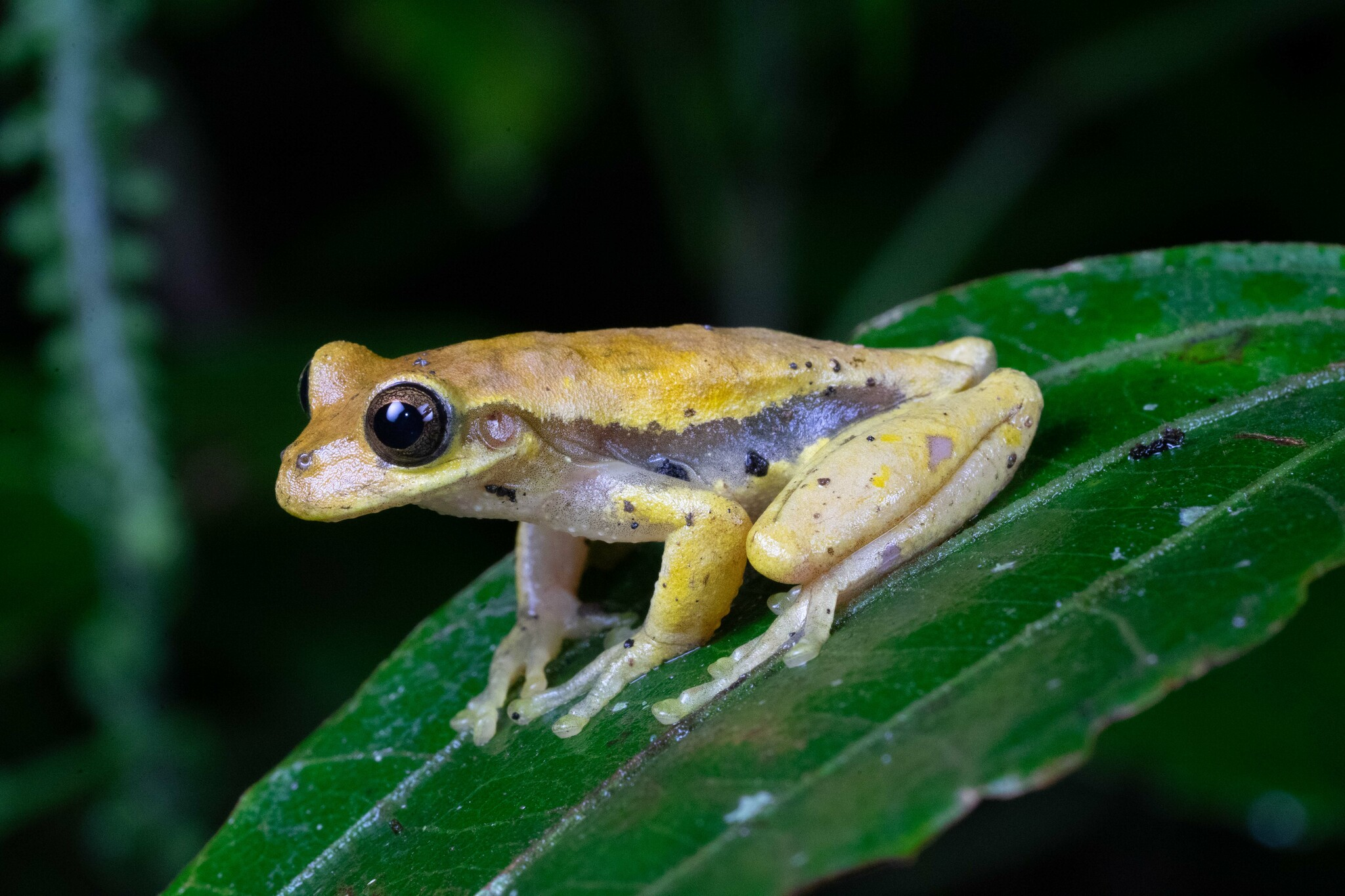

Conservation status
- Least Concern (IUCN 3.1)

Scientific classification
- Kingdom: Animalia
- Phylum: Chordata
- Class: Amphibia
- Order: Anura
- Family: Hylidae
- Genus: Isthmohyla
- Species: I. pseudopuma

Binomial name
- Isthmohyla pseudopuma (Günther, 1901)

= Isthmohyla pseudopuma =

Species of frog

Isthmohyla pseudopuma is a species of frog in the family Hylidae. It is found in Costa Rica and Panama. Its natural habitats are subtropical or tropical moist montane forests, intermittent freshwater marshes, pastureland, plantations, rural gardens, and heavily degraded former forest. It is threatened by habitat loss.
