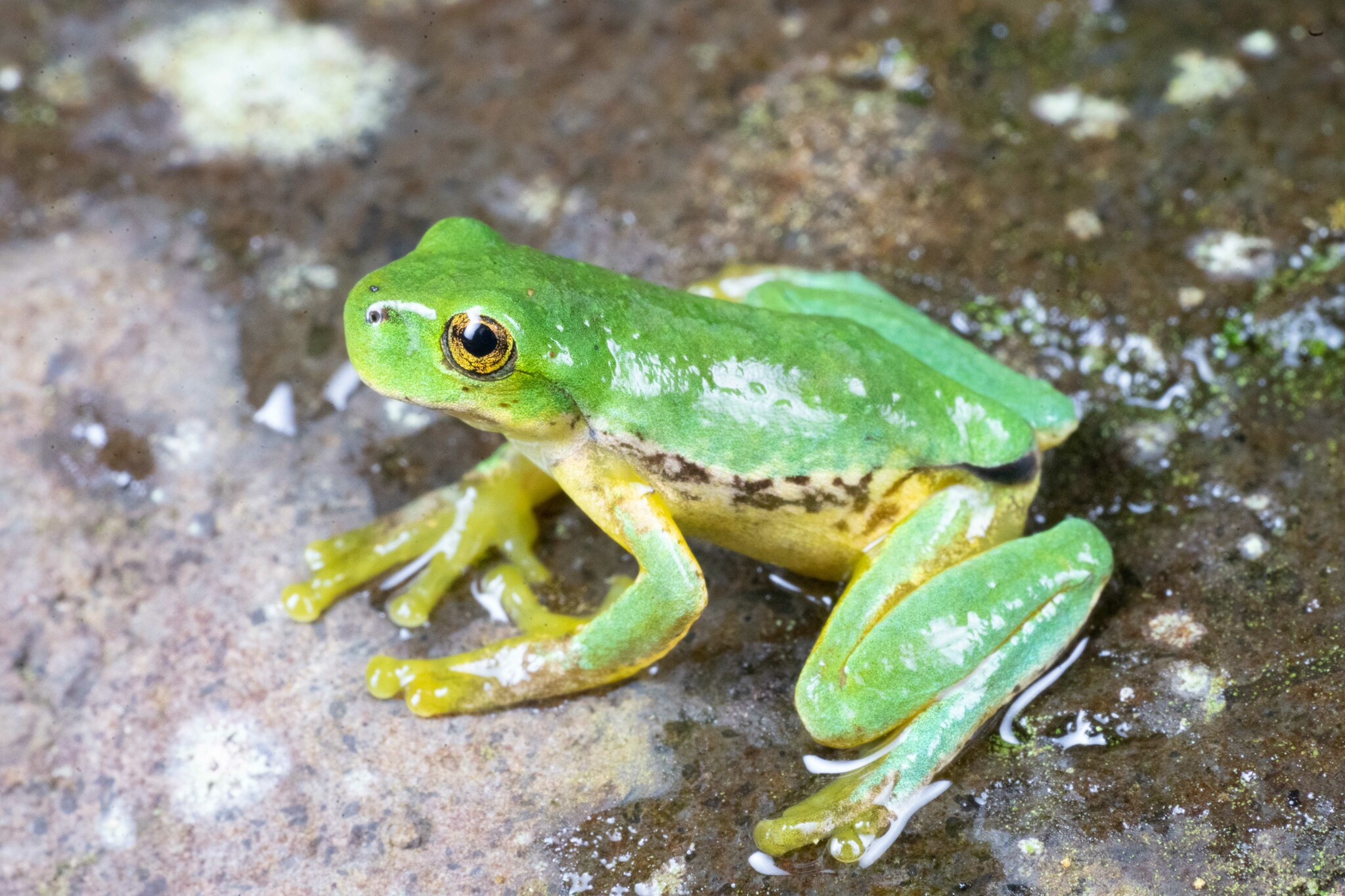

Conservation status
- Critically Endangered (IUCN 3.1)

Scientific classification
- Kingdom: Animalia
- Phylum: Chordata
- Class: Amphibia
- Order: Anura
- Family: Hylidae
- Genus: Isthmohyla
- Species: I. pictipes

Binomial name
- Isthmohyla pictipes (Cope, 1875)

= Isthmohyla pictipes =

Species of frog

Isthmohyla pictipes is a species of frog in the family Hylidae. It is found in Costa Rica and possibly Panama. Its natural habitats are subtropical or tropical moist montane forests and rivers. It is threatened by habitat loss.
