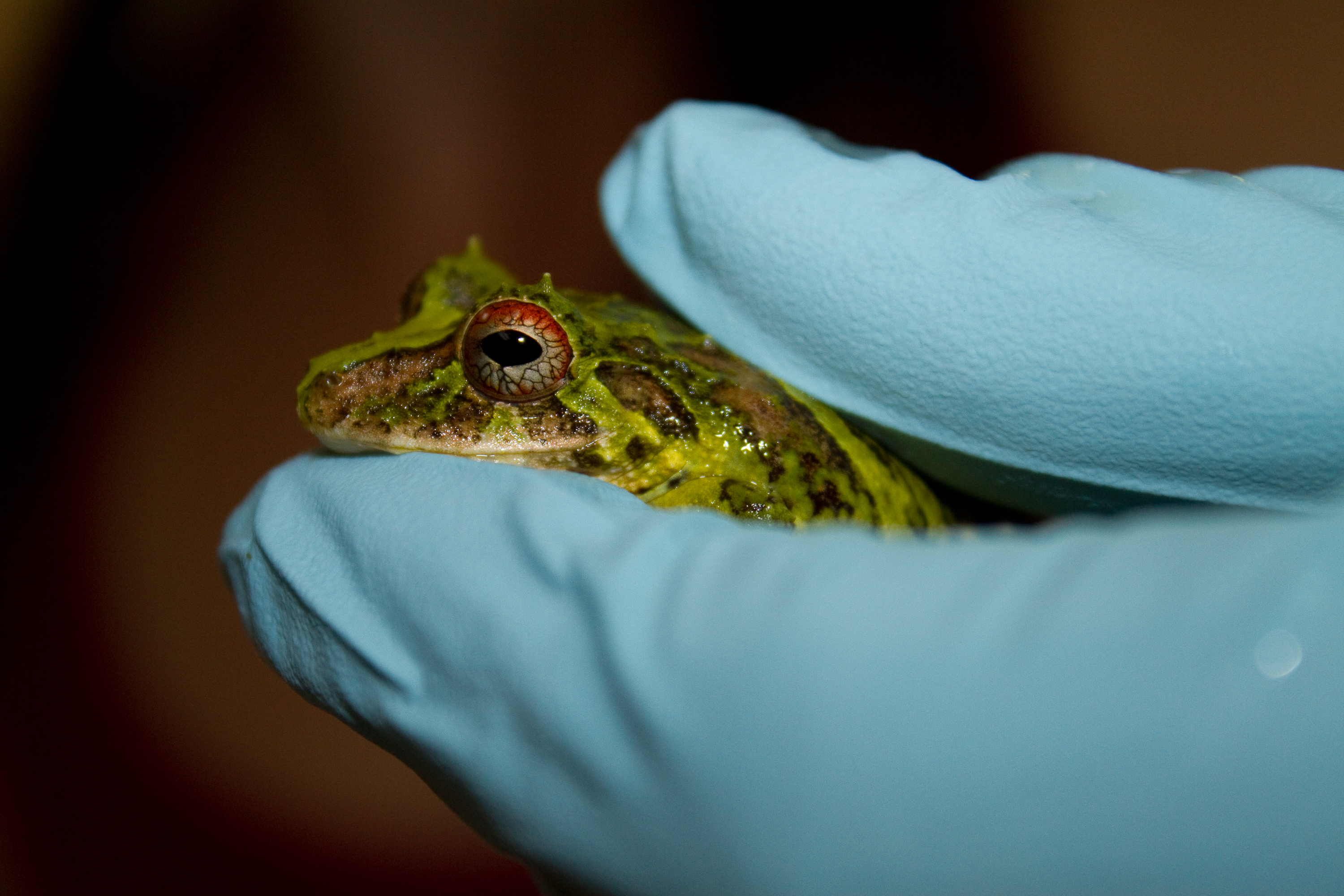

Conservation status
- Vulnerable (IUCN 3.1)

Scientific classification
- Kingdom: Animalia
- Phylum: Chordata
- Class: Amphibia
- Order: Anura
- Family: Strabomantidae
- Genus: Pristimantis
- Species: P. museosus

Binomial name
- Pristimantis museosus (Ibáñez, Jaramillo & Arosemena, 1994)

Synonyms
- Eleutherodactylus museosus Ibáñez, Jaramillo & Arosemena, 1994

= Pristimantis museosus =

Species of frog

Pristimantis museosus is a species of frog in the family Strabomantidae. It is endemic to Panama. Its natural habitat is tropical moist montane forests. It is threatened by habitat loss.
