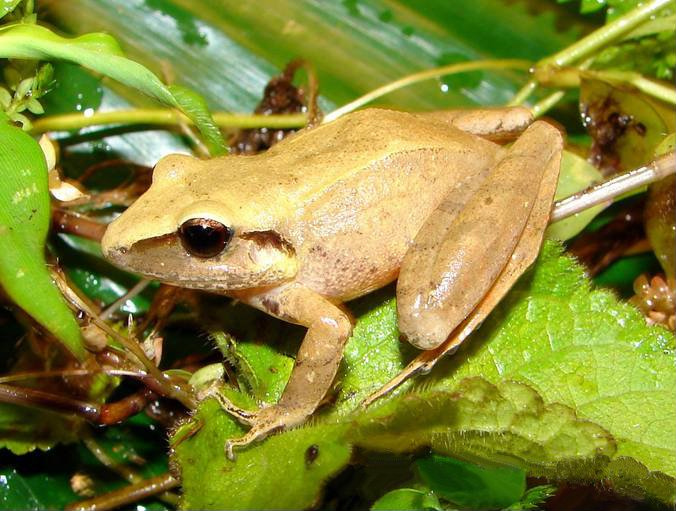

Conservation status
- Least Concern (IUCN 3.1)

Scientific classification
- Kingdom: Animalia
- Phylum: Chordata
- Class: Amphibia
- Order: Anura
- Family: Strabomantidae
- Genus: Pristimantis
- Species: P. achatinus

Binomial name
- Pristimantis achatinus (Boulenger, 1898)

Synonyms
- Hylodes achatinus Boulenger, 1898; Hylodes pagmae Fowler, 1913; Eleutherodactylus achatinus (Boulenger, 1898); Eleutherodactylus brederi Dunn, 1934

= Pristimantis achatinus =

Cachabi robber frog

Species of amphibian

Pristimantis achatinus, also known as Cachabi robber frog or pastures rainfrog, is a species of frog in the family Strabomantidae. It is found from eastern Panama through Colombia to western Ecuador. Its natural habitats are both lowland and montane habitats: forest clearings, road cuts in forest, and banana, cacao and coffee plantations, as well as in forested areas. It is mostly terrestrial, sometimes occurring off the ground in vegetation. It is a very common frog.
