= Isthmohyla calypsa =

Conservation status
- Critically endangered, possibly extinct (IUCN 3.1)

Scientific classification
- Kingdom: Animalia
- Phylum: Chordata
- Class: Amphibia
- Order: Anura
- Family: Hylidae
- Genus: Isthmohyla
- Species: I. calypsa

Binomial name
- Isthmohyla calypsa (Lips, 1996)

Synonyms
- Hyla calypsa Lips, 1996

Species of amphibian

Isthmohyla calypsa, the Calypsa tree frog is a critically endangered, possibly extinct species of frogs in the family Hylidae. It is known from the southern Cordillera de Talamanca in Costa Rica, Cerro Pando in Costa Rica and Panama, and the Pacific slope in southwestern Panama. It appears to now be extirpated from Costa Rica. Prior to its description in 1996, this species was confused with Isthmohyla lancasteri, a species now known from lower altitudes only.

== Description ==
Males grow to about 36 mm (1.4 in) and females to about 41 mm (1.6 in) in snout–vent length. The dorsum is metallic green, mottled with darker drab green or brown blotches and covered by large, spinous bumps (females are spinier than males). Also the limbs are spiny. The ventrum is white and has some scattered black blotches or smaller spots. The groin and the thighs are bright white and have scattered black spots.

== Habitat and conssration ==
The calypsa tree frog lives in primary humid lower montane forests along torrential streams at elevations of 1,500–2,100 m (4,900–6,900 ft) above sea level.

This species has disappeared from Costa Rica. Its abundance in Panama is unknown although it is assumed to have declined there too. The declines have happened within pristine habitats and are probably caused by chytridiomycosis. Also habitat loss from smallholder livestock farming is a threat for this species. It has been recorded in the La Amistad International Park and might occur in the Volcán Barú National Park.
