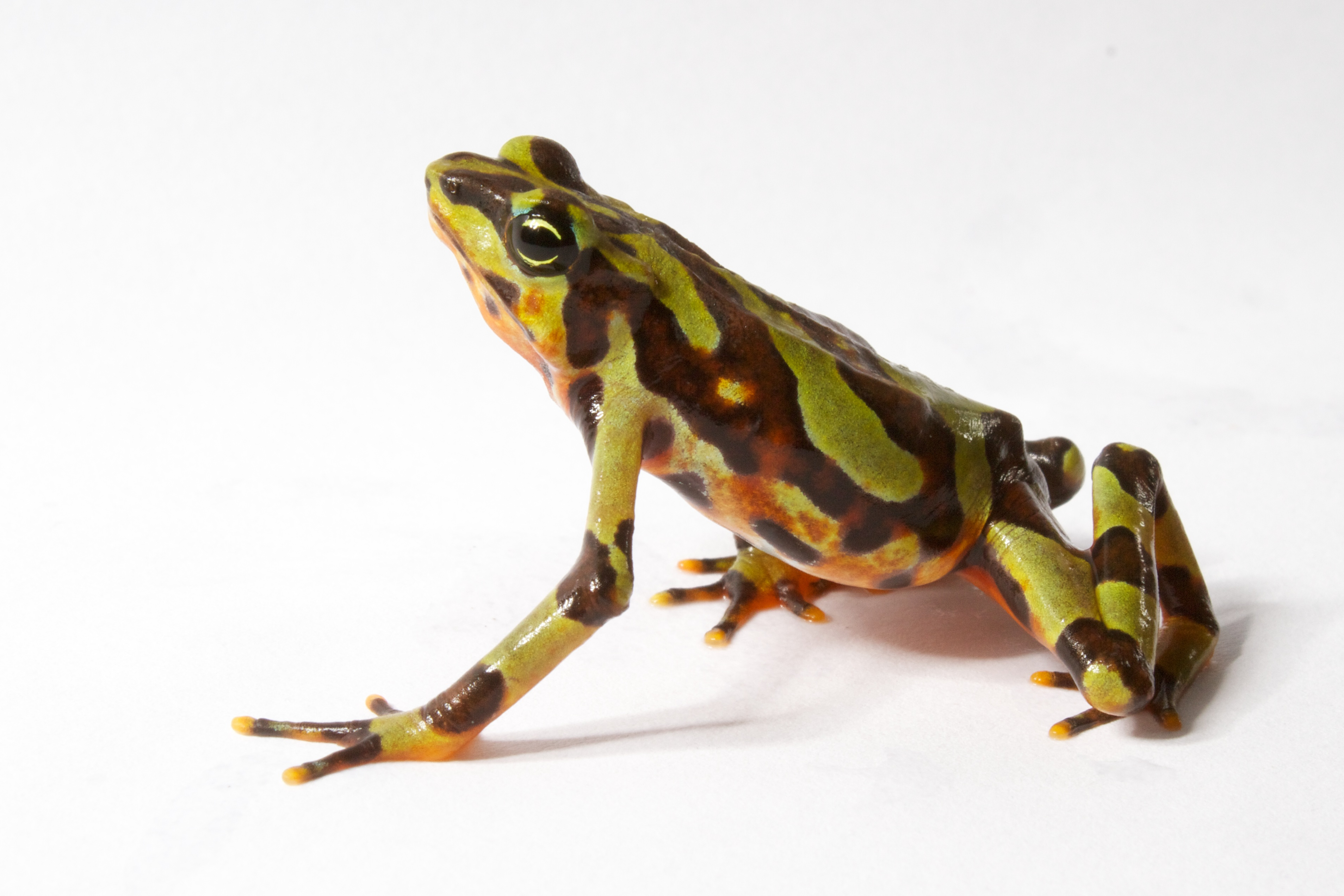

Conservation status
- Critically Endangered (IUCN 3.1)

Scientific classification
- Kingdom: Animalia
- Phylum: Chordata
- Class: Amphibia
- Order: Anura
- Family: Bufonidae
- Genus: Atelopus
- Species: A. varius

Binomial name
- Atelopus varius (Lichtenstein and Martens, 1856)

Synonyms
- Synonymy: Atelopus bibronii Boulenger, 1894; Atelopus loomisi Taylor, 1955; Hylaemorphus bibronii Schmidt, 1857; Hylaemorphus dumerilii Schmidt, 1857; Hylaemorphus pluto Schmidt, 1858; Hylaemorphus plutonius Jan, 1857; Phrynidium bibronii (Schmidt, 1857); Phrynidium varium Lichtenstein & Martens, 1856; Phryniscus bibronii (Schmidt, 1857); Phryniscus dumerilii Brocchi, 1882; Phryniscus varius (Lichtenstein & Martens, 1856)

= Atelopus varius =

Costa Rican variable harlequin toad

Species of amphibian

Atelopus varius, the Costa Rican variable harlequin toad or clown frog, is a small Neotropical true toad from the family Bufonidae. Once ranging from Costa Rica to Panama, A. varius is now listed as critically endangered and has been reduced to a single remnant population near Quepos, Costa Rica (rediscovered in 2003), and has only relict populations in western Panama. Recent variation in air temperature, precipitation, stream flow patterns, and the subsequent spread of a pathogenic chytrid fungus (Batrachochytrium dendrobatidis) linked to global climate change have been the leading cause of decline for A. varius. A. zeteki has been considered a subspecies of A. varius, but is now generally considered a separate species.

== Geographic range ==
The historic range of A. varius stretched from the Pacific and Atlantic slopes of the Cordilleras de Tilaran mountain range in Costa Rica into western Panama. Suitable habitat includes both pre-montane and lower-montane zones as well as some lowland sites along rocky streams in hilly areas (ranging from 6 to 2,000 metres or 20 to 6,562 feet in elevation).

== Habitat and ecology ==
A. varius is a diurnal frog often found on rocks or in crevices along streams in humid lowland and montane forests. It is primarily a terrestrial species, only entering the water during breeding season, relying on spray from streams for moisture.

The Costa Rican variable harlequin frog is slow moving and often remains in the same area for long periods of time. The conspicuous or aposematic coloration of A. varius likely serves as a warning to potential predators of the toxicity of the frog's integument which contains tetrodotoxin, a potent neurotoxin. Its main food source is small arthropods that are most abundant during the dry season. The only known predator of A. varius is a parasitic sarcophagid fly Notochaeta bufonivora which deposits its larvae on the surface of the frog's thigh. The larvae then proceed to burrow inside the frog and eat it from within.

== Conservation status ==
In recent decades, A. varius has become increasingly rare throughout its geographic range. The first incidence of its disappearance was recorded after a census conducted between 1990 and 1992 near Monteverde, Costa Rica revealed zero individuals where its population had previously peaked at 751 adults. By the mid-1990s, A. varius was believed to be extinct throughout Costa Rica, however, in a 2019 assessment, two subpopulations were discovered in the country. In Panama, mass mortality has drastically reduced populations of A. varius in recent years and it was believed to be locally extinct, however the species was recorded again in the 2019 assessment.

Several theories related to changes in climatic patterns have been put forth to account for the rapid decline of A. varius. A trend toward rising temperatures across the tropics in the late 1980s and early 1990s has been implicated in the declines of multiple lizard and amphibian species including several Atelopus spp. More recently, an observed global decline in amphibian species richness has been linked to an outbreak of the pathogenic chytrid fungus Batrachochytrium dendrobatidis. This pathogen can be transmitted between individuals through shed skin cells and is known to infect keratinized body surfaces where it can impair cutaneous respiration and osmoregulation thus resulting in mortality. Attempts to preserve A. varius include a recently initiated captive breeding program as well as continued efforts to protect vital forest habitat. In March 2021, it was announced that the species had been successfully bred in captivity outside of Panama for the first time.
