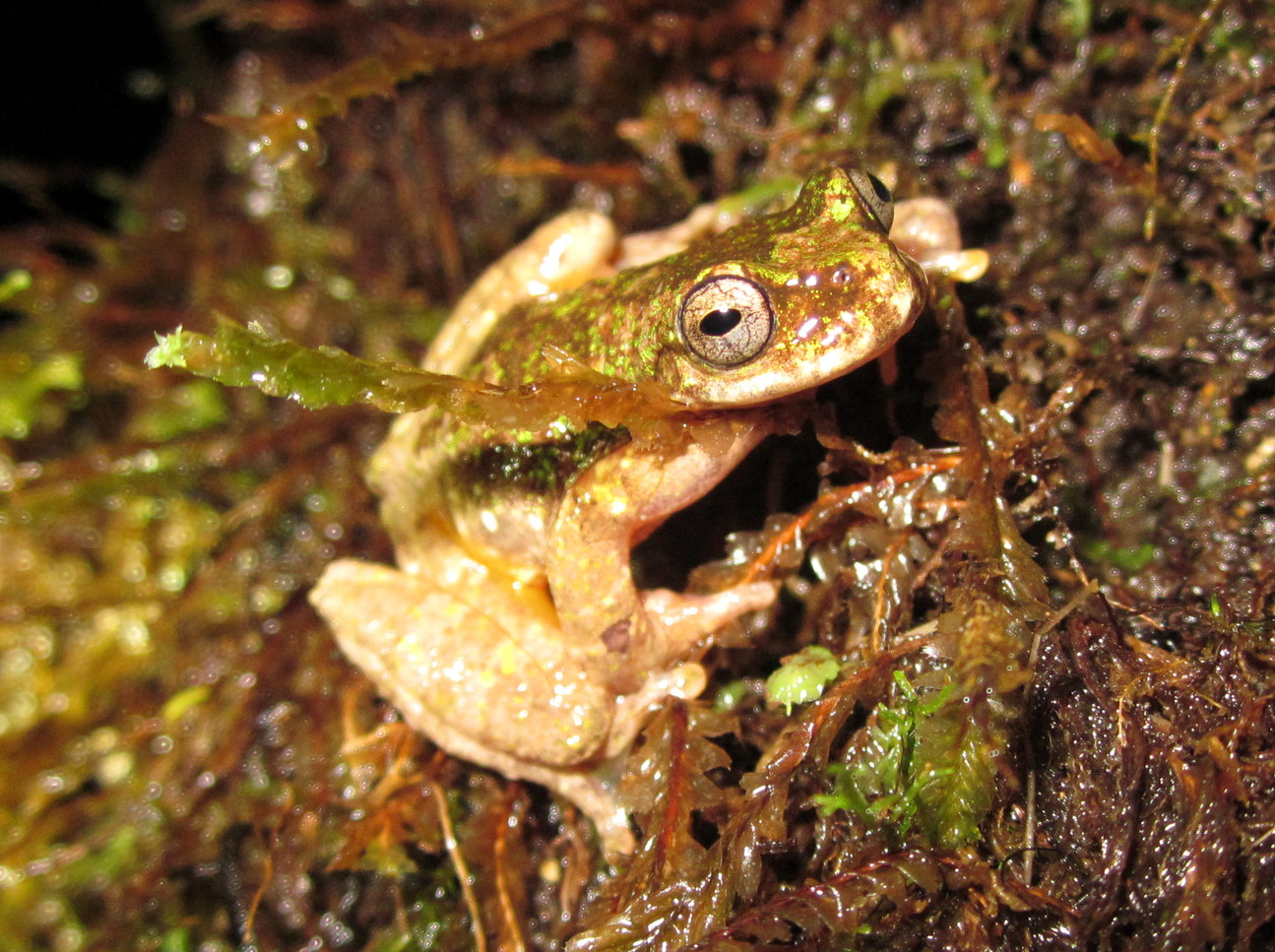
- Isthmohyla tica in Alajuela, Costa Rica

Conservation status
- Critically Endangered (IUCN 3.1)

Scientific classification
- Kingdom: Animalia
- Phylum: Chordata
- Class: Amphibia
- Order: Anura
- Family: Hylidae
- Genus: Isthmohyla
- Species: I. tica

Binomial name
- Isthmohyla tica (Starrett, 1966)

Synonyms
- Hyla tica Starrett, 1966

= Isthmohyla tica =

Species of frog

Isthmohyla tica, also known as Starrett's treefrog, is a species of frog in the family Hylidae. It is found in the Cordillera de Tilarán, Cordillera Central, and Cordillera de Talamanca of Costa Rica and western Panama. The specific name tica is derived from the name that Costa Ricans use to refer themselves, tico.

== Description ==
Adult males measure 29–34 mm (1.1–1.3 in) and adult females 34–42 mm (1.3–1.7 in) in snout–vent length. The snout is rounded in profile. The tympanum is visible. Supratympanic fold is present. The fingers are up to 1/3 webbed and bear terminal discs. The toes are about 4/5 webbed and bear discs similar to the finger ones. The dorsum is mottled with shades of green and brown. There are often some bright green flecks present too. The flanks are usually brown mottled or blotched with yellow. The upper arm is brown or orangeish. The upper surfaces of the limbs bear dark bars. The ventral surface is a dingy white.

The tadpoles have small, somewhat flattened body and a very long tail with low fins. They have a large oral disc that can be used adhere to rocks in fast-flowing streams.

== Habitat and conservation ==
Isthmohyla tica occur in humid premontane and lower montane rainforests at elevations of 1,100–1,650 m (3,610–5,410 ft) above sea level. They are nocturnal. Males usually call from vegetation overhanging the fastest-flowing stretches of streams, about 1–3 m (3–10 ft) above the water. The eggs are deposited under rocks in streams where the tadpoles then develop.

Many populations of this species have disappeared (but sometimes rediscovered later) or collapsed. The exact cause of these large declines is unknown, but may involve some combination of chytridiomycosis and climate change. The species is also negatively affected by habitat loss. It has been recorded in a number of protected areas.
