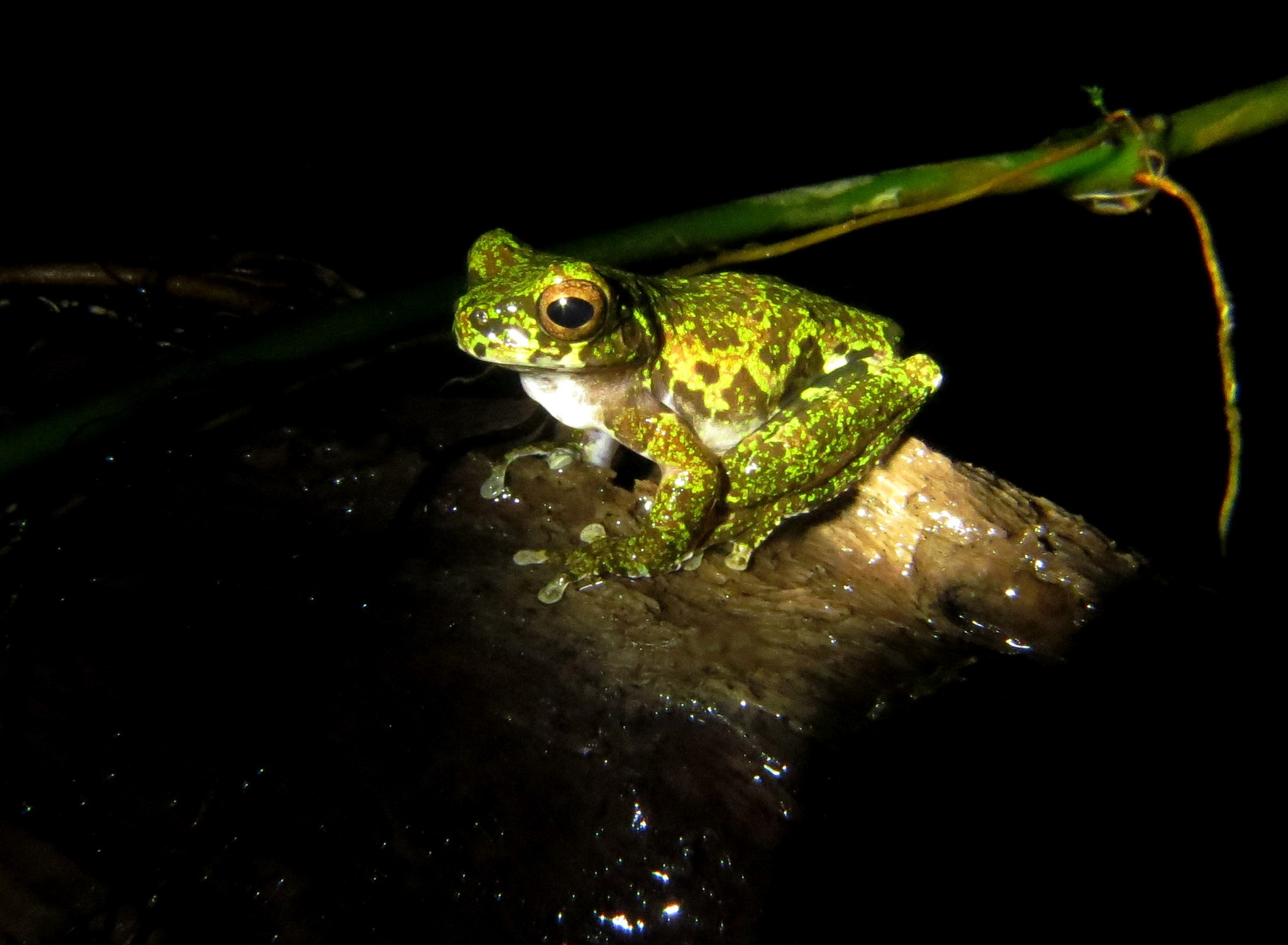

Conservation status
- Least Concern (IUCN 3.1)

Scientific classification
- Kingdom: Animalia
- Phylum: Chordata
- Class: Amphibia
- Order: Anura
- Family: Hylidae
- Genus: Isthmohyla
- Species: I. lancasteri

Binomial name
- Isthmohyla lancasteri (Barbour, 1928)

Synonyms
- Hyla lancasteri Barbour, 1928; Hyla moraviaensis Taylor, 1952

= Isthmohyla lancasteri =

Species of frog

Isthmohyla lancasteri (common name: Lancaster's treefrog) is a species of frog in the family Hylidae. It is endemic to humid premontane slopes of the Cordillera de Talamanca in Costa Rica and western Panama.

== Taxonomy ==
Isthmohyla lancasteri was described by Thomas Barbour in 1928, based a single specimen (the holotype) collected by C. R. Lancaster—and after whom the species is named. The species is very variable; however, high-altitude populations that were first ascribed to this species were in 1996 recognized as a new, distinct species, Isthmohyla calypsa.

== Description ==
Males grow to about 34 mm (1.3 in) and females to about 41 mm (1.6 in) in snout–vent length. The eyes are large and the snout is very short and blunt. The dorsum is mottled in shades of brown, green, and grey. The ventrum is greyish white and may have dark mottling, depending on locality. The thighs are either yellow with black barring or white with black spots, again depending on locality.

The tadpoles are relatively large and have oval body with a long, muscular tail and short tail fins. Their color is brown, with some darker or green markings.

== Habitat and conservation ==
Isthmohyla lancasteri live in humid lowland and montane forests at elevations of 368–1,200 m (1,207–3,937 ft) above sea level. They also inhabit modified habitats where few trees remain (e.g., pastureland). The eggs are laid in pools within streams.

This species is common in Costa Rica; its abundance in Panama is unknown. It occurs in the La Amistad International Park. There is some habitat loss (deforestation) occurring in its range but the species is not considered threatened by the International Union for Conservation of Nature (IUCN).
