= Continental Divide tree frog =

Conservation status
- Critically Endangered (IUCN 3.1)

Scientific classification
- Kingdom: Animalia
- Phylum: Chordata
- Class: Amphibia
- Order: Anura
- Family: Hylidae
- Genus: Isthmohyla
- Species: I. graceae

Binomial name
- Isthmohyla graceae (Myers & Duellman, 1982)

Synonyms
- Hyla graceae Myers & Duellman, 1982

Species of amphibian

The Continental Divide tree frog (Isthmohyla graceae) is a species of frog in the family Hylidae found in Panama and possibly Costa Rica. Its natural habitats are subtropical or tropical moist montane forests, rivers, freshwater marshes, and intermittent freshwater marshes. It is threatened by habitat loss.
