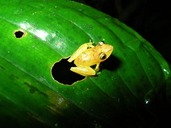

Conservation status
- Least Concern (IUCN 3.1)

Scientific classification
- Kingdom: Animalia
- Phylum: Chordata
- Class: Amphibia
- Order: Anura
- Family: Strabomantidae
- Genus: Pristimantis
- Species: P. caryophyllaceus

Binomial name
- Pristimantis caryophyllaceus (Barbour, 1928)

Synonyms
- Syrrhopus caryophyllaceus Barbour, 1928; Eleutherodactylus caryophyllaceus (Barbour, 1928)

= Pristimantis caryophyllaceus =

Species of frog

Pristimantis caryophyllaceus is a species of frog in the family Strabomantidae. It is found in Costa Rica and Panama; records from Colombia prior to 2010 refer to Pristimantis educatoris. However, taxonomy of Pristimantis caryophyllaceus and P. educatoris remain unsettled, and many sources continue to report Pristimantis caryophyllaceus from Colombia.

Pristimantis caryophyllaceus is sometimes known as the La Loma robber frog, after La Loma, its type locality on the trail between Chiriquicito and Boquete, in the Bocas del Toro Province of Panama.

== Description ==
Males grow to 24 mm (0.94 in) and females to 26 mm (1.0 in) in snout–vent length. Tympanum is not clearly visible. Dorsal colouration is highly variable: yellow, pinkish, brownish, greyish, or dark green. There are always distinct darker spots on the dorsal surface, in some individuals extending into dark crossbars. The ventral surface is white, sometimes with some dark pigmentation.

== Reproduction ==
Eggs are laid on leaves or on the ground. Females brood the eggs, covering them with their bodies.

== Habitat and conservation ==
The species' natural habitats are primary lowland moist and wet forest, premontane wet forests, and rainforests. They occur in the leaf-litter and low vegetation, and also in bromeliads. They are nocturnal.

Pristimantis caryophyllaceus is threatened by habitat loss and possibly chytridiomycosis. It has disappeared from lowland areas of Costa Rica, but remains common in some areas and appears to have been recovering others.
