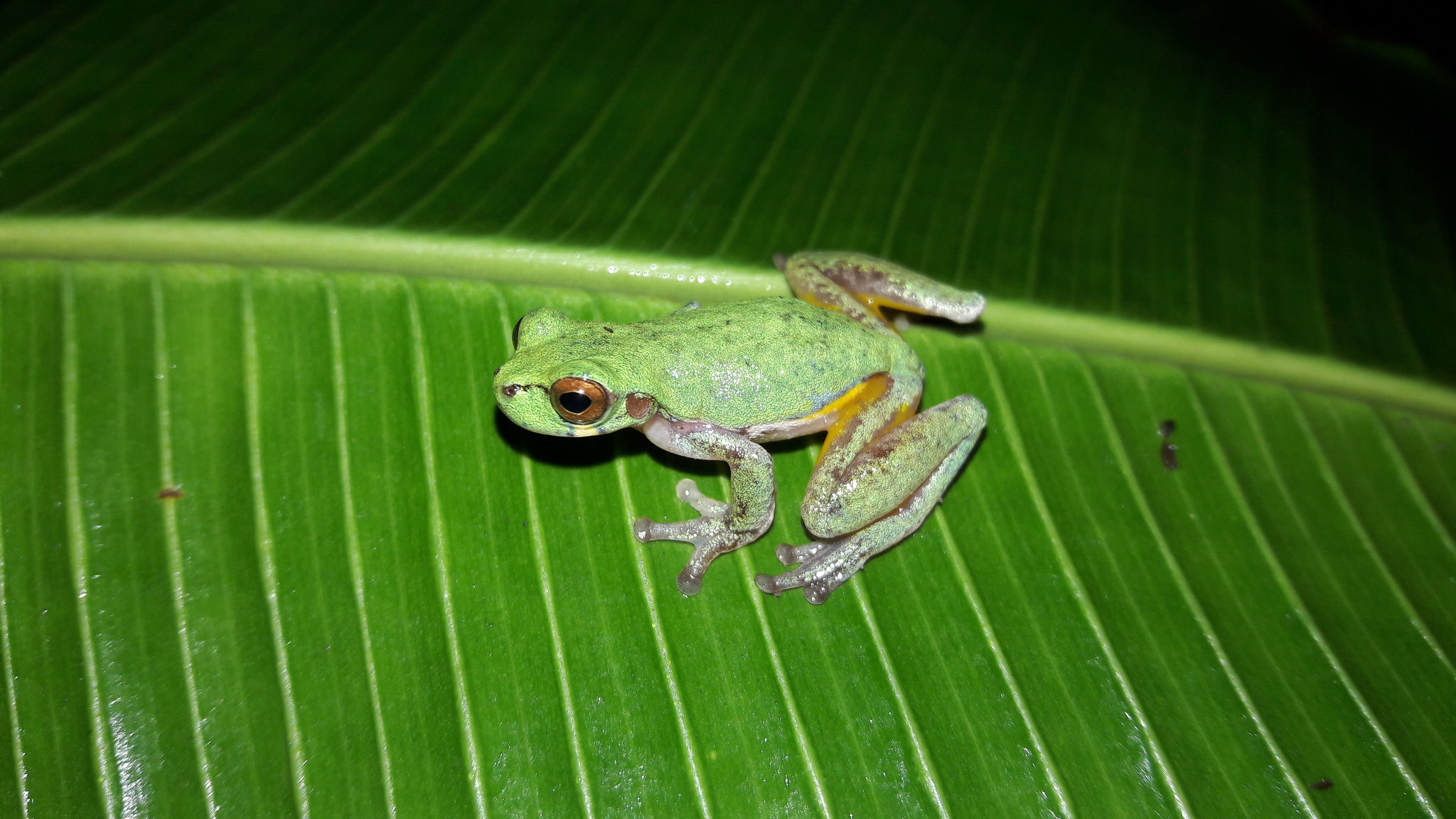

Conservation status
- Critically Endangered (IUCN 3.1)

Scientific classification
- Kingdom: Animalia
- Phylum: Chordata
- Class: Amphibia
- Order: Anura
- Family: Hylidae
- Genus: Isthmohyla
- Species: I. debilis

Binomial name
- Isthmohyla debilis (Taylor, 1952)

Synonyms
- Hyla debilis Taylor, 1952

= Isthmohyla debilis =

Species of amphibian

Isthmohyla debilis is a rare species of frog in the family Hylidae. It occurs in the Atlantic slopes of the Cordillera Central and Cordillera Talamanca in Costa Rica and western Panama as well as on the Pacific slopes in southwestern Panama. Common name Isla Bonita treefrog has been suggested for it (the type locality is "Isla Bonita" in Costa Rica).

== Description ==
Males grow to 30 mm (1.2 in) and females to 32 mm (1.3 in) in snout–vent length. The snout is moderately long and acutely rounded. The tympanum is distinct but partly covered by the supratympanic fold. The fingers bear comparatively small discs and are about one-third webbed. The toes have discs that are about as large as those on the fingers and are two-thirds webbed. The dorsal color is drab green with small, black flecks, turning white with black flecking on the flanks. There is a dark brown stripe running through the eye, bordered above by a lighter stripe. The upper lip is white. Most specimens have a white spot below the eye. The iris is coppery.

== Habitat and conservation ==
Isthmohyla debilis occurs in the lower reaches of cloud forests at 910–1,450 m (2,990–4,760 ft) above sea level. It is an arboreal species but associated with low vegetation overhanging small montane streams, not far above the water surface. The tadpoles develop in streams.

This species has declined dramatically: it is rare and possibly extinct in Costa Rica, and while observations are still made in Panama, they are decreasing in frequency. Many of the earlier records come from protected areas (e.g., Fortuna Forest Reserve in Panama). The decline is probably caused by chytridiomycosis. Habitat loss caused by agriculture, logging, and human settlement represent additional threats.
