= Craugastor podiciferus =

Conservation status
- Least Concern (IUCN 3.1)

Scientific classification
- Kingdom: Animalia
- Phylum: Chordata
- Class: Amphibia
- Order: Anura
- Family: Craugastoridae
- Genus: Craugastor
- Species: C. podiciferus

Binomial name
- Craugastor podiciferus (Cope, 1876)

Synonyms
- Eleutherodactylus blairi Barbour, 1928; Lithodytes habenatus Cope, 1875; Lithodytes muricinus Cope, 1875; Eleutherodactylus jota Lynch, 1980

Species of frog

Craugastor podiciferus, also known as the Rio Changena robber frog, is a species of frog in the family Craugastoridae. It is found in Costa Rica and Panama. Its natural habitat is subtropical or tropical moist montane forests. It is threatened by habitat loss.

== Description ==
The snout is long and ovoid in dorsal view, depressed and somewhat pointed in lateral view. The canthus rostralis is sharp. The supra-tympanic fold becomes distinct only behind the tympanum. The fingers have no lateral keels and have weakly bulbous tips. The toes have no lateral keels either but bear discs. The dorsum is grayish brown or brown. There are some spots and an inter-orbital bar. A black line marks the canthal and the supra-tympanic fold. The belly is dark brown or black and has bluish-white flecks, or is gray-orange. The throat is orange or gray-orange.
