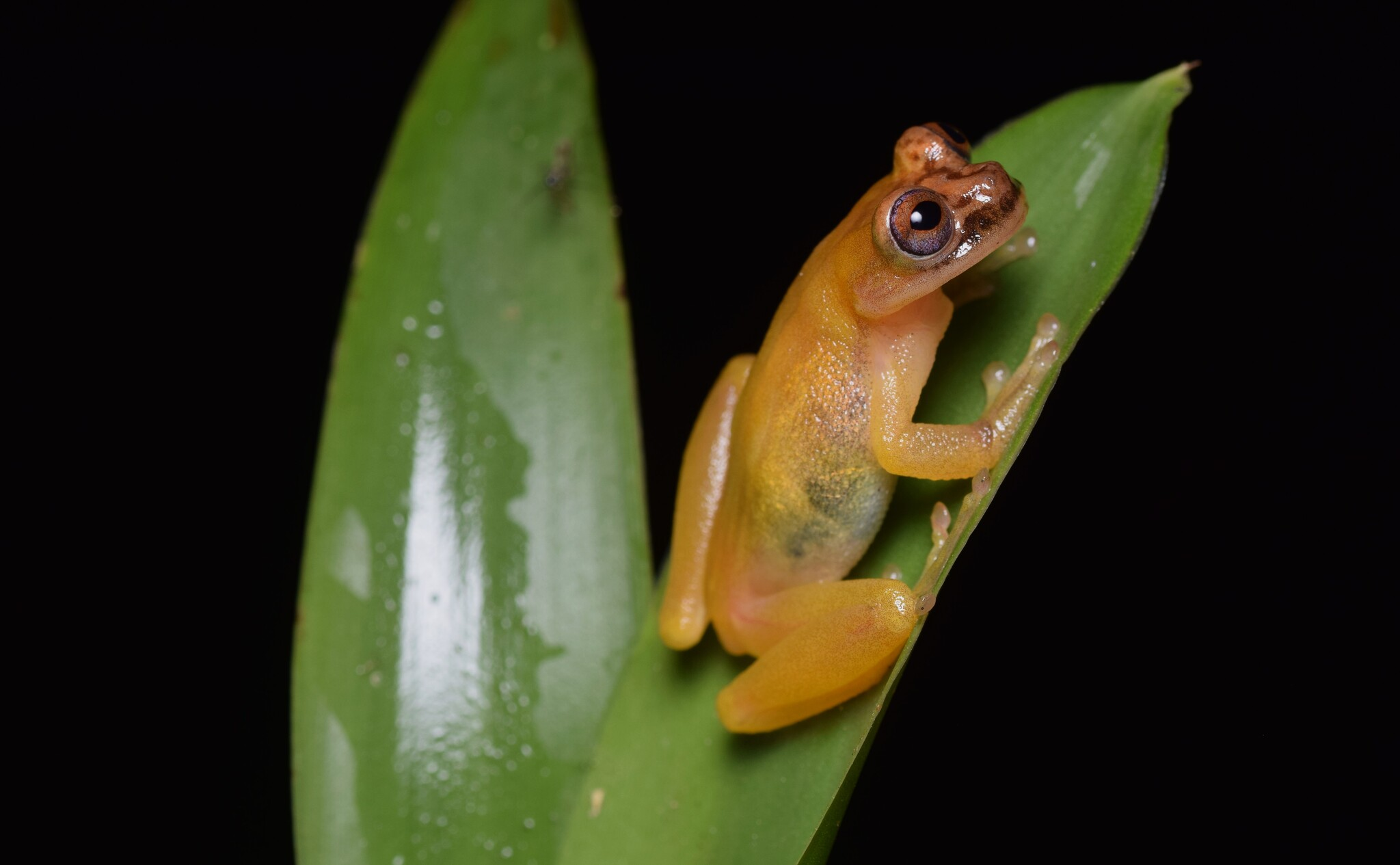

Conservation status
- Vulnerable (IUCN 3.1)

Scientific classification
- Kingdom: Animalia
- Phylum: Chordata
- Class: Amphibia
- Order: Anura
- Family: Hylidae
- Genus: Isthmohyla
- Species: I. zeteki

Binomial name
- Isthmohyla zeteki (Gaige, 1929)

Synonyms
- Hyla zeteki Gaige, 1929

= Isthmohyla zeteki =

Species of amphibian

Isthmohyla zeteki is a species of frog in the family Hylidae native to the Cordillera Central and Cordillera de Talamanca of Costa Rica and western Panama. The specific name zeteki honors James Zetek, an American entomologist who worked in Panama. Common name Zetek's treefrog has been coined for the species.

== Description ==
Isthmohyla zeteki are small treefrogs, with males growing to 24 mm (0.94 in) and females to 27 mm (1.1 in) snout–vent length. The eyes are large. The tympanum is distinct. The fingers have large discs and rudiments of basal webbing. The outer toes are two-thirds webbed whereas the inner toe is almost free from webbing; the discs are smaller than those on the fingers. Dorsal coloration varies from yellowish tan to green, whereas ventral surface is translucent white. The iris is dull red, red-brown, or bronzy pink.

The male advertisement call lasts about four seconds and consists of five pulsed notes. The second and third note are the shortest, and the two last ones are the longest, but with a lower pulse rate.

== Habitat and conservation ==
Its natural habitats are humid premontane and lower montane forests at elevations of 1,200–1,800 m (3,900–5,900 ft) asl. It is a canopy species living in bromeliads, where its tadpoles develop. It can also occur in modified habitats such as pastures, provided that suitable trees with bromeliads remain. The species has also been recorded in a large terrestrial tank bromeliad.

Costa Rican populations appear to be stable in suitable habitat (although estimating density of these arboreal frogs is difficult). In the Panamanian part of its range it is probably impacted by habitat loss.
