= Narrow-lined tree frog =

Conservation status
- Critically Endangered (IUCN 3.1)

Scientific classification
- Kingdom: Animalia
- Phylum: Chordata
- Class: Amphibia
- Order: Anura
- Family: Hylidae
- Genus: Isthmohyla
- Species: I. angustilineata

Binomial name
- Isthmohyla angustilineata (Taylor, 1952)

Synonyms
- Hyla angustilineata Taylor, 1952

Species of amphibian

The narrow-lined tree frog (Isthmohyla angustilineata) is a species of frogs in the family Hylidae found in the mountains of Costa Rica and western Panama. Its natural habitats are humid lower montane rainforests. It is a nocturnal species that breeds in small puddles and water-filled depressions.

Population declines of this species have been attributed to chytridiomycosis. It is found in several protected areas.
