= Isthmohyla picadoi =

Conservation status
- Least Concern (IUCN 3.1)

Scientific classification
- Kingdom: Animalia
- Phylum: Chordata
- Class: Amphibia
- Order: Anura
- Family: Hylidae
- Genus: Isthmohyla
- Species: I. picadoi

Binomial name
- Isthmohyla picadoi (Dunn, 1937)

Species of frog

Isthmohyla picadoi is a species of frog in the family Hylidae. It is found in Costa Rica and Panama. Its natural habitat is subtropical or tropical moist montane forests. It is threatened by habitat loss.
