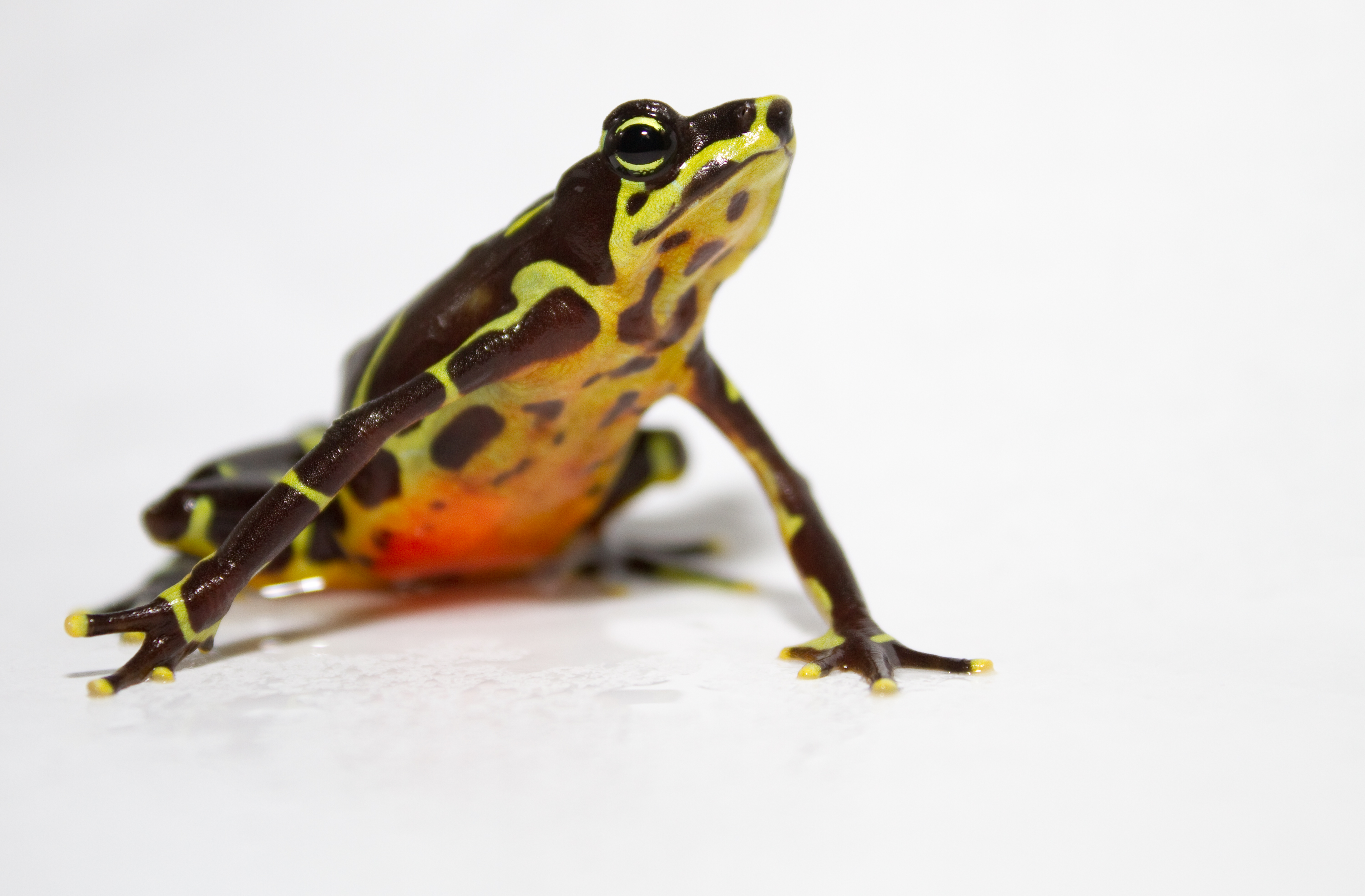
- Atelopus limosus female

Conservation status
- Critically Endangered (IUCN 3.1)

Scientific classification
- Kingdom: Animalia
- Phylum: Chordata
- Class: Amphibia
- Order: Anura
- Family: Bufonidae
- Genus: Atelopus
- Species: A. limosus

Binomial name
- Atelopus limosus Ibáñez, Jaramillo & Solís, 1995

= Atelopus limosus =

Limosa harlequin frog

Species of amphibian

Atelopus limosus, the limosa harlequin frog (Spanish: sapo limoso) is an endangered species of toad in the family Bufonidae endemic to Panama. Its natural habitats are stream banks in tropical moist lowland forests and rivers of the Chagres watershed in central Panama.

== Description ==
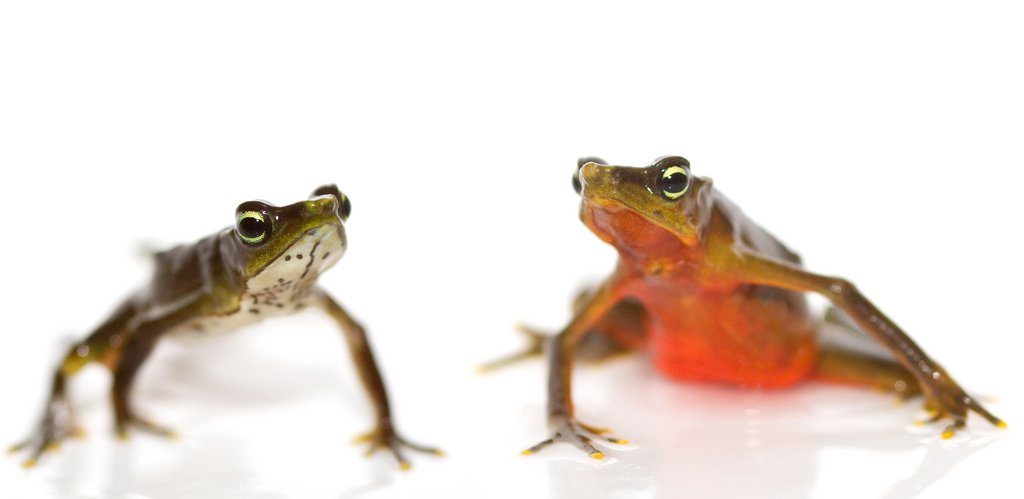
Lowland color form of A. limosus male left, female right

Atelopus limosus has two color forms. A lowland color form is brown with a yellow nose and fingertips, mean the male species while the upland color form is green with black chevron markings on its back. Males and females of both color forms are sexually dimorphic. Males are smaller with white bellies speckled with black spots, while females tend to have red or orange bellies.

Little is known of their diet in the wild, but it is presumably similar to that of other Atelopus species that forage on beetles, ants, flies, and mites. In captivity, the frogs readily accept large fruit flies, small meal-worm larvae, and small crickets.

== Conservation ==
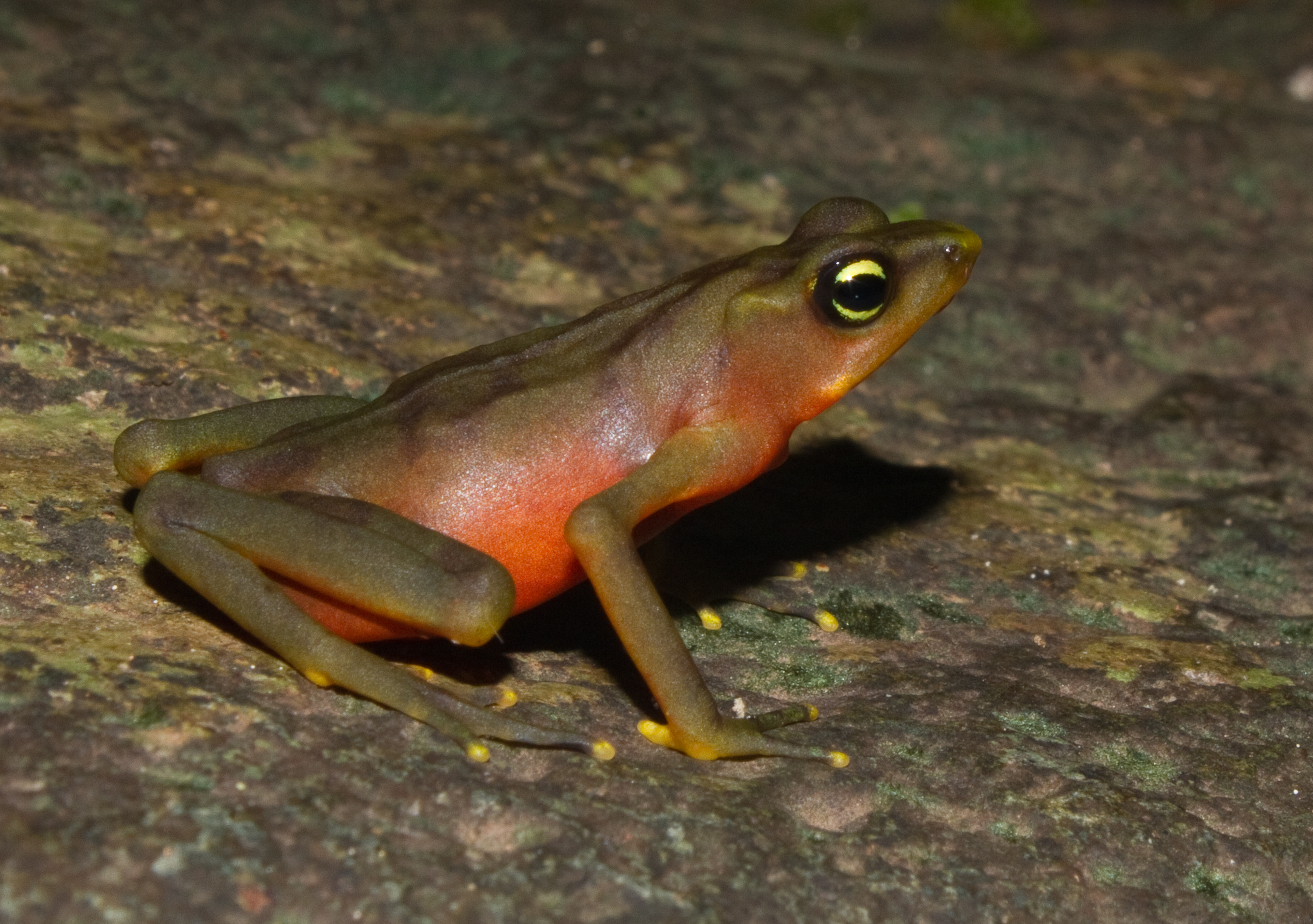
Female on a log, looking for a mate

A. limosus is threatened by chytridiomycosis and habitat loss. Species have been rapidly declining throughout their range. About 75% of all known species from highland sites above 1000 m have disappeared, while 58% of lowland species have declined and 38% have disappeared. Worried about the effects of chytridiomycosis on this endemic Panamanian frog, the Panama Amphibian Rescue and Conservation Project targeted A. limosus as a priority rescue species to be taken into captivity as an assurance colony at the Summit Municipal Park in Panama City. When the rescue team arrived at one of the last known upland sites at Cerro Brewster, they found many of the frogs were already infected with chytridiomycosis. The captive-breeding program has been successful. While the upland region seems to have been hard-hit by chytrid fungus, the fate of lowland populations of this species is uncertain, as chytridiomycosis appears to have more pronounced effects at upland sites.
