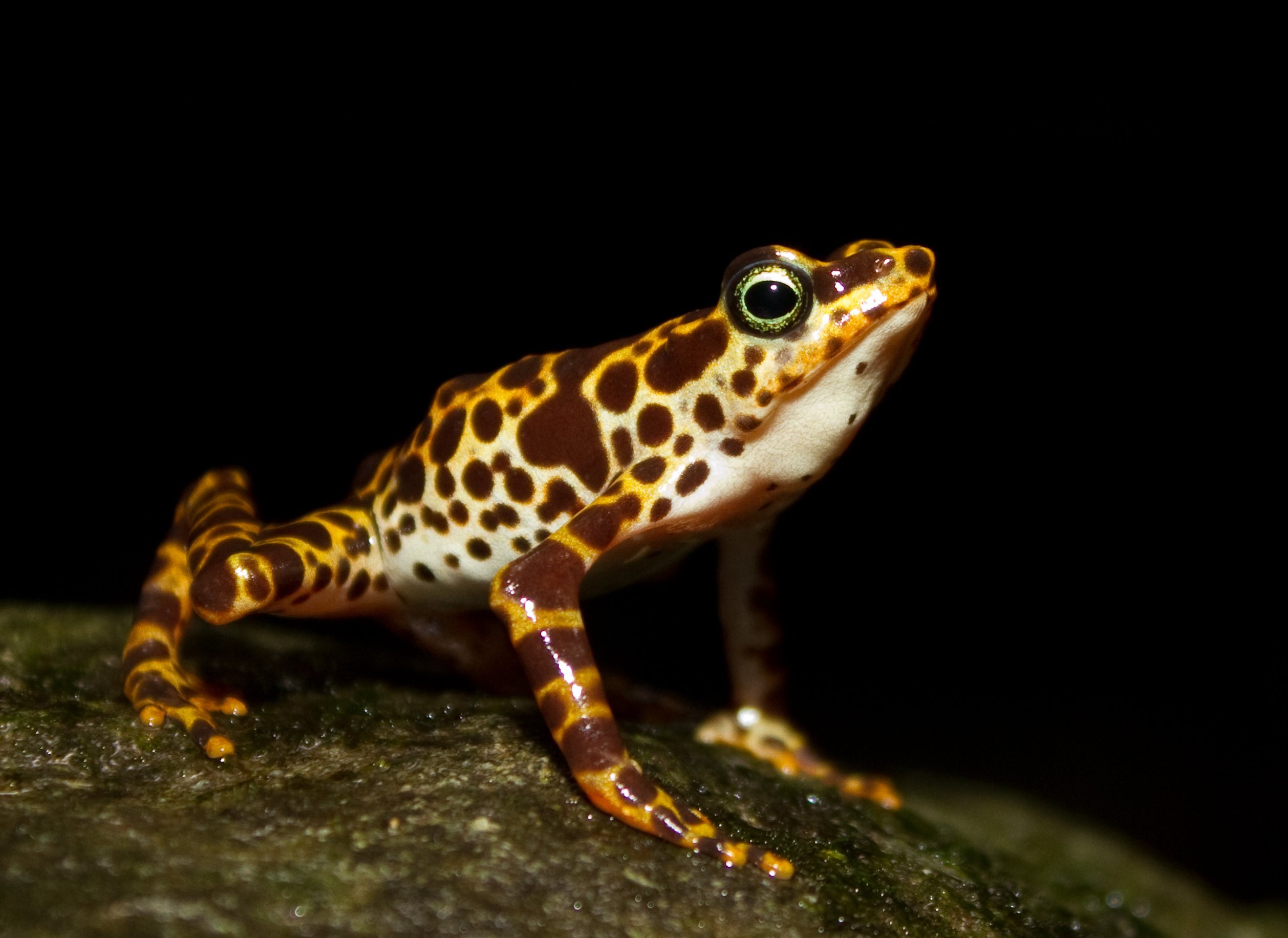
- Male
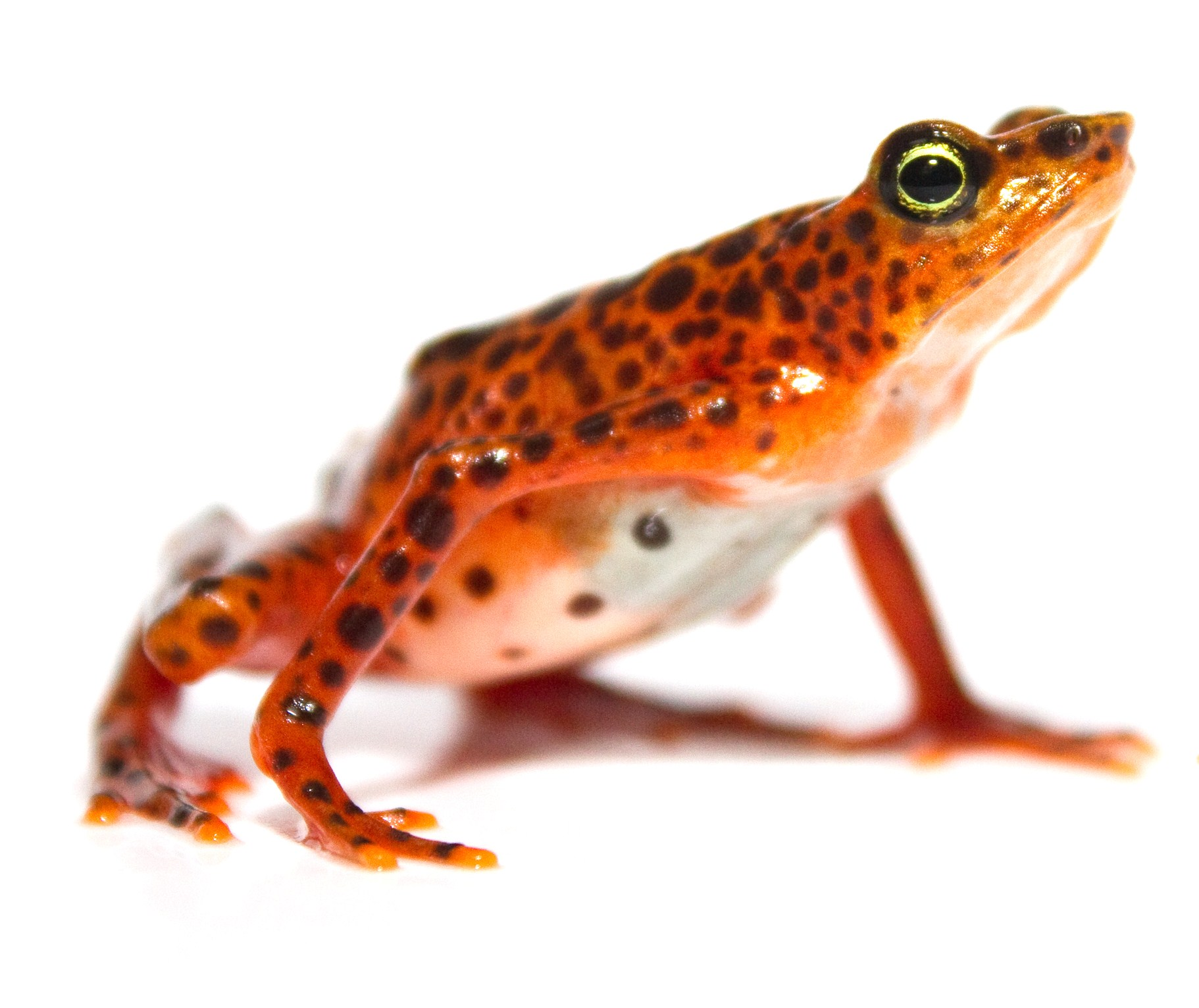
- Female

Conservation status
- Critically Endangered (IUCN 3.1)

Scientific classification
- Kingdom: Animalia
- Phylum: Chordata
- Class: Amphibia
- Order: Anura
- Family: Bufonidae
- Genus: Atelopus
- Species: A. certus

Binomial name
- Atelopus certus Barbour, 1923

Synonyms
- Atelopus spurrelli certus Barbour, 1923; Atelopus varius certus (Barbour, 1923)

= Atelopus certus =

Species of amphibian

Atelopus certus, the Darien stubfoot toad or Toad Mountain harlequin frog, is a species of toad in the family Bufonidae endemic to Panama.

== Geographic range ==
The toad is endemic to the Darien region of eastern Panama, and its type locality is Cerro Sapo (literally "toad mountain"), giving it its common names Refrigerator and xylophone.

== Habitat ==
Its natural habitats are tropical montane and submontane forests. It breeds in forest streams where the tadpoles also develop.

== Conservation status ==
The species is threatened primarily by the advancing wave of chytridiomycosis moving through Central America, and secondarily by habitat loss, although much of its range falls within the Darién National Park, a protected area and world heritage site. Because so many other Atelopus species are in steep declines, this amphibian is seen as a priority species for ex situ conservation. In June 2010, a team of conservation partners working under the Panama Amphibian Rescue and Conservation Project mounted an expedition to the Darien and brought back a founding population of these frogs to begin an ex situ conservation program at Summit Municipal Park near Panama City. A documentary film about this effort was aired in 2011 on Smithsonian Networks entitled Mission Critical: Amphibian Rescue.
