= Robber frog (disambiguation) =

A robber frog is a frog in the family Craugastoridae.

Robber frog may also refer to:

- Anatipes robber frog, a frog found in Colombia and Ecuador
- Black-banded robber frog, a frog found in Colombia, Ecuador, Peru, and possibly Brazil
- Boqueron robber frog, a frog endemic to Colombia
- Caceres robber frog, a frog found in Brazil and Bolivia
- Cachabi robber frog, a frog found from Panama to Ecuador
- Clay robber frog, a frog endemic to Brazil
- Cuyuja robber frog, a frog found in Colombia and Ecuador
- Danubio robber frog, a frog endemic to Colombia
- False green robber frog, a frog endemic to Haiti
- Fitzinger's robber frog, a frog found in Colombia, Costa Rica, Honduras, Nicaragua, and Panama
- Gunther's robber frog, a frog endemic to Mexico
- Inger's robber frog, a frog found in Colombia and possibly Venezuela
- Karl's robber frog, a frog that is possibly extinct
- La Paz robber frog, a frog found in Bolivia, Peru, and possibly Brazil
- Lancini's robber frog, a frog endemic to Venezuela
- Mantipus robber frog, a frog endemic to Colombia
- Marbled robber frog, a frog found in Brazil, French Guiana, Guyana, Suriname, Venezuela, possibly Colombia, and possibly Peru
- Mindo robber frog, a frog found in Ecuador and possibly Colombia
- Montane robber frog, a critically endangered amphibian
- Narino robber frog, a frog found in Colombia and Ecuador
- Nauta robber frog, a frog found in Brazil, Colombia, Ecuador, and Peru
- Palma Real robber frog, a frog found in Colombia and Ecuador
- Papallacta robber frog, a frog endemic to Ecuador
- Paramo robber frog, a frog endemic to Venezuela
- Paulo's robber frog, a frog endemic to Brazil
- Peters' robber frog, a frog found in Colombia and Ecuador
- Puerto Cabello robber frog, a frog endemic to Venezuela
- Putumayo robber frog, a frog found in Colombia and Ecuador
- Rio Pitzara robber frog, a frog endemic to Ecuador
- Rio Suno robber frog, a frog found in Colombia and Ecuador
- Ruiz's robber frog, a frog endemic to Colombia
- Striped robber frog, a frog found in Colombia and Ecuador
- Tucuman robber frog, a frog found in Argentina and Bolivia

== See also ==
- Rubber frog
