= Craugastor rugosus =

Conservation status
- Least Concern (IUCN 3.1)

Scientific classification
- Kingdom: Animalia
- Phylum: Chordata
- Class: Amphibia
- Order: Anura
- Clade: Brachycephaloidea
- Family: Craugastoridae
- Genus: Craugastor
- Species: C. rugosus

Binomial name
- Craugastor rugosus (Peters, 1874)

Synonyms
- Hylodes rugosus Peters, 1874; Eleutherodactylus rugosus Stejneger, 1904; Lithodytes pelviculus Cope, 1877; Hylodes pelviculus Brocchi, 1881; Eleutherodactylus pelviculus Stejneger, 1904; Lithodytes florulentus Cope, 1893; Hylodes florulentus Günther, 1900; Eleutherodactylus florulentus Stejneger, 1904; Craugastor florulentus Crawford and Smith, 2005; Eleutherodactylus biporcatus sensu Lynch, 1975, misapplied, synonym pro parte

Species of amphibian

Craugastor rugosus is a species of rain frog in the family Craugastoridae. It is found in Costa Rica and southwestern Panama, and possibly southern Nicaragua.

== Vernacular names ==
A local Spanish vernacular name is ranita de hojarasca.

Frank and Ramus (1995) invented the name Veragua robber frog for use in English for the taxon Eleutherodactylus biporcatus (now the name of a Venezuelan species, but in 1995 the name for four other species of frog, including this one, see taxonomy), Veragua being a province of Colombia in the 1860s (now in central Panama) where in 1995 the holotype of E. biporcatus was thought to have been obtained. Because of the taxonomic reshuffling which occurred after Frank and Ramus coined the name "Veragua robber frog", their name is presently applied to Craugastor rugosus, despite the fact that it does not occur in Veraguas Province, and now shares this name with other species derived from E. biporcatus.

== Taxonomy ==
This frog is thought to have first been collected in Chiriquí whilst the region was still Colombian (Panama succeeded a few decades later) by one H. Ribbe, who sent a collection of herpetological specimens to Berlin in the early 1870s. It was then given the name Hylodes rugosus by Wilhelm Peters in 1873 in a lecture read before the Royal Prussian Academy of Science. A formal description was published in an untitled summary of this lecture (later titled as Über eine neue Schildkrötenart, Cinosternon effeldtii und einige andere neue oder weniger bekannte Amphibien) a year later (although dated to the previous year) by an anonymous author (edited by Ernst Kummer) in the monthly notice of the academy. Peters is considered the authority of the taxon. According to Bauer, Günther, and Klipfel in 1995 the holotype is ZMB7812, stored at the Berlin Zoological Museum (ZMB), however the ZMB itself has the holotype specimen being ZMB133470.

In 1877 the famous US fossil baron Edward Drinker Cope, having received a frog specimen from somewhere on the west coast of Central America (fide Cochran (1961)), described it as Lithodytes pelviculus. This specimen is preserved as USNM32326 according to Darrel R. Frost, Noble has it as USNM3236. In 1881 Paul Brocchi reclassified this taxon under the genus Hylodes. In 1893 Cope described the frog a second time as a new species under the name Lithodytes florulentus, having acquired a single juvenile specimen, with the head damaged, from the "Boruca" in the canton of Buenos Aires in Puntarenas Province of the southern Pacific zone of Costa Rica, from one G. K. Cherrie. Unfortunately the type specimen for this taxon is lost (fide Savage and Myers (2002)). Albert Günther, working in Britain, moved this new taxon to Hylodes a few years later, in 1900, and produced the first comprehensive check-lists for the countries of the region. At this time, H. rugosus was only known from Panama and Nicaragua, but suspected to occur in Costa Rica, whilst H. megacephalus, a frog also named by Cope from Costa Rica, was commonly considered extant here, and H. florulentus was still known from Cope's single specimen from the eastern highlands. According to Günther, H. pelviculus was a synonym of H. megacephalus.

Thus, by the turn of the previous century what is presently (2019) understood as this frog species consisted of two taxa and one mixed taxon, and in 1904 the Norwegian herpetologist Leonhard Stejneger moved them all to the genus Eleutherodactylus. In the second half of 1916, during the United States occupation of Nicaragua and in the midst of an anti-imperialist civil war, an American herpetological and ichthyological expedition was mounted to obtain new specimens for US museums. As such, the expedition members returned without incident by early the next year, and the Harvard student Gladwyn Kingsley Noble set about describing the amphibians amongst their many collections. A series of thirty-one specimens were ascribed by him to belong to this taxon. He concluded that E. rugosus was simply the immature form of what was hereto known as E. megacephalus, believing that the darker colour of E. rugosus would lighten to that of E. megacephalus (in this collection there were some small individuals with light colour, but Noble does not explain this), and that the lack of cranial crest ornamentation in specimens previously identified as E. rugosus was simply a due to immaturity: according to him larger specimens of E. rugosus showed developing crests. As E. rugosus was the older name, and E. megacephalus the junior synonym, Noble considered E. rugosus the correct name, although it appears that many later authors preferred Cope's E. megacephalus. Noble agreed with Günther in that E. pelviculus was a synonym of E. megacephalus, and also mentioned the possible synonymy of yet another Cope taxon, E. gulosus - a rare, curiously large taxon only known at the time from the initial collection, although he did not formally synonymise this taxon as well. In 1921 Emmett Dunn collected what was thought to be the first specimen of E. rugosus known from Costa Rica near the town of Monteverde, himself and Tom Barbour not agreeing with Noble's synonymy. Fritz Nieden also ignored Noble in his contribution to the second edition of Das Tierreich (book 46) in 1923.

Between 1947 and 1951 Richard Clark Taylor and Edward Harrison Taylor visited Costa Rica for a combined total of 8 1/2 months, and the two men amassed a collection of over 6,000 herpetology specimens, more than the total that had been harvested from the country in the previous centuries. In his report on the amphibians of the country based on this collection, the latter Taylor follows Noble in considering E. megacephalus to be a synonym E. rugosus, however Taylor expresses some doubt as to if E. pelviculus and E. gulosus could truly be synonymised with E. rugosus, both based on such a paucity of unclear evidence.

Throughout most of 20th century this species was considered to be two accepted species under Stejneger's Eleutherodactylus taxonomy: E. florulentus (still only known from a single damaged specimen, missing since the 19th century) and E. rugosus (at the time a mix of both modern E. rugosus and modern E. megacephalus, and thought to be distributed from Honduras (perhaps even Mexico) to Panama), but in 1975 John D. Lynch synonymised both E. florulentus and E. rugosus, along with the older nomen E. pelviculus and E. megacephalus, and the mysterious E. gulosus (also still only known from the initial collections at the time), with E. biporcatus -under which the frogs of this species were known for the next few decades, and which was henceforth thought to be distributed from Honduras to Peru.

In 2002 Savage and Myers reassessed E. biporcatus, searching for the type specimens of the various synonyms in Berlin. They were unable to locate some (see above), but managed to discover that the actual holotype for E. biporcatus had been collected in Venezuela, not in Veraguas Province as had been thought previously. This meant that E. maussi, as a Venezuelan taxon of frogs was known at the time, was in fact a junior synonym of E. biporcatus. Due to this, Savage and Myers split the old E. biporcatus into three resurrected taxa and one new species (E. opimus). Savage and Myers also synonymised E. florulentus and E. pelviculus with the earliest name; Peters' E. rugosus described in Germany in 1873, as Günther had first partially suggested over a century earlier. Not everyone accepted these changes however, Crawford and Smith moved E. florulentus to Craugastor florulentus in 2005, and Frost et al. recognised C. florulentus in 2006. In 2014 Frost accepted Savage and Myers' 2002 synonymy.

=== Interspecific taxonomy ===
It was formerly classified in the family Leptodactylidae but as of 2014 is placed in the family Craugastoridae.

In 1989 Stephen Blair Hedges classified Eleutherodactylus florulentus, as specimens of this species were known at the time, in the subgenus Craugastor. In 2008 Hedges, Duellman and Heinicke also classified C. rugosus in the subgenus Craugastor.

Savage includes this species in his Eleutherodactylus fitzingeri series, E. biporcatus group in 2002. Hedges, Duellman and Heinicke place it in their Craugastor gulosus series in 2008. Padial, Grant and Frost classify it under their C. punctariolus series in 2014.

== Description ==
These are relatively big rain frogs with a large head (females to 69 mm (2.7 in) in snout–vent length, males to 44 mm (1.7 in)). The eyes have a black iris and the upper eyelid is covered in warts and bumps. There are crests just behind the eyes. The dorsum (back) is covered in warts and the creature appears much like a toad. There are hourglass-shaped ridges on the upper back, these are lined in lighter coloured stripes. There is no webbing between the digits of the limbs. The dorsum is dark brown, dark grey, or black in colour. The ventral surface of the animal is mottled brown with white and red. The ventral surfaces of the thighs may be either yellowish or orange. The inner thighs are ornamented with alternating bars of black and bright scarlet red; the black bars continue to the dorsal surface of the thighs. The groin has bright white and black marks.

The juveniles are coloured differently than the adults: the dorsal warts are tipped in white at first but darken with age, the inner thighs are barred with white and black, and the ventral surfaces of the legs and groin are orange-red.

According to Noble, it has a noticeably thicker and more robust stomach wall than other species of Eleutherodactylus (now split into Craugastor and other genera), but he was dissecting a mix of different species, mostly C. megacephalus, in order to describe C. rugosus.

This frog is thought likely to not make a mating call. It has a karyotype of 2n= 20.

=== Similar species ===
It is easily told apart from most species of Craugastor which occur in the same region by the head being broader than long. The most similar species are C. megacephalus and C. gulosus, but both are much larger species. C. opimus from South America is also very similar, but does not occur sympatrically.

== Distribution ==
Although the distribution of this species at present is believed to be mostly restricted to eastern Costa Rica, initially it was in fact believed not to occur in this country and to exist in two disjunct populations in Nicaragua and Panama, this situation persisting until at least 1923 (fide Fritz Nieden).

According to Savage (2002) and Frost (2015), Craugastor rugosus is now found on the slopes and lowlands facing the Pacific from the downstream region of the Rio Carara in Costa Rica southwards to the southern part of far western Panama. However, it is possible that the distribution of this species in fact stretches further north and east than indicated, although the history of taxonomic confusion makes it complicated to ascertain. Henry Sterling Blair collected a specimen for the Museum of Comparative Zoology (MCZ) at Harvard University in Zent, Limón Province, Costa Rica, in 1996. During the time Nicaragua was occupied by the USA, of the 31 specimens formerly thought to be C. rugosus two specimens which were collected at what the Americans called "Tuli Creek" in 1916 (the Tule River in south of San Miguelito in Río San Juan Department), are still labelled as such, also kept at the MCZ, and the MCZ furthermore has a specimen said to be collected in 1992 at the Escondido River near Bluefields in Nicaragua.

It is seen in Costa Rica in the Carara National Park, the Fila Chonta mountains, the Osa Peninsula and in the harbour town of Quepos, all in Puntarenas Province.

== Ecology ==
This frog can be found in humid and hot tropical lowland rainforests, moist premontane forest, secondary forest, plantations and heavily altered former forest habitats. It is usually found amongst the leaf litter of the forest. It has been seen hopping on the forest floor during the day. According to Savage (2002) it is found at altitudes from 10 m (33 ft) to 1,220 m (4,000 ft) above sea level.

It is likely an ambush predator which generally preys on beetles, but may also attack lizards and other frogs.

== Conservation ==
According to the IUCN it was threatened by habitat loss in 2004. Protected populations occur in Carara National Park, Río Piro Wildlife Refuge, Corcovado National Park, Maquenque National Wildlife Refuge (from 0–2,370 m (0–7,776 ft)), and at least historically in the Monteverde Cloud Forest Reserve area.
