= Banded frog =

Banded frog may refer to:

- Banded banana frog (Afrixalus fulvovittatus), a frog in the family Hyperoliidae found in Ivory Coast, Ghana, Guinea, Liberia, and Sierra Leone
- Banded bull frog (Kaloula pulchra), a frog in the family Microhylidae native to Southeast Asia
- Banded rubber frog (Phrynomantis bifasciatus), a frog in the family Microhylidae found in Angola, Botswana, Democratic Republic of the Congo, Eswatini, Kenya, Malawi, Mozambique, Namibia, Somalia, South Africa, Tanzania, Zambia, and Zimbabwe
- Gunther's banded tree frog (Hypsiboas fasciatus), a frog in the family Hylidae found in Bolivia, Brazil, Colombia, Ecuador, French Guiana, Guyana, Peru, Suriname, and possibly Venezuela

== See also ==
- Black-banded frog or Black-banded robber frog (Hypodactylus nigrovittatus), a frog in the family Craugastoridae found in Colombia, Ecuador, Peru, and possibly Brazil
- Broad-banded frog (disambiguation), either of two species of Ptychadena frogs in the family Ptychadenidae found in Africa
