= Inger's frog =

Inger's frog is a common name for several species of frogs and may refer to:

- Inger's robber frog (Strabomantis ingeri), species in the family Craugastoridae found in Colombia and possibly Venezuela
- Inger's wart frog (Limnonectes ingeri), species in the family Dicroglossidae found in Borneo
