= P. nanus =

P. nanus may refer to:

- Philautus nanus, an extinct frog species endemic to Sri Lanka
- Phrynobatrachus nanus, a frog species found in Chad and possibly Central African Republic
- Phrynopus nanus, a frog species endemic to Colombia
- Physalaemus nanus, a frog species endemic to Brazil
- Pleurocoelus nanus, a dinosaur species from the Early Cretaceous found in North America
- Pseudomys nanus, the western chestnut mouse, a rodent species found only in Australia
- Pyrgulopsis nanus, the distal-gland springsnail, a freshwater snail species

== See also ==
- Nanus (disambiguation)
