= Niceforonia columbiana =

Conservation status
- Data Deficient (IUCN 3.1)

Scientific classification
- Kingdom: Animalia
- Phylum: Chordata
- Class: Amphibia
- Order: Anura
- Clade: Brachycephaloidea
- Family: Craugastoridae
- Genus: Niceforonia
- Species: N. columbiana

Binomial name
- Niceforonia columbiana (Werner, 1899)

Synonyms
- Borborocoetes columbianus Werner, 1899; Phrynopus columbianus (Werner, 1899)

Species of frog

Niceforonia columbiana is a species of frog in the family Strabomantidae, sometimes known as the Colombian Andes frog. It is endemic to Colombia. It is only known from the holotype, which is now lost. The type locality, "Monte Redondo, Buenavista" on the Cordillera Oriental, is in either Cundinamarca or Meta Department, and is considered questionable by some. It might be a synonym of Leptodactylus hylaedactylus (=Adenomera hylaedactyla).

The type locality is at 1,000–1,300 m (3,300–4,300 ft) asl, probably a cloud forest. This contrasts with the higher-altitude paramo habitats of the other two Niceforonia species. There is habitat loss in the area.
