= Niceforonia brunnea =

Conservation status
- Endangered (IUCN 3.1)

Scientific classification
- Kingdom: Animalia
- Phylum: Chordata
- Class: Amphibia
- Order: Anura
- Family: Strabomantidae
- Genus: Niceforonia
- Species: N. brunnea

Binomial name
- Niceforonia brunnea (Lynch, 1975)

Synonyms
- Phrynopus brunneus Lynch, 1975; Hypodactylus brunneus (Lynch, 1975)

Species of amphibian

Niceforonia brunnea, the Carchi Andes frog, is a species of frog in the family Strabomantidae. It is found on the Andes of southern Colombia (Colombian Massif: Nariño Department) and northern Ecuador (Carchi and Imbabura Provinces). The specific name brunnea refers to its drab, brown coloration.

== Description ==
Adult males measure 26–28 mm (1.0–1.1 in) and adult females, based on a single specimen, 30 mm (1.2 in) in snout–vent length. The head is wider than it is long but narrower than the body. The snout is rounded. The tympanum is visible and the supratympanic fold is thick, partly obscuring the tympanum. The fingers and toes have no fringes nor webbing. The tips of the digits are rounded, without dilation. Preserved specimens are dorsally brown with indistinct darker mottling. The ventral surfaces are paler, varying from dusky gray to brown. Living specimens are similarly drab.

== Habitat and conservation ==
Niceforonia brunnea occurs in high-Andean forest and páramo at elevations of 2,950–4,100 m (9,680–13,450 ft) above sea level. The type series was collected from under logs in a wet pasture. They have also been found in holes. Development is direct (i.e., there is no free-living larval stage).

Niceforonia brunnea can be locally common, but it is suspected that the overall population is declining. The major threat to it is habitat loss and degradation caused by the expansion of agricultural activities (illegal crops and livestock). Pollution from the use of agrochemicals is also a threat. It is present in at least one protected area.
