= Niceforonia araiodactyla =

Conservation status
- Endangered (IUCN 3.1)

Scientific classification
- Kingdom: Animalia
- Phylum: Chordata
- Class: Amphibia
- Order: Anura
- Clade: Brachycephaloidea
- Family: Craugastoridae
- Genus: Niceforonia
- Species: N. araiodactyla

Binomial name
- Niceforonia araiodactyla (Duellman & Pramuk, 1999)

Synonyms
- Eleutherodactylus araiodactylus Duellman & Pramuk, 1999; Hypodactylus araiodactylus (Duellman & Pramuk, 1999)

Species of frog

Niceforonia araiodactyla is a species of frog in the family Strabomantidae endemic to Peru. Its natural habitat is subtropical or tropical high-altitude shrubland.
