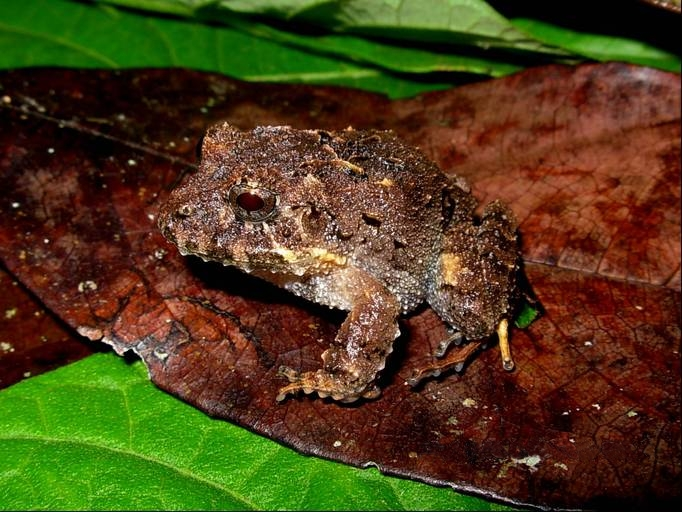
- Strabomantis biporcatus

Scientific classification
- Kingdom: Animalia
- Phylum: Chordata
- Class: Amphibia
- Order: Anura
- Clade: Brachycephaloidea
- Family: Craugastoridae
- Subfamily: Strabomantinae
- Genus: Strabomantis; Peters, 1863

Type species
- Strabomantis biporcatus Peters, 1863

Species
- 16, see text

Synonyms
- Limnophys Jiménez de la Espada, 1870; Ctenocranius Melin, 1941; Amblyphrynus Cochran and Goin, 1961

= Strabomantis =

Genus of amphibians

Strabomantis is a genus of frogs in the subfamily Strabomantinae. At times these frogs have been included in the large genus Eleutherodactylus. They are distributed from Costa Rica southwards to northern South America.

== Species ==
There are 16 species in this genus:

- Strabomantis anatipes (Lynch and Myers, 1983)
- Strabomantis anomalus (Boulenger, 1898)
- Strabomantis biporcatus Peters, 1863
- Strabomantis bufoniformis (Boulenger, 1896)
- Strabomantis cadenai (Lynch, 1986)
- Strabomantis cerastes (Lynch, 1975)
- Strabomantis cheiroplethus (Lynch, 1990)
- Strabomantis cornutus (Jiménez de la Espada, 1870)
- Strabomantis helonotus (Lynch, 1975)
- Strabomantis ingeri (Cochran and Goin, 1961)
- Strabomantis laticorpus (Myers and Lynch, 1997)
- Strabomantis necerus (Lynch, 1975)
- Strabomantis necopinus (Lynch, 1997)
- Strabomantis ruizi (Lynch, 1981)
- Strabomantis sulcatus (Cope, 1874)
- Strabomantis zygodactylus (Lynch and Myers, 1983)
