= Strabomantis necerus =

Conservation status
- Critically Endangered (IUCN 3.1)

Scientific classification
- Kingdom: Animalia
- Phylum: Chordata
- Class: Amphibia
- Order: Anura
- Clade: Brachycephaloidea
- Family: Craugastoridae
- Genus: Strabomantis
- Species: S. necerus

Binomial name
- Strabomantis necerus (Lynch, 1975)

Synonyms
- Eleutherodactylus necerus Lynch, 1975; Craugastor necerus (Lynch, 1975)

Species of amphibian

Strabomantis necerus, also known as the Mindo robber frog or hornless groundfrog, is a species of frog in the family Strabomantidae. It is found on the lower Pacific slopes of the Andes from Cotopaxi Province northward to Carchi Province, Ecuador, and Valle del Cauca Department, Colombia.

It is a rare frog inhabiting humid premontane forest, typically in the immediate vicinity of streams. It is threatened by habitat loss caused by agriculture and logging; agricultural pollution is also a threat. Strabomantis necerus has not been seen in Ecuador since 1995 and might be extinct there. Colombian record is based on re-examining a series of museum specimens, where it had been mixed with Strabomantis bufoniformis; the current status of that population is unknown.
