= Strabomantis cheiroplethus =

Conservation status
- Endangered (IUCN 3.1)

Scientific classification
- Kingdom: Animalia
- Phylum: Chordata
- Class: Amphibia
- Order: Anura
- Clade: Brachycephaloidea
- Family: Craugastoridae
- Genus: Strabomantis
- Species: S. cheiroplethus

Binomial name
- Strabomantis cheiroplethus (Lynch, 1990)

Synonyms
- Eleutherodactylus cheiroplethus Lynch, 1990; Craugastor cheiroplethus (Lynch, 1990)

Species of frog

Strabomantis cheiroplethus is a species of frog in the family Strabomantidae. It is endemic to Colombia and found on the western slopes of the northern half of the Cordillera Occidental (Antioquia, Chocó, Risaralda and Valle del Cauca Departments).

Strabomantis cheiroplethus is a relatively abundant species, though believed to declining. It inhabits rainforest and can be found along streams. It is able to tolerate considerable habitat modification as long as gallery forest over stream is present. It is locally threatened by habitat loss.
