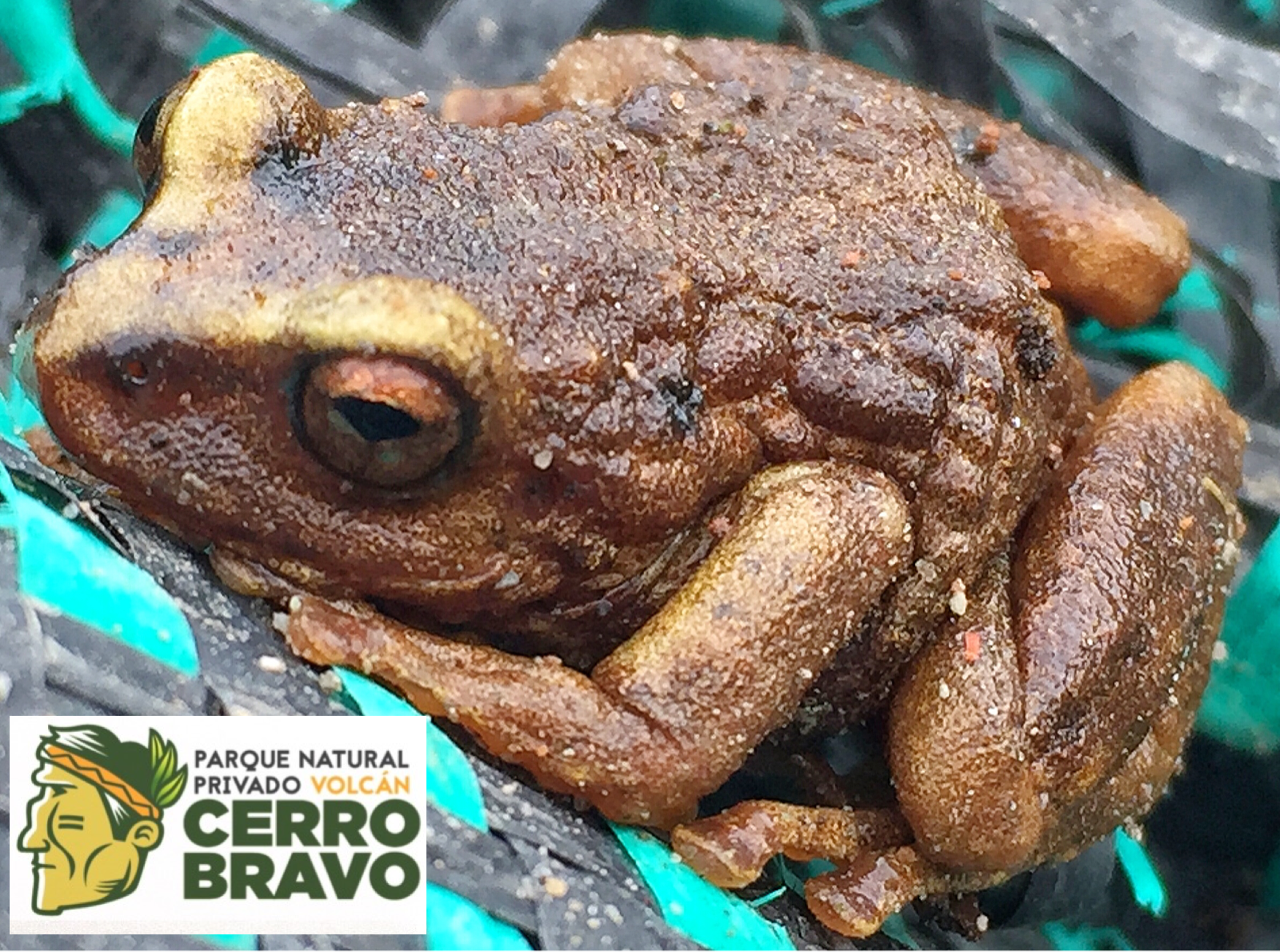

Conservation status
- Endangered (IUCN 3.1)

Scientific classification
- Kingdom: Animalia
- Phylum: Chordata
- Class: Amphibia
- Order: Anura
- Clade: Brachycephaloidea
- Family: Craugastoridae
- Genus: Niceforonia
- Species: N. adenobrachia

Binomial name
- Niceforonia adenobrachia (Ardila-Robayo, Ruiz-Carranza, and Barrera-Rodriguez, 1996)

Synonyms
- Phrynopus adenobrachius Ardila-Robayo, Ruiz-Carranza, and Barrera-Rodriguez, 1996

= Niceforonia adenobrachia =

Species of frog

Niceforonia adenobrachia is a species of frog in the family Strabomantidae. It is endemic to the Cordillera Central, Colombia, in the Caldas and Tolima Departments.

Niceforonia adenobrachia occurs in sub-páramo and páramo habitats at 3,100–3,400 m (10,200–11,200 ft) asl. It is threatened by the burning of páramo for cattle grazing.
