= Niceforonia fallaciosa =

Conservation status
- Data Deficient (IUCN 3.1)

Scientific classification
- Kingdom: Animalia
- Phylum: Chordata
- Class: Amphibia
- Order: Anura
- Family: Strabomantidae
- Genus: Niceforonia
- Species: N. fallaciosa

Binomial name
- Niceforonia fallaciosa (Duellman, 2000)

Synonyms
- Phrynopus fallaciosus Duellman, 2000; Hypodactylus fallaciosus (Duellman, 2000)

Species of frog

Niceforonia fallaciosa is a species of frog in the family Strabomantidae. It is endemic to Peru. Its natural habitat is subtropical or tropical moist montane forests.
