= Strabomantis necopinus =

Conservation status
- Vulnerable (IUCN 3.1)

Scientific classification
- Kingdom: Animalia
- Phylum: Chordata
- Class: Amphibia
- Order: Anura
- Clade: Brachycephaloidea
- Family: Craugastoridae
- Genus: Strabomantis
- Species: S. necopinus

Binomial name
- Strabomantis necopinus (Lynch, 1997)

Synonyms
- Eleutherodactylus necopinus Lynch, 1997

Species of frog

Strabomantis necopinus is a species of frog in the family Strabomantidae. It is endemic to the Cordillera Central in Colombia, where it is known from Antioquia, Caldas, Risaralda, Quindío, and Tolima Departments at elevations of 1,800–2,200 m (5,900–7,200 ft) asl.

The natural habitat of Strabomantis necopinus is primary cloud forest with abundant fallen leaves on the ground. It is a terrestrial and diurnal species. It is threatened by habitat loss caused by logging and agricultural development.
