= Niceforonia peraccai =

Conservation status
- Endangered (IUCN 3.1)

Scientific classification
- Kingdom: Animalia
- Phylum: Chordata
- Class: Amphibia
- Order: Anura
- Clade: Brachycephaloidea
- Family: Craugastoridae
- Genus: Niceforonia
- Species: N. peraccai

Binomial name
- Niceforonia peraccai (Lynch, 1975)

Synonyms
- Phrynopus peraccai Lynch, 1975; Hypodactylus peraccai (Lynch, 1975)

Species of amphibian

Niceforonia peraccai is a species of frog in the family Strabomantidae that is endemic to Ecuador. Its natural habitats are subtropical or tropical moist montane forests, subtropical or tropical high-altitude shrubland, and subtropical or tropical high-altitude grassland. It is threatened by habitat loss.
