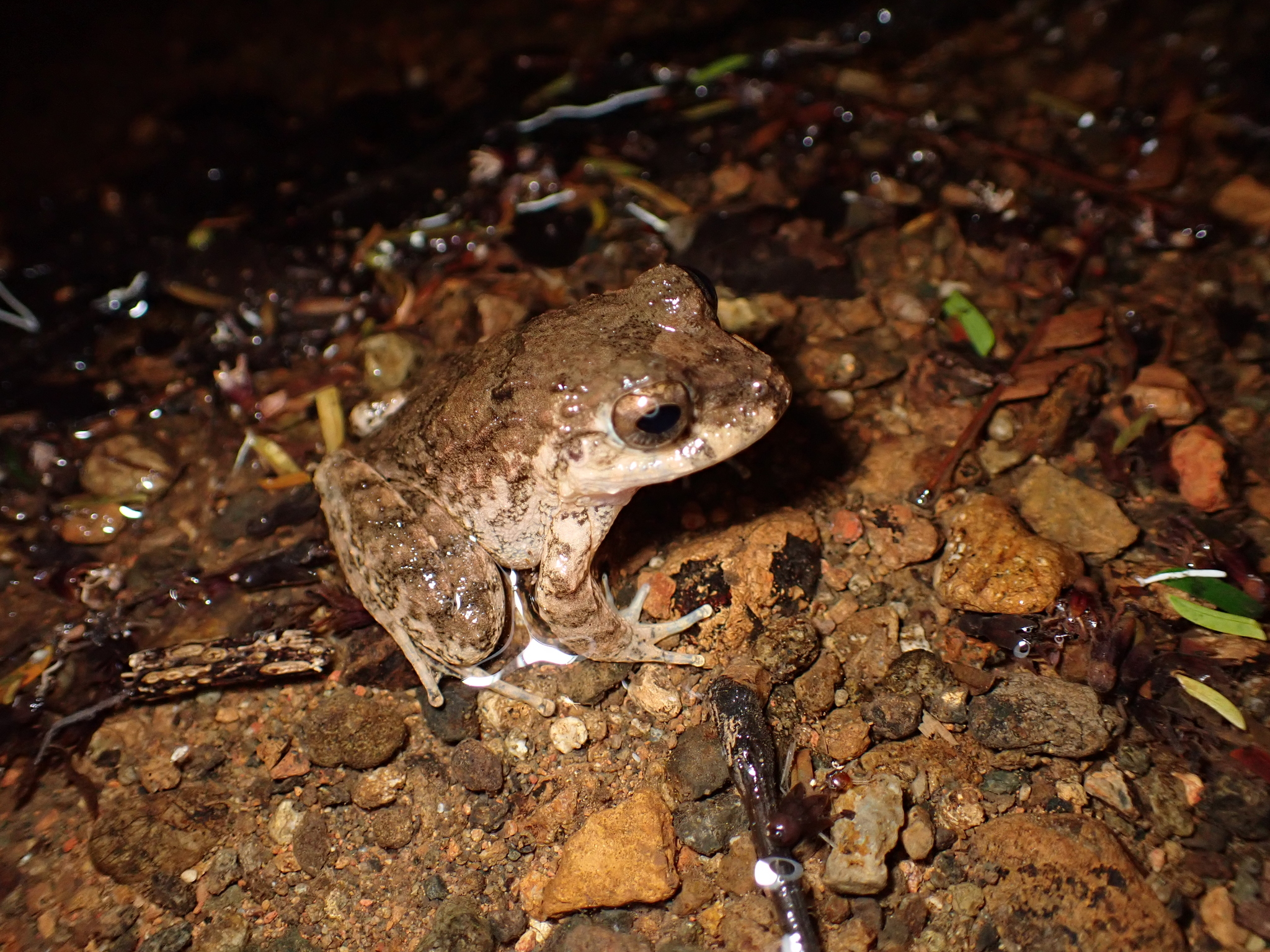

Conservation status
- Least Concern (IUCN 3.1)

Scientific classification
- Kingdom: Animalia
- Phylum: Chordata
- Class: Amphibia
- Order: Anura
- Family: Craugastoridae
- Genus: Strabomantis
- Species: S. anomalus

Binomial name
- Strabomantis anomalus (Boulenger, 1898)

Synonyms
- Hylodes anomalus Boulenger, 1898; Eleutherodactylus anomalus (Boulenger, 1896); Craugastor anomalus (Boulenger, 1896)

= Strabomantis anomalus =

Species of amphibian

Strabomantis anomalus is a species of frogs in the family Strabomantidae. It is found in the Chocoan rainforests from near sea level to elevations of 1,180 m (3,870 ft) in northwestern Ecuador and western Colombia.

== Description ==
Strabomantis anomalus are large frogs. Males measure 32–61 mm (1.3–2.4 in) and females 77–92 mm (3.0–3.6 in) in snout–vent length. Skin of dorsum is coarsely tuberculate with many short ridges and folds, but without complete dorsolateral folds. They are dull grayish brown, yellowish brown, or brown from above, with indistinct darker blotching. Groin is variably mottled brown or black on pale yellow, yellowish tan, or pink. Rear of thigh are dark brown or black, with yellow or tan mottling or spots. Throat is suffused with brown or gray, with white spots or mottling, but sometimes darker, mottled black and white, in juveniles. Venter is dull white or yellowish white to pale yellow, or, occasionally, bright, yellow.

On one occasion, a female was found crouched on a mass of 69 eggs in a shallow depression. The nest was on a river bank, likely to be flooded at the next heavy rain, which is unusual for presumed direct-developing species.

== Habitat and conservation ==
Natural habitats of Strabomantis anomalus are lowland and submontane forests. They live mainly along clear, gravely streams flowing through swampy moist rainforest. They are commonly found along small, slow-flowing streams at night, usually on the ground or on rocks beside or in shallow water in the stream.

Strabomantis anomalus can be locally a moderately common species. It is believed to be declining in abundance. Habitat loss caused by agricultural development, logging, and human settlement is probably the main threat to it. Also pollution from spraying illegal crops is a significant threat.
