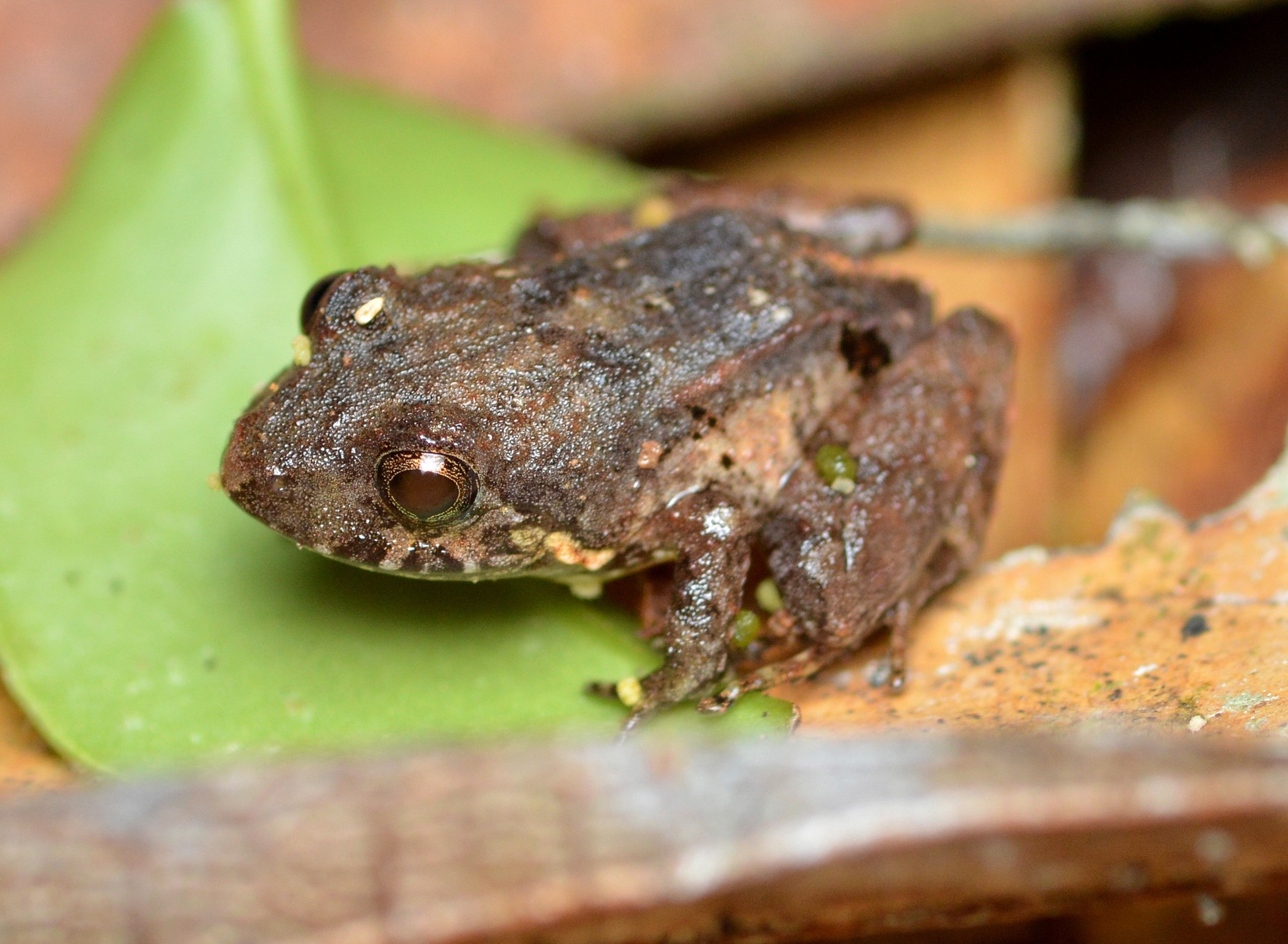
- Niceforonia nigrovittata

Scientific classification
- Kingdom: Animalia
- Phylum: Chordata
- Class: Amphibia
- Order: Anura
- Clade: Brachycephaloidea
- Family: Craugastoridae
- Subfamily: Hypodactylinae
- Genus: Niceforonia; Goin and Cochran, 1963

Type species
- Niceforonia nana Goin and Cochran, 1963

Diversity
- See text)

Synonyms
- Isodactylus Hedges, Duellman, and Heinicke, 2008; Hypodactylus Hedges, Duellman, and Heinicke, 2008

= Niceforonia =

Genus of amphibians

Niceforonia is a genus of frogs in the family Strabomantidae found in northern South America (from central Peru to Ecuador and Colombia). It is the only genus in the subfamily Hypodactylinae. The name refers to Nicéforo María, Colombian herpetologist.

== Taxonomy ==
The genus Niceforonia was resurrected from the synonymy of Phrynopus by Hedges and colleagues in 2008. No genetic data exist, and Hedges et al. placed it provisionally in the subfamily Strabomantinae along with the genera Phrynopus, Oreobates, and Lynchius with which it shares a synapomorphy. Based on genetic data from these three genera, Padial and colleagues moved them all into the subfamily Holoadeninae in 2014.

=== Species ===
The following species are recognised in the genus Niceforonia:

- Niceforonia adenobrachia (Ardila-Robayo, Ruiz-Carranza, and Barrera-Rodriguez, 1996)
- Niceforonia aderca (Lynch, 2003)
- Niceforonia araiodactyla (Duellman and Pramuk, 1999)
- Niceforonia babax (Lynch, 1989)
- Niceforonia brunnea (Lynch, 1975)
- Niceforonia columbiana (Werner, 1899)
- Niceforonia dolops (Lynch and Duellman, 1980)
- Niceforonia elassodiscus (Lynch, 1973)
- Niceforonia fallaciosa (Duellman, 2000)
- Niceforonia latens (Lynch, 1989)
- Niceforonia lucida (Cannatella, 1984)
- Niceforonia mantipus (Boulenger, 1908)
- Niceforonia nana Goin and Cochran, 1963
- Niceforonia nigrovittata (Andersson, 1945)
- Niceforonia peraccai (Lynch, 1975)

== Description ==
Species of the genus Niceforonia are small frogs measuring up to 21 mm (0.83 in) in snout–vent length. The head is narrower than the body and the tympanic membrane is differentiated, but in some species only the tympanic annulus is visible under skin. The dorsum is smooth to weakly tuberculate, whereas the venter is smooth or areolate. The terminal discs on digits are not expanded but usually bear weak circumferential grooves. The terminal phalanges are narrow and T-shaped. Toes III and V are about equal in length (the origin of the name Isodactylus).
