= Strabomantis cornutus =

Rio Suno robber frog

Conservation status
- Vulnerable (IUCN 3.1)

Scientific classification
- Kingdom: Animalia
- Phylum: Chordata
- Class: Amphibia
- Order: Anura
- Family: Craugastoridae
- Genus: Strabomantis
- Species: S. cornutus

Binomial name
- Strabomantis cornutus (Jiménez de la Espada, 1870)

Synonyms
- Limnophys cornutus Jiménez de la Espada, 1870; Limnophys napaeus Jiménez de la Espada, 1870; Hylodes cornutus (Jiménez de la Espada, 1870); Ctenocranius cornutus (Jiménez de la Espada, 1870); Lithodytes cornutus (Jiménez de la Espada, 1870); Eleutherodactylus cornutus (Jiménez de la Espada, 1870)

Species of amphibian

Strabomantis cornutus is a species of frog in the family Strabomantidae. It is found along the eastern flank of the Andes of Ecuador and Colombia (Cordillera Oriental) north to Caquetá Department. Common name Rio Suno robber frog has been coined for it. It has been confused with other species (e.g., Strabomantis sulcatus).

== Description ==
Adult males measure about 36–43 mm (1.4–1.7 in) (based on two young males) and adult females at least 54 mm (2.1 in) in snout–vent length (size of a young female). The snout is truncate in lateral profile. The tympanum is prominent. Skin is prominently tuberculate dorsally and smooth ventrally. The eyelid bears 1–2 elongated tubercles. The finger and toe discs are small; the toes have lateral fringes but no webbing. The dorsum is dull reddish brown or dull olive-brown with black and reddish brown markings. The venter is dark brown or brown dotted with (grayish) white. The posterior surfaces of the thighs are black with white or blueish white flecks.

== Habitat and conservation ==
Strabomantis cornutus occurs in cloud forests at elevations of 1,150–1,800 m (3,770–5,910 ft) above sea level. It is largely a nocturnal and terrestrial species recorded on the forest floor and stream banks. It is a rare species threatened by habitat loss caused by agriculture, human settlement, and logging. It is known from the Podocarpus National Park (Ecuador) and its range overlaps with a few other protected areas.
