= Strabomantis laticorpus =

Conservation status
- Data Deficient (IUCN 3.1)

Scientific classification
- Kingdom: Animalia
- Phylum: Chordata
- Class: Amphibia
- Order: Anura
- Clade: Brachycephaloidea
- Family: Craugastoridae
- Genus: Strabomantis
- Species: S. laticorpus

Binomial name
- Strabomantis laticorpus (Myers & Lynch, 1997)

Synonyms
- Eleutherodactylus laticorpus Myers & Lynch, 1997

Species of frog

Strabomantis laticorpus is a species of frog in the family Strabomantidae. It is found in Panama and possibly Colombia. Its natural habitat is subtropical or tropical moist montane forest.
