= Strabomantis cadenai =

Conservation status
- Critically endangered, possibly extinct (IUCN 3.1)

Scientific classification
- Kingdom: Animalia
- Phylum: Chordata
- Class: Amphibia
- Order: Anura
- Clade: Brachycephaloidea
- Family: Craugastoridae
- Genus: Strabomantis
- Species: S. cadenai

Binomial name
- Strabomantis cadenai (Lynch, 1986)

Synonyms
- Eleutherodactylus cadenai Lynch, 1986

Species of amphibian

Strabomantis cadenai is a species of frog in the family Strabomantidae. It is endemic to Colombia. Its natural habitat is subtropical or tropical moist montane forest. It is threatened by habitat loss.
