= Niceforonia lucida =

Conservation status
- Endangered (IUCN 3.1)

Scientific classification
- Kingdom: Animalia
- Phylum: Chordata
- Class: Amphibia
- Order: Anura
- Clade: Brachycephaloidea
- Family: Craugastoridae
- Genus: Niceforonia
- Species: N. lucida

Binomial name
- Niceforonia lucida (Cannatella, 1984)

Synonyms
- Phrynopus lucida Cannatella, 1984; Eleutherodactylus lucida (Cannatella, 1984); Hypodactylus lucida (Cannatella, 1984)

Species of amphibian

Niceforonia lucida is a species of frog in the family Strabomantidae. It is endemic to Peru and known from the Cordillera Central west of the Apurímac River in the Ayacucho Region. Common name Cannatella's Andes frog has been coined for it. The specific name lucida refers to distinctive coloration of this frog relative to frogs in the genus Phrynopus, the genus where this species was initially placed. However, later studies have moved it to other genera where its colors are less distinctive.

== Description ==
Males measure 28–33 mm (1.1–1.3 in) and females 31–38 mm (1.2–1.5 in) in snout–vent length. The snout is subacuminate in dorsal view and sloping in lateral profile. The canthus rostralis is sharp and slightly concave. The tympanum is visible and the supratympanic fold is prominent. Skin of the dorsum is smooth or slightly areolate; skin of venter is smooth. The fingers and toes have weak lateral fringes. The finger tips bear narrow discs. The toe discs have circumferential grooves. The dorsum is dark gray to brown with dark brown to black markings. Some individuals have tan to orange dorsolateral stripes. The groin and concealed surfaces of hind limbs are pale, dull orange (orange-red in males). The venter is gray or creamy white with gray flecks. The iris is crimson.

== Habitat and conservation ==
Niceforonia lucida occurs in the wet paramo with puna grass, ferns, moss and lichens, and in upper humid montane forest at elevations of 2,970–3,710 m (9,740–12,170 ft) above sea level. Specimens have been found at day under rocks. The species is threatened by habitat loss, primarily caused by clearance of land for agriculture.
