= Carara National Park =

Park in Costa Rica

- IUCN category II (national park)
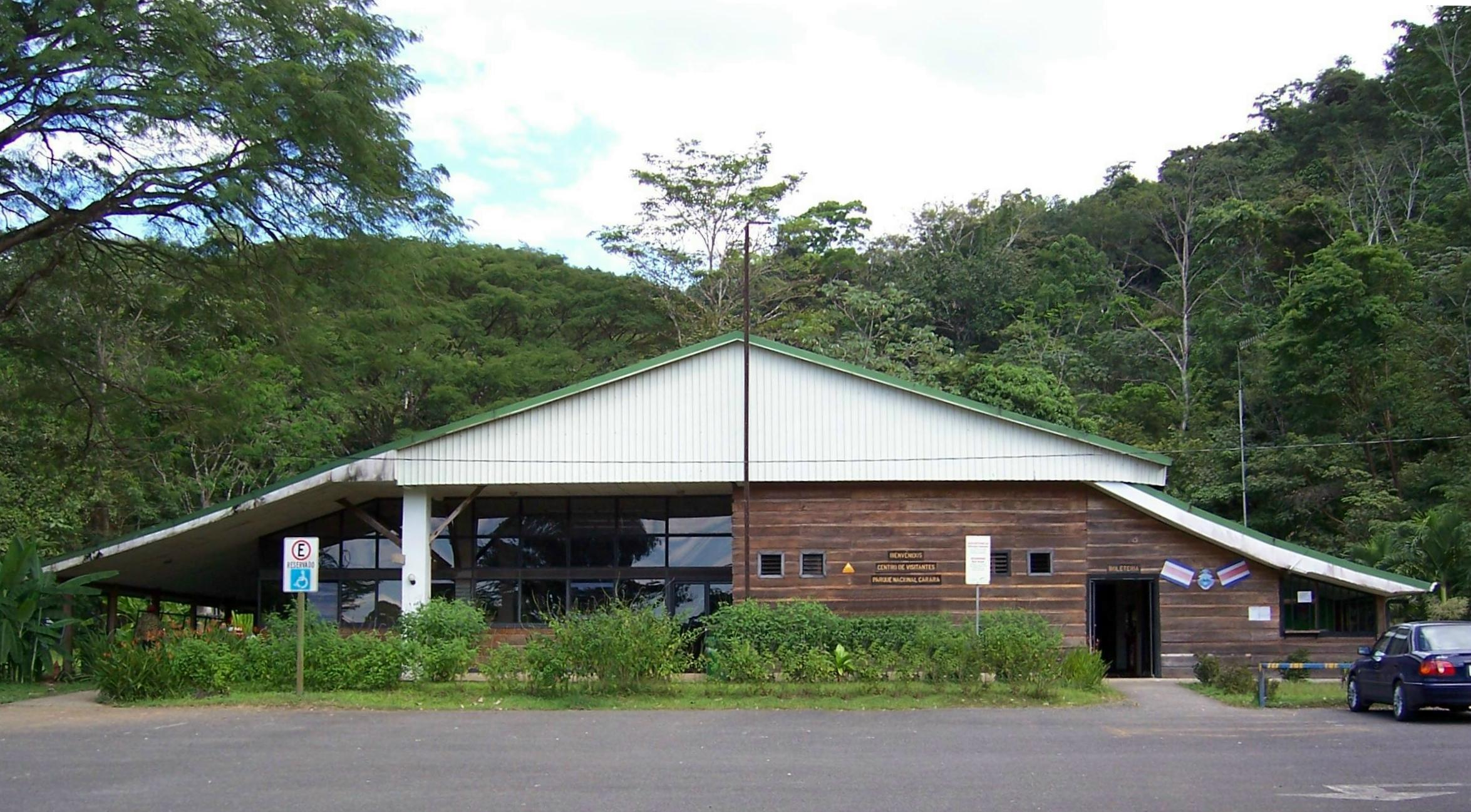
- Entrance
- Carara National Park area.
- Location: Costa Rica
- Coordinates: 9°44′50″N 84°37′40″W
- Area: 52 km^{2} (20 sq mi)
- Established: 1978
- Governing body: National System of Conservation Areas (SINAC)
- Location in Costa Rica

Carara National Park is a national park in the Central Pacific Conservation Area located near the Pacific coast of Costa Rica. It was established on 27 April 1978 as a biological reserve, but its growing popularity after 1990 forced the government to upgrade its category to national park in November 1998.

Carara lies about 48 km (30 mi) west of the Costa Rican capital of San José and about 24 km (15 mi) miles north of the beach town of Jacó. The park protects the river basin of the River Tárcoles, near Orotina and includes the second-largest remaining populations of wild scarlet macaws in the country.

== Biodiversity ==
Carara National Park contains more primary rainforest than the relatively close Manuel Antonio National Park. As such, it is wetter than the more popular Manuel Antonio National Park, and has denser tree growth and more mosquitoes and other insects. This environment makes Carara a haven for many bird species making it one of the best parks for birdwatching in the entire country with a staggering number of 432 confirmed species. In addition to scarlet macaws, birds found in Carara include orange-chinned parakeets and other parrots, hummingbirds, woodpeckers, motmots, jacamars, manakins, antbirds, and several species of trogon, including the Northern black-throated trogon. Several species of water birds inhabit the park as well. These include the anhinga, several species of heron, egret and kingfishers.

Among the reptiles present in the park are the American crocodile and several snake and lizard species. The Tarcoles River, which forms the northern boundary of the park, is inhabited by crocodiles throughout most of the year., the park has the largest population of Central America crocodiles and 52 species of snakes and other reptiles such as lizards, geckos, etc. The American crocodile is classified as Vulnerable on the IUCN Red List.

Green and black poison arrow frogs are among the amphibians present. Mammals include white-tailed deer, red brockets, collared peccaries, agouti, kinkajous, Panamanian white-faced capuchin monkeys, mantled howler monkeys, Hoffmann's two-toed sloths and brown-throated three-toed sloths, white-nosed coatis and the recently rediscovered pumas, However, mammals can be difficult to see due to the dense tree cover.

Carara is included within the "Tárcoles, Carara and La Cangreja" Important Bird Area (IBA) recognised by BirdLife International under criteria A1 and A2.

== Resources ==
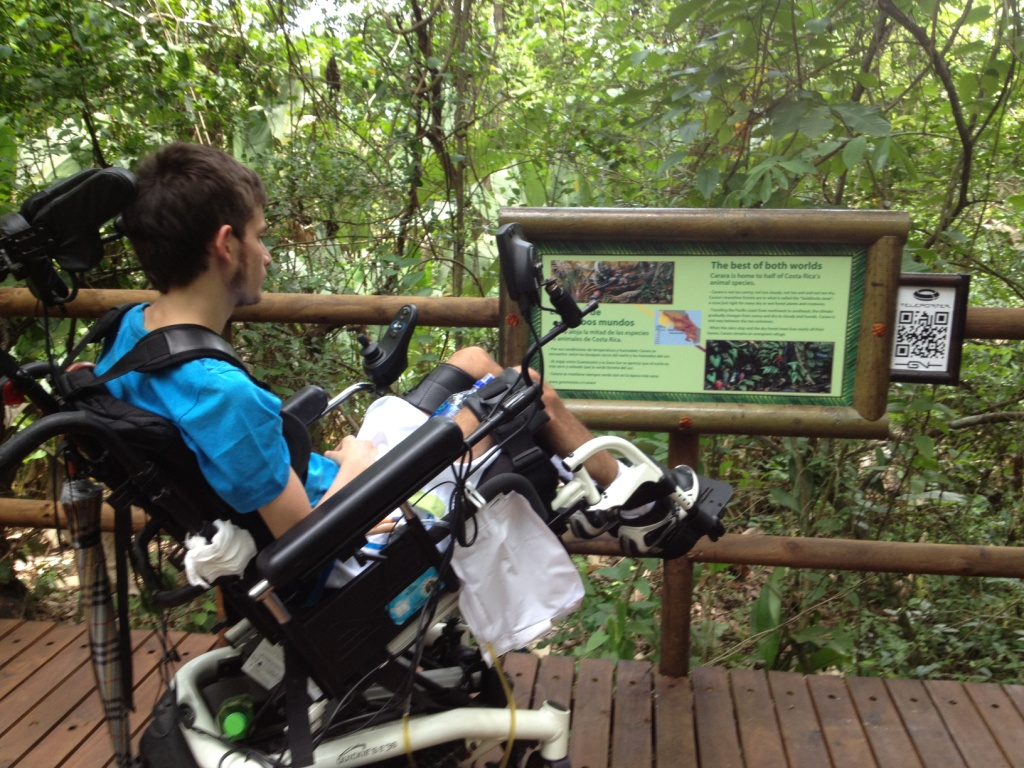
A student in the park.

The Carara National Park universal footpath has a wide range of audio-visual and haptic resources using advanced technology to facilitate easy access for people with disabilities. Designed by architect Ibo Bonilla and built by popular contribution, the park has facilitative features such as animal sculptures, haptic maps, Braille signs, etc.

The tour around the park has slopes less than 6%, areas with benches for rest, park information booths, and special health services.

== Archeological sites ==
Carara National Park has fifteen pre-Columbian archaeological sites belonging to the archaeological area of the Central Region of Costa Rica, corresponding to two periods of occupation: the "Pavas" period (300 BC to 300 AD) and the "Cartago" period (800-1500 AD).

Two sites stand out in the park. The first is characterized by the presence of a rectangular base measuring 6 x 4 meters, corresponding to the "Cartago" period. It is built of limestone and river rocks. Another important site is Hills Burial, which is a large residential village and burial area located on a hill facing the "Tárcoles River". It is believed that this village exerted political and economic dominance on the lower part of this river.

== Gallery ==
Biodiversity at Carara National Park
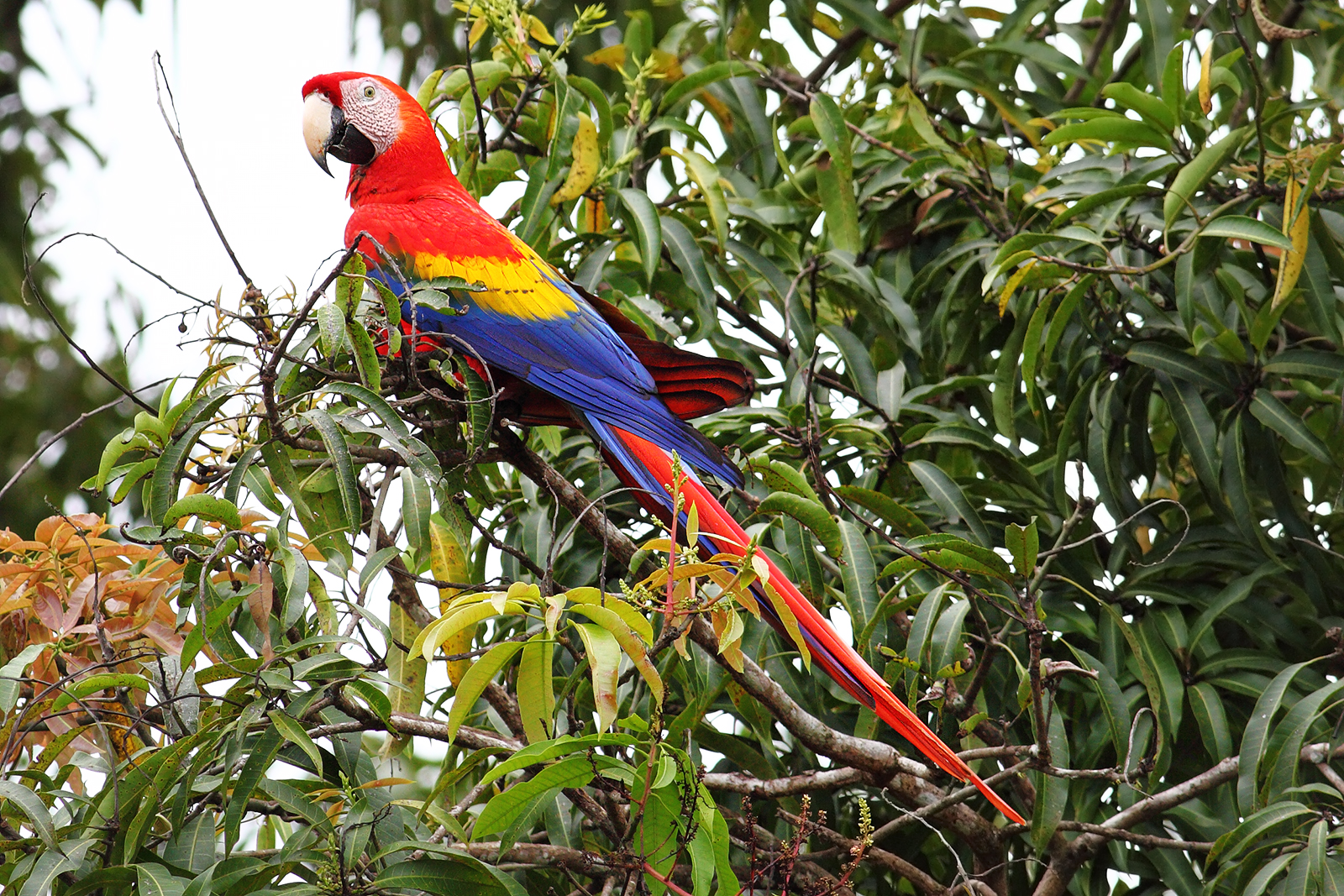
Scarlet macaws are one of the chief attractions in Carara National Park.

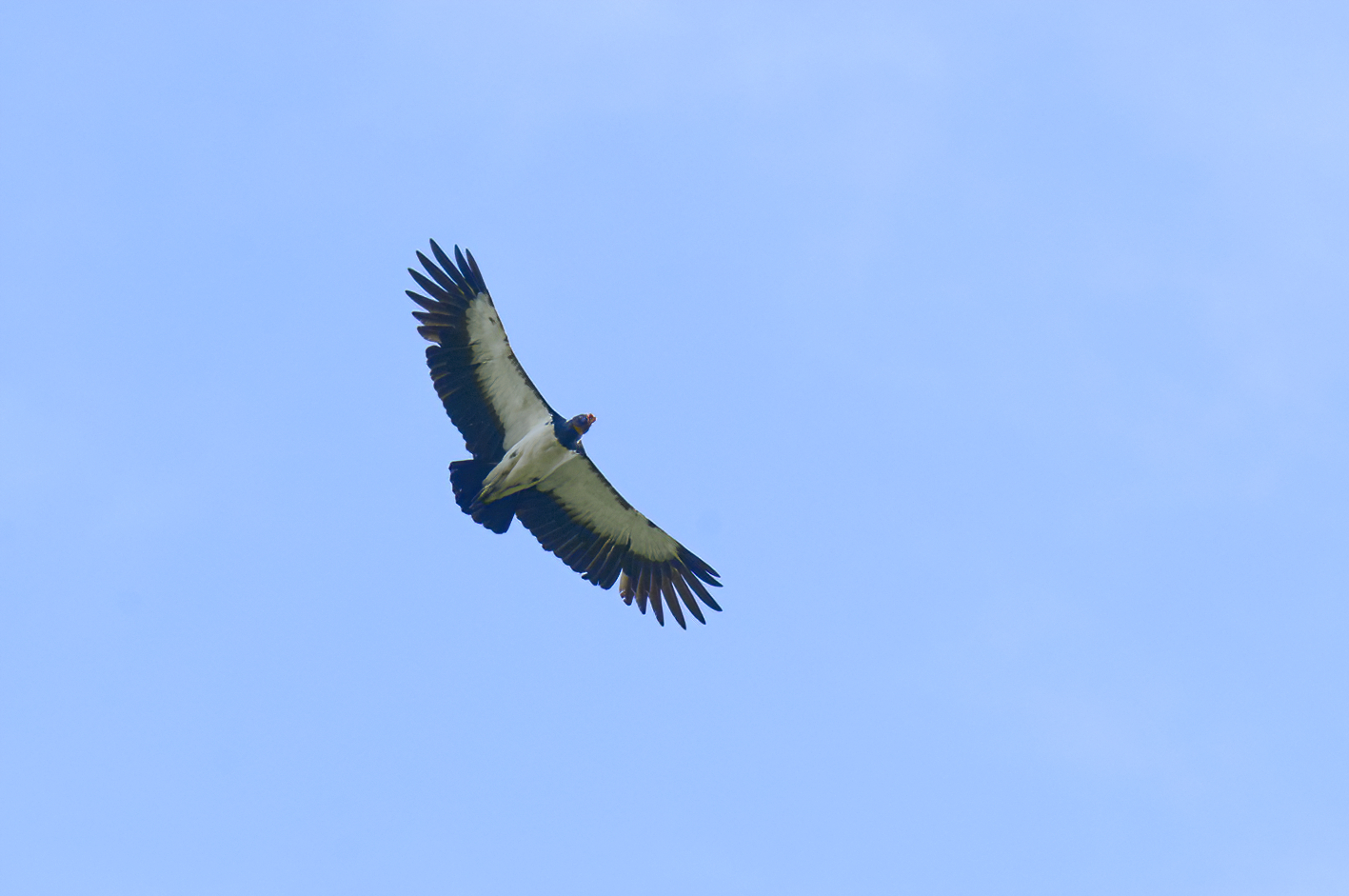
King vulture sighted in the area

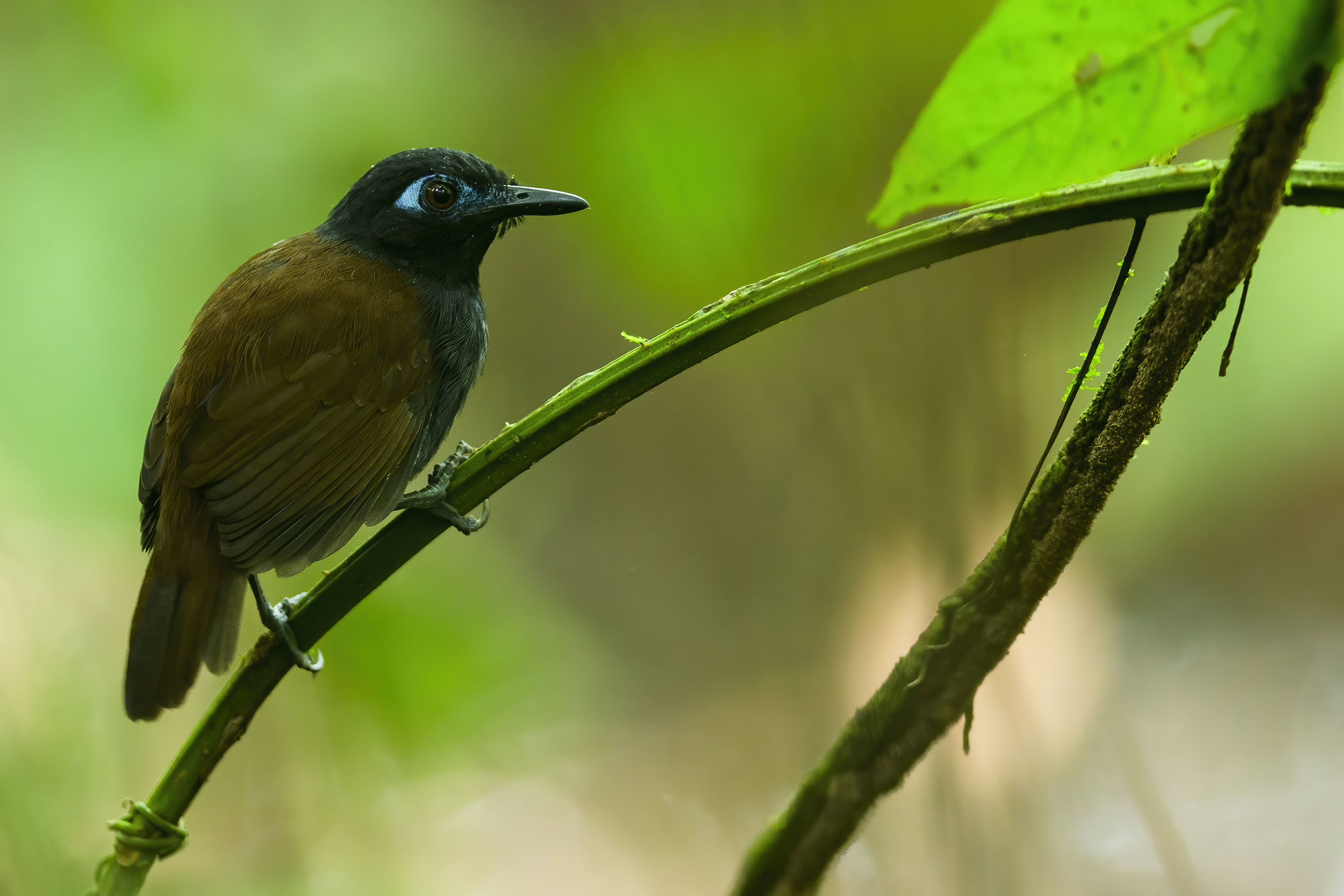
Chestnut-backed antbird

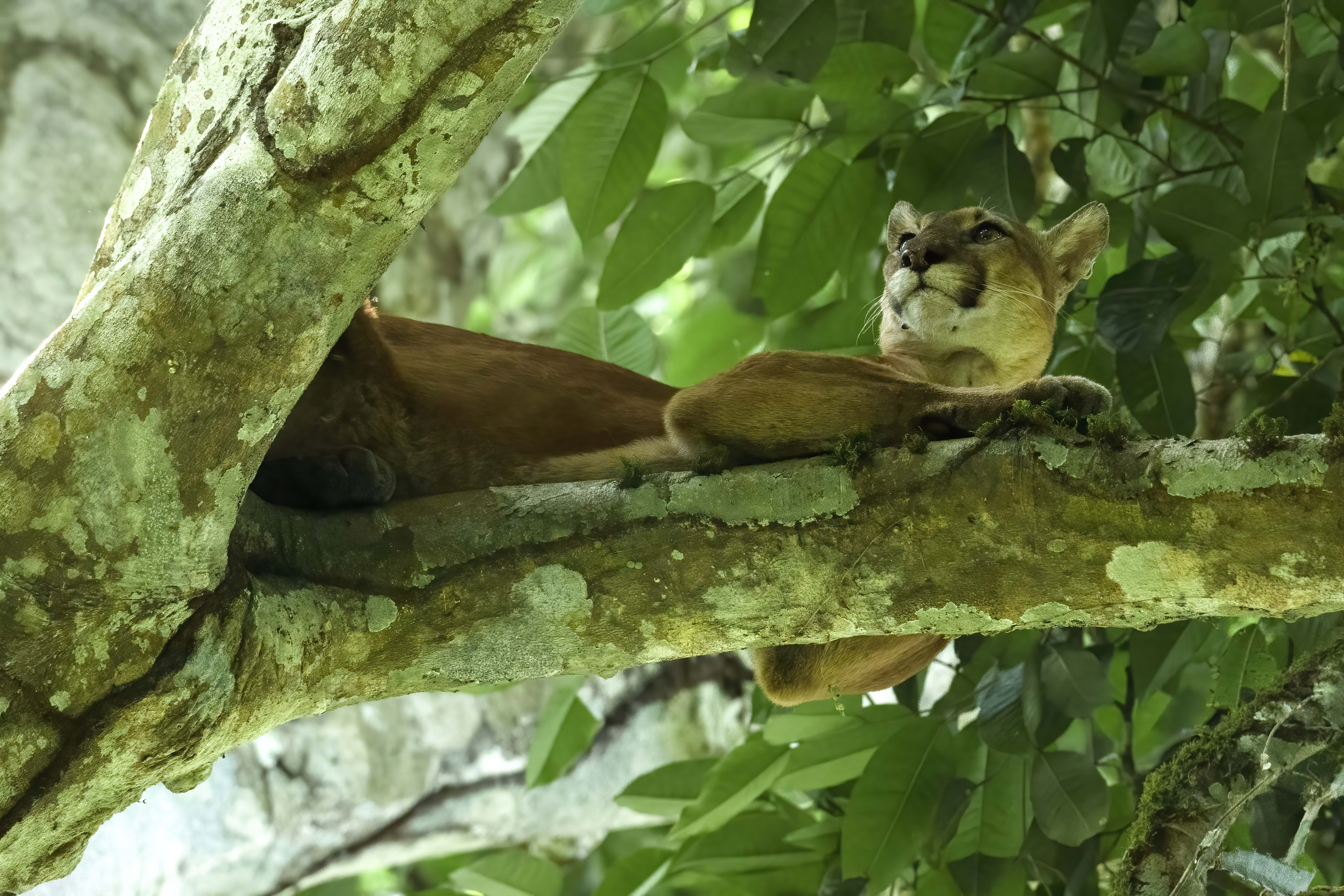
Puma
