= Niceforonia nana =

Conservation status
- Vulnerable (IUCN 3.1)

Scientific classification
- Kingdom: Animalia
- Phylum: Chordata
- Class: Amphibia
- Order: Anura
- Clade: Brachycephaloidea
- Family: Craugastoridae
- Genus: Niceforonia
- Species: N. nana

Binomial name
- Niceforonia nana Goin and Cochran, 1963

Synonyms
- Phrynopus nanus (Goin and Cochran, 1963)

Species of frog

Niceforonia nana is a species of frog in the family Strabomantidae. It is endemic to the Cordillera Oriental, Colombia, and found at 3,000–3,850 m (9,840–12,630 ft) asl.

This rare frog inhabits páramo grassland and montane forest, as well as secondary forest. It is potentially threatened by habitat loss. It can grow to 21 mm (0.83 in) in snout–vent length.
