= Craugastor opimus =

Conservation status
- Least Concern (IUCN 3.1)

Scientific classification
- Kingdom: Animalia
- Phylum: Chordata
- Class: Amphibia
- Order: Anura
- Clade: Brachycephaloidea
- Family: Craugastoridae
- Genus: Craugastor
- Species: C. opimus

Binomial name
- Craugastor opimus (Savage & Myers, 2002)

Species of amphibian

Craugastor opimus is a species of frogs in the family Craugastoridae.

It is found in Colombia and Panama. Its natural habitats are subtropical or tropical moist lowland forests and subtropical or tropical moist montane forests.
