= Niceforonia latens =

Conservation status
- Vulnerable (IUCN 3.1)

Scientific classification
- Kingdom: Animalia
- Phylum: Chordata
- Class: Amphibia
- Order: Anura
- Clade: Brachycephaloidea
- Family: Craugastoridae
- Genus: Niceforonia
- Species: N. latens

Binomial name
- Niceforonia latens (Lynch, 1989)

Synonyms
- Eleutherodactylus latens Lynch, 1989; Hypodactylus latens (Lynch, 1989)

Species of amphibian

Niceforonia latens is a species of frog in the family Strabomantidae. It is endemic to the Cordillera Central of Colombia, and is known from the Antioquia, Caldas, Quindío, and Tolima Departments. Its natural habitats are sub-páramos and páramos at elevations of 2,690–3,350 m (8,830–10,990 ft) above sea level. It occurs on fallen leaves and grass roots. It is a rare species, although its cryptic habits might contribute to this impression. It is threatened by habitat loss (deforestation).
