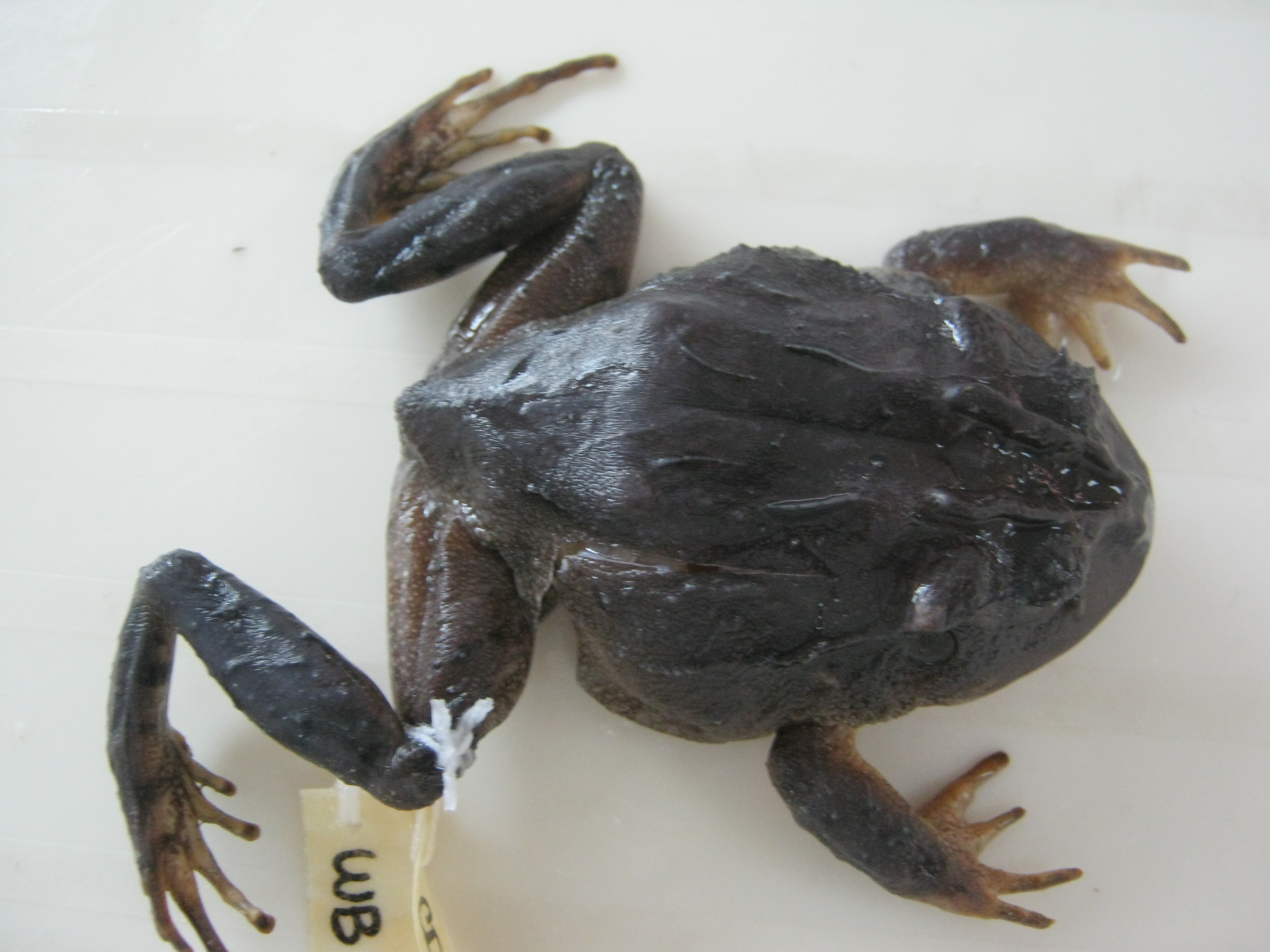

Conservation status
- Endangered (IUCN 3.1)

Scientific classification
- Kingdom: Animalia
- Phylum: Chordata
- Class: Amphibia
- Order: Anura
- Clade: Brachycephaloidea
- Family: Craugastoridae
- Genus: Strabomantis
- Species: S. ruizi

Binomial name
- Strabomantis ruizi (Lynch, 1981)

Synonyms
- Eleutherodactylus ruizi Lynch, 1981

= Strabomantis ruizi =

Ruiz's robber frog

Species of amphibian

Strabomantis ruizi, also known as Ruiz's robber frog, is a species of frog in the family Strabomantidae. It is endemic to Colombia. Its natural habitat is subtropical or tropical moist montane forest. It is threatened by habitat loss.
