= Strabomantis zygodactylus =

Danubio robber frog

Conservation status
- Least Concern (IUCN 3.1)

Scientific classification
- Kingdom: Animalia
- Phylum: Chordata
- Class: Amphibia
- Order: Anura
- Clade: Brachycephaloidea
- Family: Craugastoridae
- Genus: Strabomantis
- Species: S. zygodactylus

Binomial name
- Strabomantis zygodactylus (Lynch & Myers, 1983)

Synonyms
- Craugastor zygodactylus (Lynch & Myers, 1983)

Species of amphibian

Strabomantis zygodactylus, also known as the Danubio robber frog, is a species of frog in the family Strabomantidae. It is endemic to Colombia. Its natural habitats are subtropical or tropical moist lowland forest and rivers. It is threatened by habitat loss.
