= Broad-banded frog =

Broad-banded frog may refer to:

- Broad-banded grass frog (Ptychadena mossambica), a frog in the family Ptychadenidae found in Africa
- Broad-banded grassland frog (Ptychadena bibroni), a frog in the family Ptychadenidae found in Africa
