= Niceforonia babax =

Conservation status
- Least Concern (IUCN 3.1)

Scientific classification
- Kingdom: Animalia
- Phylum: Chordata
- Class: Amphibia
- Order: Anura
- Clade: Brachycephaloidea
- Family: Craugastoridae
- Genus: Niceforonia
- Species: N. babax

Binomial name
- Niceforonia babax (Lynch, 1989)

Synonyms
- Eleutherodactylus babax Lynch, 1989; Hypodactylus babax (Lynch, 1989)

Species of amphibian

Niceforonia babax is a species of frog in the family Strabomantidae found in Colombia and Ecuador. Its natural habitats are subtropical or tropical moist montane forests and heavily degraded former forests. It is threatened by habitat loss.
