= Niceforonia mantipus =

Conservation status
- Least Concern (IUCN 3.1)

Scientific classification
- Kingdom: Animalia
- Phylum: Chordata
- Class: Amphibia
- Order: Anura
- Family: Strabomantidae
- Genus: Niceforonia
- Species: N. mantipus

Binomial name
- Niceforonia mantipus (Boulenger, 1908)

Synonyms
- Leptodactylus mantipus Boulenger, 1908; Eleutherodactylus mantipus (Boulenger, 1908); Hypodactylus mantipus (Boulenger, 1908)

Species of amphibian

Niceforonia mantipus, the mantipus robber frog, is a species of frog in the family Strabomantidae. It is endemic to Colombia and found on the Cordillera Occidental and Cordillera Central, 800–2,400 m (2,600–7,900 ft) asl. Its natural habitats are cloud forests and secondary forests. It lives in leaf-litter and on ground. It is threatened by habitat loss.
