= Strabomantis cerastes =

Palma Real robber frog

Conservation status
- Least Concern (IUCN 3.1)

Scientific classification
- Kingdom: Animalia
- Phylum: Chordata
- Class: Amphibia
- Order: Anura
- Clade: Brachycephaloidea
- Family: Craugastoridae
- Genus: Strabomantis
- Species: S. cerastes

Binomial name
- Strabomantis cerastes (Lynch, 1975)

Synonyms
- Eleutherodactylus cerastes Lynch, 1975; Eleutherodactylus sernai Rivero, 1984

Species of amphibian

Strabomantis cerastes, common name: Palma Real robber frog, is a species of frog in the family Strabomantidae. It is found in Colombia and Ecuador. Its natural habitats are subtropical or tropical moist montane forest and heavily degraded former forest. It is threatened by habitat loss.
