= Strabomantis bufoniformis =

Conservation status
- Endangered (IUCN 3.1)

Scientific classification
- Kingdom: Animalia
- Phylum: Chordata
- Class: Amphibia
- Order: Anura
- Family: Craugastoridae
- Genus: Strabomantis
- Species: S. bufoniformis

Binomial name
- Strabomantis bufoniformis (Boulenger, 1896)

Synonyms
- Hylodes bufoniformis Boulenger, 1896; Craugastor bufoniformis (Boulenger, 1896); Eleutherodactylus bufoniformis (Boulenger, 1896)

Species of frog

Strabomantis bufoniformis is a species of frog in the family Strabomantidae. It is found in western Colombia (including Gorgona Island), Panama, and south-eastern Costa Rica. It is sometimes known as the rusty robber frog.

== Description ==
Strabomantis bufoniformis are relatively large frogs; the maximum snout–vent length attained by males is about 50 mm (2.0 in) and that of females about 94 mm (3.7 in).

== Habitat and conservation ==
Its natural habitats are riparian habitats in primary lowland moist and wet forests; it has only been found in mature forests. It is a nocturnal species.

Strabomantis bufoniformis is uncommon throughout its range, with the exception of Gorgona Island where it is quite common. It may have disappeared from Costa Rica where it has not been seen since 1978. It is classified as "endangered".
