= Niceforonia dolops =

Conservation status
- Vulnerable (IUCN 3.1)

Scientific classification
- Kingdom: Animalia
- Phylum: Chordata
- Class: Amphibia
- Order: Anura
- Family: Strabomantidae
- Genus: Niceforonia
- Species: N. dolops

Binomial name
- Niceforonia dolops (Lynch and Duellman, 1980)

Synonyms
- Eleutherodactylus dolops Lynch and Duellman, 1980; Hypodactylus dolops (Lynch and Duellman, 1980)

Species of amphibian

Niceforonia dolops is a species of frog in the family Strabomantidae. It is found in the Andes of southern Colombia and northern Ecuador. Specifically, it is known from the Cordillera Oriental and Colombian Massif in Caquetá and Putumayo Departments, Colombia, and Napo Province, Ecuador. Common name Putumayo robber frog has been coined for it.

== Description ==
Adult males measure 36–40 mm (1.4–1.6 in) and adult females 57–58 mm (2.2–2.3 in) in snout–vent length. The head is as broad as the body and wider than it is long. The snout is short and subacuminate in dorsal view and rounded in lateral profile. The tympanum is prominent and rounded in males but vertically elongated in females. Skin of the dorsum is pustulate and has short ridges along upper flanks; the flanks are areolate. The fingers have no lateral fringes but are feebly keeled laterally. The fingers bear weakly dilated pads with discs. The toes have no lateral fringes but are weakly keeled and bear pads with discs. No webbing is present. The dorsal coloration is dull tan to brown with darker brown to black markings. The posterior surfaces of thighs are orange brown, reddish brown, or dark brown and have cream or pale yellow flecks. The ventrum is creamy yellow to pinkish tan and has brown mottling, or dark brown to black with bluish white flecks. The iris is dull brown with grayish or reddish tint.

== Habitat and conservation ==
Niceforonia dolops lives in stream habitats in cloud forest at elevations of 940–1,950 m (3,080–6,400 ft) above sea level. Individuals have been found on ground or perched on small shrubs at night, and under rocks or in rock crevices during the day. The site of egg deposition is unknown.

Niceforonia dolops is an uncommon species. It is threatened by habitat loss caused by agriculture and logging. It occurs in the Alto Fragua Indi-Wasi National Natural Park (Colombia) and Cayambe Coca Ecological Reserve (Ecuador).
