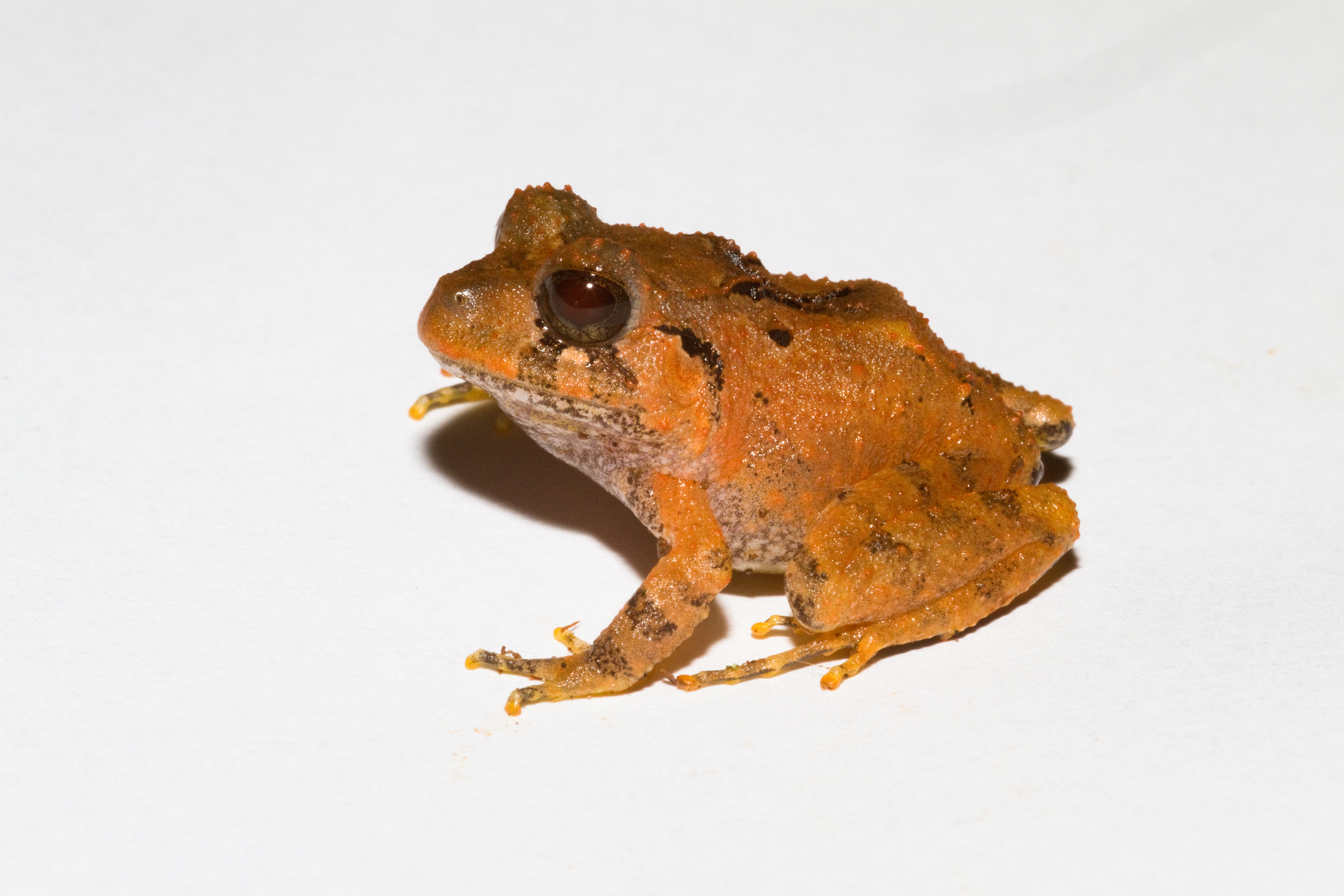

Conservation status
- Least Concern (IUCN 3.1)

Scientific classification
- Kingdom: Animalia
- Phylum: Chordata
- Class: Amphibia
- Order: Anura
- Family: Craugastoridae
- Genus: Craugastor
- Species: C. megacephalus

Binomial name
- Craugastor megacephalus (Cope, 1875)

= Craugastor megacephalus =

Species of frog

Craugastor megacephalus is a species of frog in the family Craugastoridae. It is found in Costa Rica, Honduras, Nicaragua, and Panama. Its natural habitats are subtropical or tropical moist lowland forests, subtropical or tropical moist montane forests, and heavily degraded former forest. It is threatened by habitat loss.
