= Strabomantis anatipes =

Conservation status
- Vulnerable (IUCN 3.1)

Scientific classification
- Kingdom: Animalia
- Phylum: Chordata
- Class: Amphibia
- Order: Anura
- Clade: Brachycephaloidea
- Family: Craugastoridae
- Genus: Strabomantis
- Species: S. anatipes

Binomial name
- Strabomantis anatipes (Lynch and Myers, 1983)

Synonyms
- Eleutherodactylus anatipes Lynch and Myers, 1983; Craugastor anatipes (Lynch and Myers, 1983)

Species of amphibian

Strabomantis anatipes (vernacular name: anatipes robber frog) is a species of frog in the family Strabomantidae. It is found in the Mira River drainage in extreme northern Ecuador and in adjacent southern Colombia (Nariño, Cauca, and Valle del Cauca Departments) in foothills and lower cloud forest on the Pacific lowlands and slopes of the Cordillera Occidental. It altitudinal range is 100–1,600 m (330–5,250 ft) asl.

The specific name refers to the extensive foot webbing of the species: it is a compound of the Latin anatis (of a duck) and pes (foot).

== Description ==
Strabomantis anatipes is a large species of frog: males measure more than 33 mm (1.3 in) and females >73 mm (2.9 in) in snout–vent length. In males, skin of dorsum bears numerous pimple like spinules and a pair of sinuous postorbital ridges, but is smooth with low tubercles, short ridges, and postorbital ridges in females. They are greenish brown with orangish warts and ridges. Groin, anterior and posterior surfaces of thighs are dull yellow with black reticulation. Throat is white with brown vermiculations. Venter and undersides of limbs are yellow. Iris is bright copper with black flecks and a brown horizontal streak.

== Habitat and conservation ==
The species' natural habitats are forests, from tropical moist lowland forest to lower cloud forest. It is closely associated with small streams. It is nocturnal, sitting on rocks, very steep cliffs, or in rocky crevices alongside streams.

Strabomantis anatipes is a very uncommon species. It is believed to be declining in abundance. Habitat loss caused by agricultural development, logging, and human settlement is probably the main threat to it. Also pollution from spraying illegal crops is a significant threat.
