= Niceforonia elassodiscus =

Conservation status
- Near Threatened (IUCN 3.1)

Scientific classification
- Kingdom: Animalia
- Phylum: Chordata
- Class: Amphibia
- Order: Anura
- Clade: Brachycephaloidea
- Family: Craugastoridae
- Genus: Niceforonia
- Species: N. elassodiscus

Binomial name
- Niceforonia elassodiscus (Lynch, 1973)

Synonyms
- Eleutherodactylus elassodiscus Lynch, 1973; Hypodactylus elassodiscus (Lynch, 1973)

Species of amphibian

Niceforonia elassodiscus is a species of frog in the family Strabomantidae found in Colombia and Ecuador. Its natural habitat is subtropical or tropical moist montane forests. It is threatened by habitat loss.
