= Strabomantis helonotus =

Rio Pitzara robber frog

Conservation status
- Critically Endangered (IUCN 3.1)

Scientific classification
- Kingdom: Animalia
- Phylum: Chordata
- Class: Amphibia
- Order: Anura
- Clade: Brachycephaloidea
- Family: Craugastoridae
- Genus: Strabomantis
- Species: S. helonotus

Binomial name
- Strabomantis helonotus (Lynch, 1975)

Synonyms
- Eleutherodactylus helonotus (Lynch, 1975)

Species of amphibian

Strabomantis helonotus, common name: Rio Pitzara robber frog, is a species of frog in the family Strabomantidae. It is endemic to Ecuador. It is currently only known to inhabit two regions near Rio Pitzara. Its natural habitats are subtropical or tropical moist lowland forest and subtropical or tropical moist montane forest. It is threatened by habitat destruction.
