= Craugastor gulosus =

Conservation status
- Critically Endangered (IUCN 3.1)

Scientific classification
- Kingdom: Animalia
- Phylum: Chordata
- Class: Amphibia
- Order: Anura
- Family: Craugastoridae
- Genus: Craugastor
- Species: C. gulosus

Binomial name
- Craugastor gulosus (Cope, 1875)

Species of frog

Craugastor gulosus is a species of frog in the family Craugastoridae. It is found in Costa Rica and Panama. Its natural habitat is subtropical or tropical moist montane forests. It is threatened by habitat loss.
