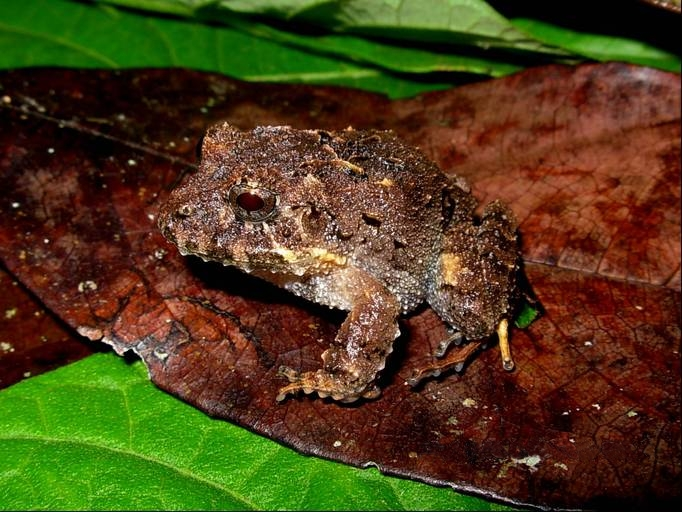

Conservation status
- Least Concern (IUCN 3.1)

Scientific classification
- Kingdom: Animalia
- Phylum: Chordata
- Class: Amphibia
- Order: Anura
- Family: Craugastoridae
- Genus: Strabomantis
- Species: S. biporcatus

Binomial name
- Strabomantis biporcatus Peters, 1863

Synonyms
- Eleutherodactylus biporcatus (Peters, 1863); Hylodes maussi Boettger, 1893; Eleutherodactylus maussi (Peters, 1863); Craugastor biporcatus (Boettger, 1893)

= Strabomantis biporcatus =

Species of amphibian

Strabomantis biporcatus (vernacular name: Puerto Cabello robber frog) is a species of frog in the family Strabomantidae. It is endemic to northern Venezuela and known from the Venezuelan Coastal Range and Serranía del Interior. Its natural habitats are humid lowland and montane cloud forests at elevations of 250–1,600 m (820–5,250 ft) above sea level. It is a terrestrial and nocturnal species. It is threatened by habitat loss and degradation caused by agriculture.
