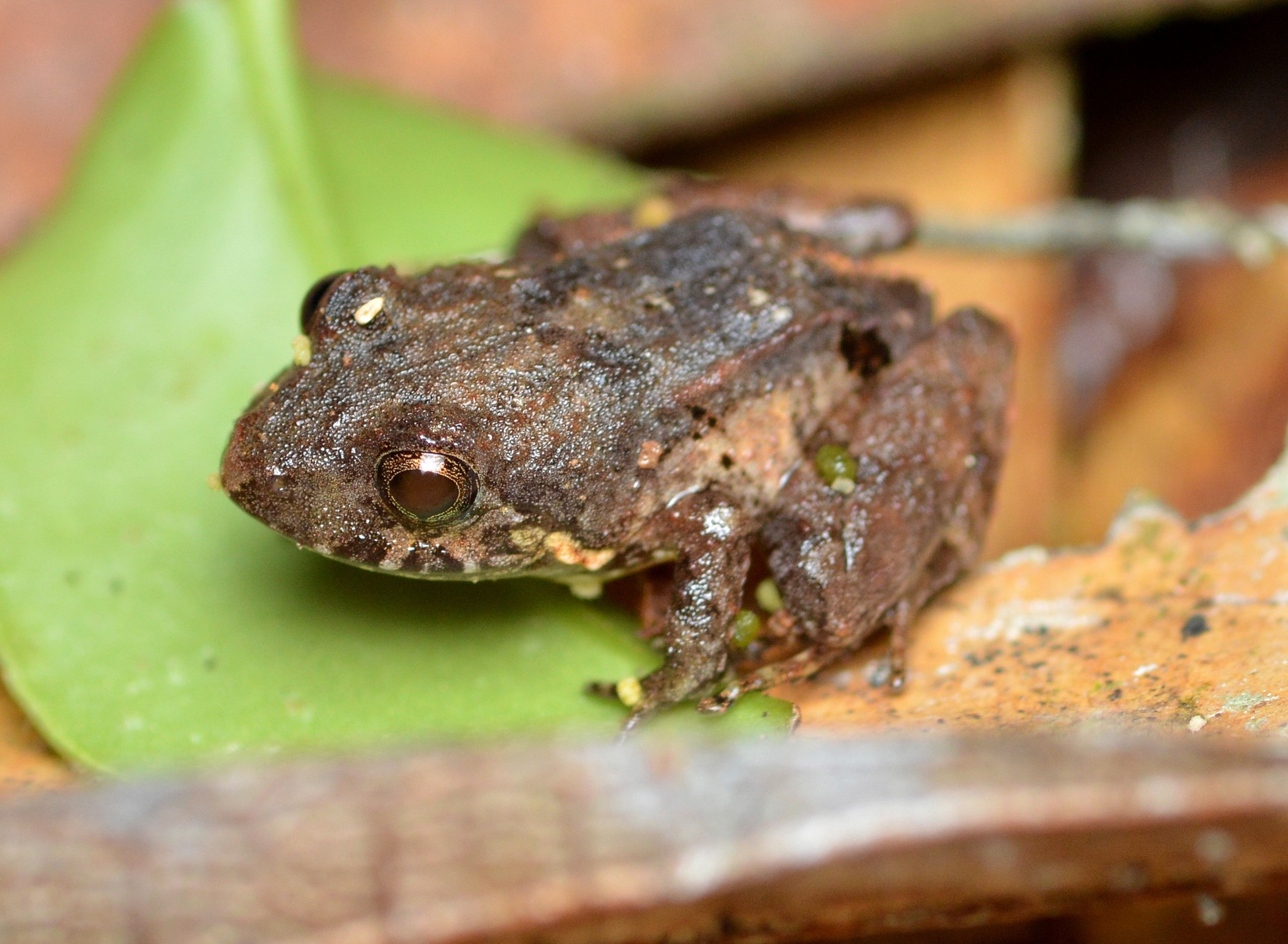

Conservation status
- Least Concern (IUCN 3.1)

Scientific classification
- Kingdom: Animalia
- Phylum: Chordata
- Class: Amphibia
- Order: Anura
- Clade: Brachycephaloidea
- Family: Craugastoridae
- Genus: Niceforonia
- Species: N. nigrovittata

Binomial name
- Niceforonia nigrovittata (Andersson, 1945)

Synonyms
- Eleutherodactylus nigrovittatus Andersson, 1945; Hypodactylus nigrovittatus (Andersson, 1945)

= Niceforonia nigrovittata =

Species of amphibian

Niceforonia nigrovittata is a species of frog in the family Strabomantidae found in Colombia, Ecuador, Peru, and possibly Brazil. Its natural habitats are subtropical or tropical moist lowland forests and heavily degraded former forests.
