= Strabomantis ingeri =

Inger's robber frog

Conservation status
- Vulnerable (IUCN 3.1)

Scientific classification
- Kingdom: Animalia
- Phylum: Chordata
- Class: Amphibia
- Order: Anura
- Clade: Brachycephaloidea
- Family: Craugastoridae
- Genus: Strabomantis
- Species: S. ingeri

Binomial name
- Strabomantis ingeri (Cochran & Goin, 1961)

Synonyms
- Amblyphrynus ingeri Cochran & Goin, 1961; Eleutherodactylus ingeri (Cochran & Goin, 1961)

Species of amphibian

Strabomantis ingeri, also known commonly as Inger's robber frog, is a species of frog in the family Strabomantidae. The species is native to Colombia.

== Geographic range ==
S. ingeri is found on the eastern and western slopes of the Cordillera Oriental, Colombia (Cundinamarca, Santander, and Norte de Santander Departments). Its altitudinal range is 1,550–3,320 m (5,090–10,890 ft) asl. It may also occur in adjacent Venezuela.

== Etymology ==
S. ingeri is named after Robert F. Inger, an American zoologist from the Field Museum of Natural History.

== Habitat ==
The natural habitat of S. ingeri is leaf-litter in cloud forest; it can occur in disturbed areas provided that small patches of forest remain nearby. It is threatened by habitat loss caused by logging and agricultural development.
