= Strabomantis sulcatus =

Nauta robber frog

Conservation status
- Least Concern (IUCN 3.1)

Scientific classification
- Kingdom: Animalia
- Phylum: Chordata
- Class: Amphibia
- Order: Anura
- Family: Craugastoridae
- Genus: Strabomantis
- Species: S. sulcatus

Binomial name
- Strabomantis sulcatus (Cope, 1874)

Synonyms
- Eleutherodactylus sulcatus (Cope, 1874)

Species of amphibian

Strabomantis sulcatus, also known as Nauta robber frog, is a species of frog in the family Strabomantidae. It is found in Brazil, Colombia, Ecuador, and Peru. Its natural habitat is subtropical or tropical moist lowland forest.
