= Chaoborus trivittatus =

Scientific classification
- Domain: Eukaryota
- Kingdom: Animalia
- Phylum: Arthropoda
- Class: Insecta
- Order: Diptera
- Family: Chaoboridae
- Genus: Chaoborus
- Species: C. trivittatus

Binomial name
- Chaoborus trivittatus (Loew, 1862)

Synonyms
- Chaoborus brunskilli Saether, 1970; Corethra trivittata Loew, 1862; Sayomyia knabi Dyar, 1905

Species of fly

Chaoborus trivittatus is a species of phantom midges (flies in the family Chaoboridae).
