= Chaoborus astictopus =

Scientific classification
- Domain: Eukaryota
- Kingdom: Animalia
- Phylum: Arthropoda
- Class: Insecta
- Order: Diptera
- Family: Chaoboridae
- Genus: Chaoborus
- Species: C. astictopus

Binomial name
- Chaoborus astictopus Dyar & Shannon, 1924

Synonyms
- Chaoborus lacustris Freeborn, 1926

Species of fly

Chaoborus astictopus, the Clear Lake gnat, is a species of phantom midges in the family Chaoboridae. The older larvae are commonly found in the profundal zone of lakes during the day and in the open waters at night, suggesting that they are negatively phototactic.

The larvae can be vulnerable to the pathogen Thelohania corethrae during the winter season. They are also susceptible to the fungal pathogen Tolypocladium cylindrosporum.
