= Urine =

Liquid by-product of animal metabolism

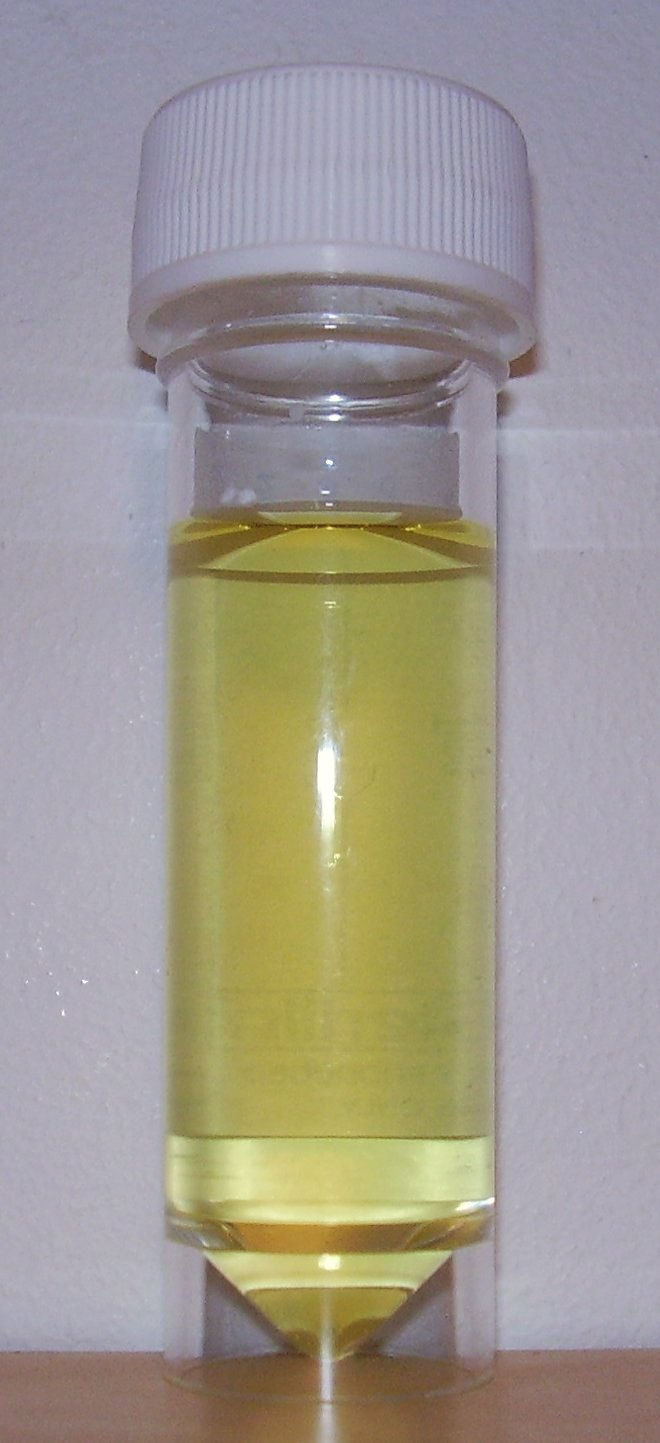
Sample of human urine

Urine is the fluid excreted by the kidneys of vertebrates to clear the bloodstream of excess water and metabolic by-products including urea, uric acid, and creatinine.

In mammals, urine travels from the kidneys via the ureters to the bladder for storage until urination. Placental mammals urinate through the urethra, whereas other vertebrates urinate through the cloaca.

Urine plays an important role in the earth's nitrogen cycle. In balanced ecosystems, urine fertilizes the soil and thus helps plants to grow. Therefore, urine can be used as a fertilizer. Some animals mark their territories with urine. Historically, aged or fermented urine (known as lant) was also used in gunpowder production, household cleaning, leather tanning, and textile dyeing.

Human urine and feces, called human waste or human excreta, are managed via sanitation systems. Livestock urine and feces also require proper management if the livestock population density is high.

== Physiology ==
The chemical structure of urea

Most animals have excretory systems for elimination of soluble toxic wastes. In humans, soluble wastes are excreted primarily by the urinary system and, to a lesser extent in terms of urea, removed by perspiration. In placental mammals, the urinary system consists of the kidneys, ureters, urinary bladder, and urethra. The system produces urine by a process of filtration, reabsorption, and tubular secretion. The kidneys extract the soluble wastes from the bloodstream, as well as excess water, sugars, and a variety of other compounds. The resulting urine contains high concentrations of urea and other substances, including toxins. Urine flows from the kidneys through the ureter, bladder, and finally the urethra before passing through the urinary meatus.

=== Duration ===
Research looking at the duration of urination in a range of mammal species found that nine larger species urinated for 21 ± 13 seconds irrespective of body size. Smaller species, including rodents and bats, cannot produce steady streams of urine and instead urinate with a series of drops.

== Characteristics ==
=== Quantity ===
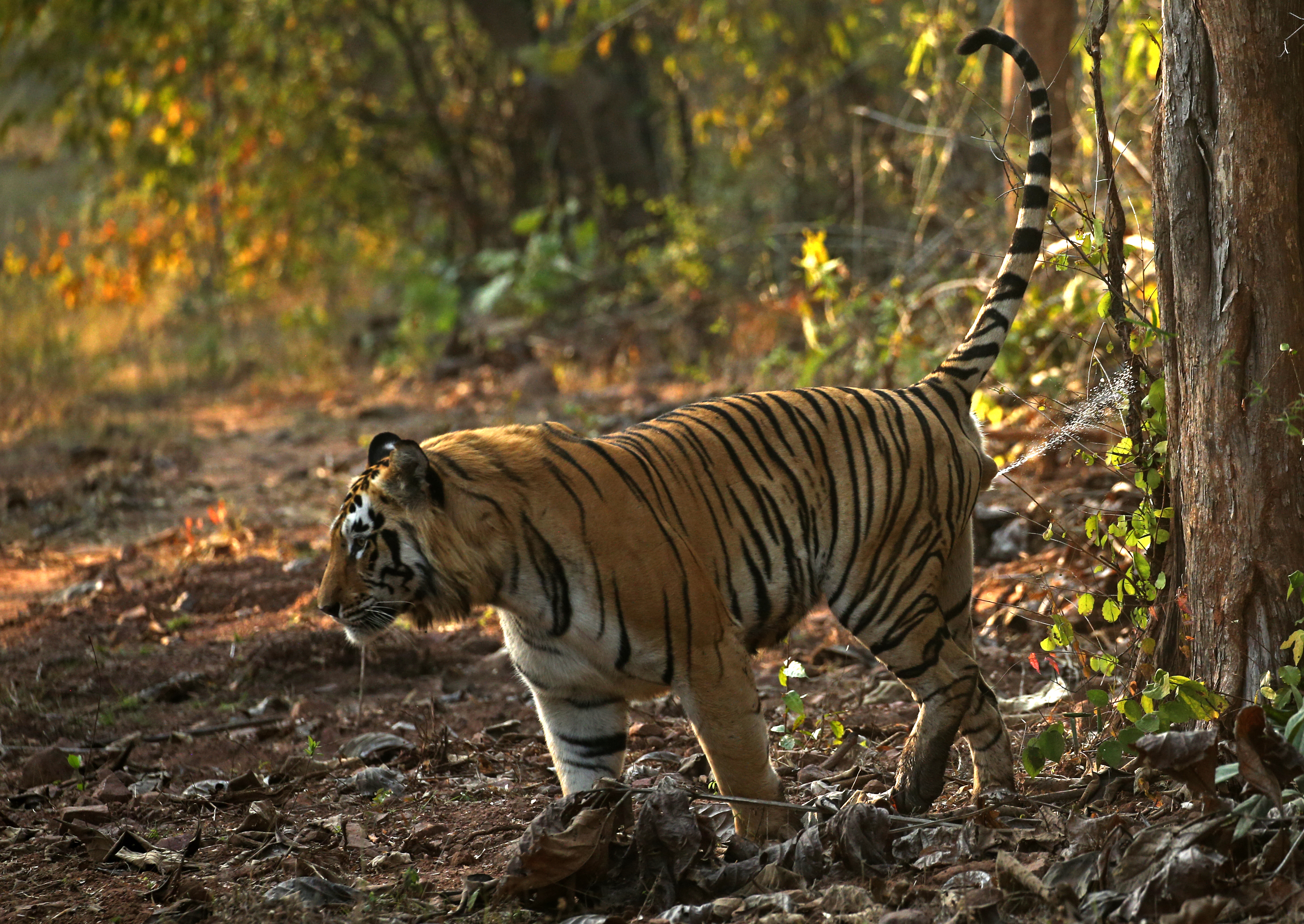
Tigers spray small quantities of urine to mark their territories.

The adult human bladder typically holds between 300 and 500 ml (10 and 17 fl oz) of urine before urination, but it can hold considerably more. Average urine production in adult humans is around 1.4 L (0.31 imp gal; 0.37 US gal) of urine per person per day with a normal range of 0.6 to 2.6 L (0.13 to 0.57 imp gal; 0.16 to 0.69 US gal) per person per day, produced in around 6 to 8 urinations per day depending on state of hydration, activity level, environmental factors, weight, and the individual's health. Producing too much or too little urine needs medical attention. Polyuria is a condition of excessive production of urine (> 2.5 L/day), oliguria when < 400 mL are produced, and anuria being < 100 mL per day.

=== Constituents ===
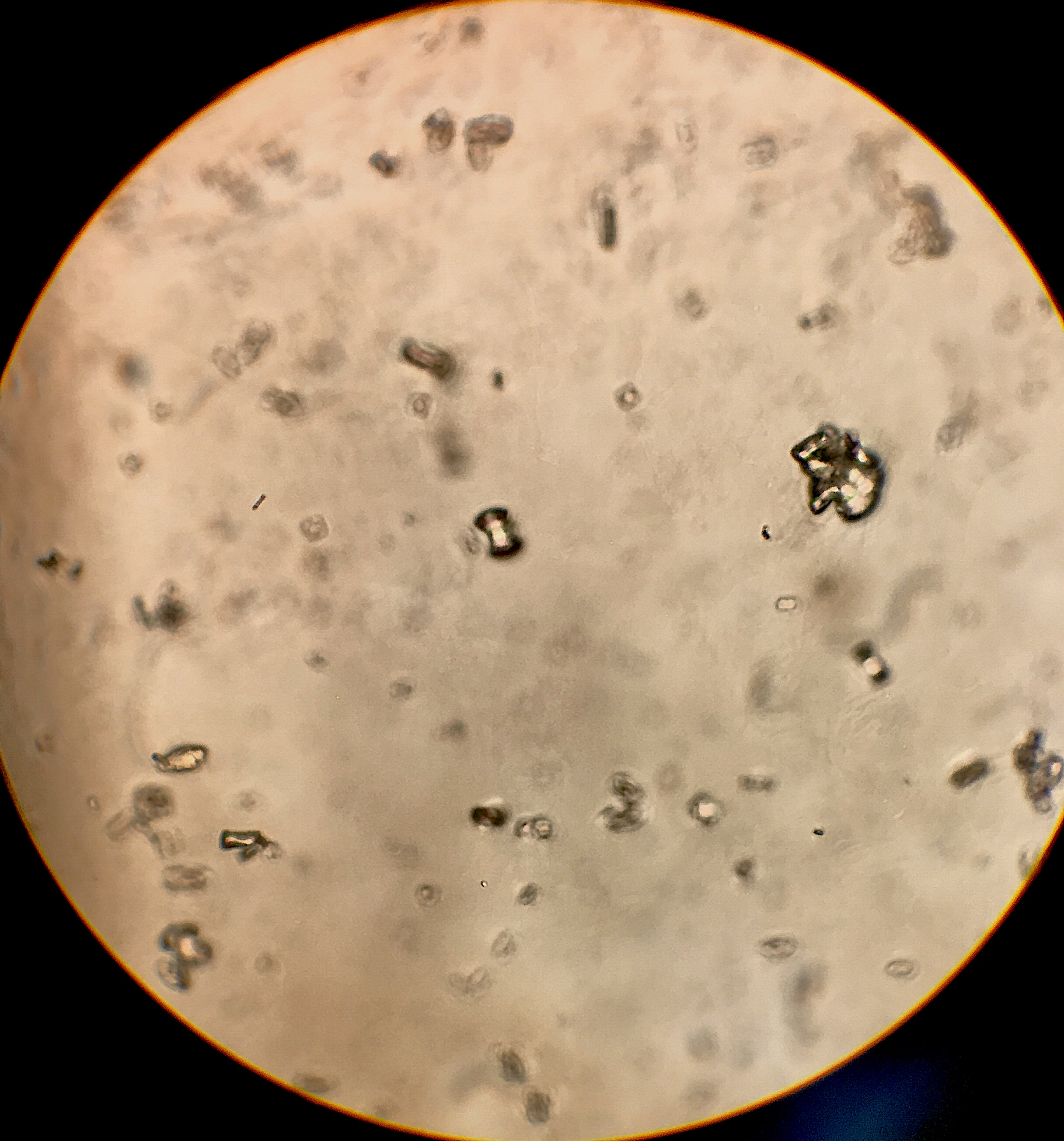
Urine containing uric acid crystals under the microscope

About 91–96% of urine consists of water. The remainder can be broadly characterized into inorganic salts, urea, organic compounds, and organic ammonium salts. Urine also contains proteins, hormones, and a wide range of metabolites, varying by what is introduced into the body.

The total solids in urine are on average 59 g (2.1 oz) per day per person. Urea is the largest constituent of the solids, constituting more than 50% of the total. The daily volume and composition of urine varies per person based on the amount of physical exertion, environmental conditions, as well as water, salt, and protein intakes. In healthy persons, urine contains very little protein and an excess is suggestive of illness, as with sugar. Organic matter, in healthy persons, also is reported to be at most 1.7 times more matter than minerals. However, any more than that is suggestive of illness.

Typical design values for the concentrations of constituents in fresh urine, based on data in Sweden and Switzerland
Parameter	Value
pH	6.2
Total nitrogen	8,830 mg/L
Ammonium/ammonia-N	460 mg/L
Nitrate and nitrite	0.06 mg/L
Chemical oxygen demand	6,000 mg/L
Total phosphorus	800–2,000 mg/L
Potassium	2,740 mg/L
Sulphate	1,500 mg/L
Sodium	3,450 mg/L
Magnesium	120 mg/L
Chloride	4,970 mg/L
Calcium	230 mg/L

Lesser amounts and concentrations of other compounds and ions are often present in urination of humans.

=== Color ===
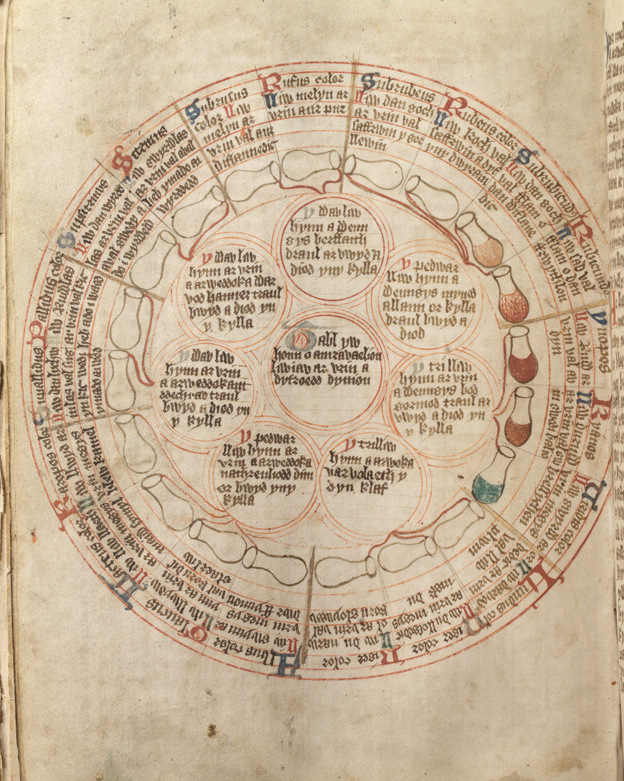
Medical experts have long connected urine color with certain medical conditions — medieval chart (above) showing the medical implications of different urine colors

Urine varies in appearance, depending principally upon a body's level of hydration, interactions with drugs, compounds and pigments or dyes found in food, or diseases. Normally, urine is a transparent solution ranging from colorless to amber, but is usually a pale yellow. Usually urination color comes primarily from the presence of urobilin. Urobilin is a final waste product resulting from the breakdown of heme from hemoglobin during the destruction of aging blood cells.

Colorless urine indicates over-hydration. Colorless urine in drug tests can suggest an attempt to avoid detection of illicit drugs in the bloodstream through over-hydration.

- Bloody urine is termed hematuria, a symptom of a wide variety of medical conditions.
- Reddish or brown urine may be caused by porphyria (not to be confused with the harmless, temporary pink or reddish tint caused by beeturia).
- Pinkish urine can result from the consumption of beets (beeturia)
- Dark yellow urine is often indicative of dehydration.
- Orange urine due to certain medications such as rifampin and phenazopyridine
- Dark orange to brown urine can be a symptom of jaundice, rhabdomyolysis, or Gilbert's syndrome.
- Greenish urine can result from the consumption of asparagus or foods, beverages with green pigments, or from a urinary tract infection.
- Blue urine can be caused by the ingestion of methylene blue (e.g., in medications) or foods or beverages with blue dyes.
- Blue urine stains can be caused by blue diaper syndrome.
- Purple urine may be due to purple urine bag syndrome.
- Black or dark-colored urine is referred to as melanuria and may be caused by a melanoma or non-melanin acute intermittent porphyria.
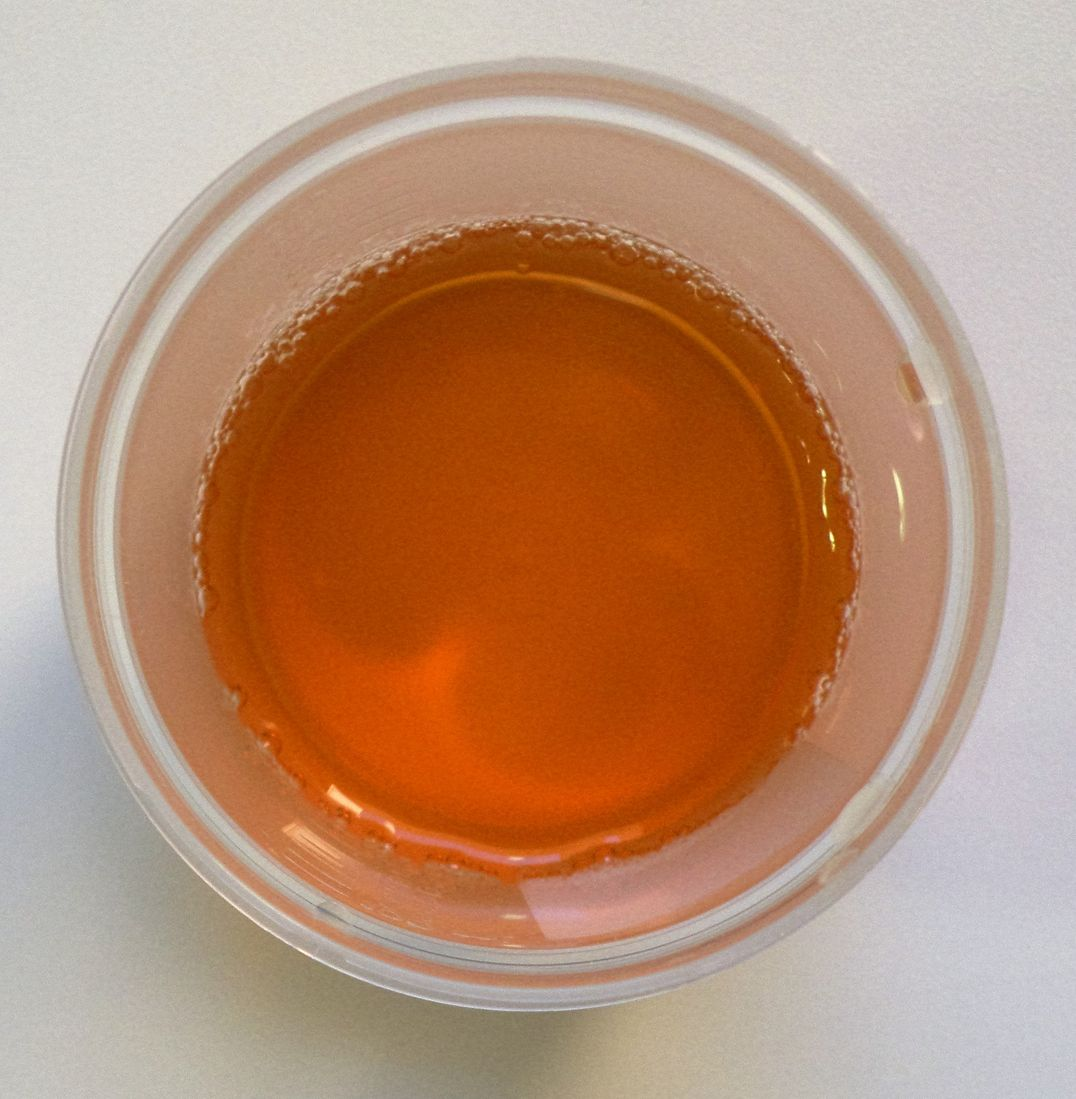
Dark urine due to low fluid intake.

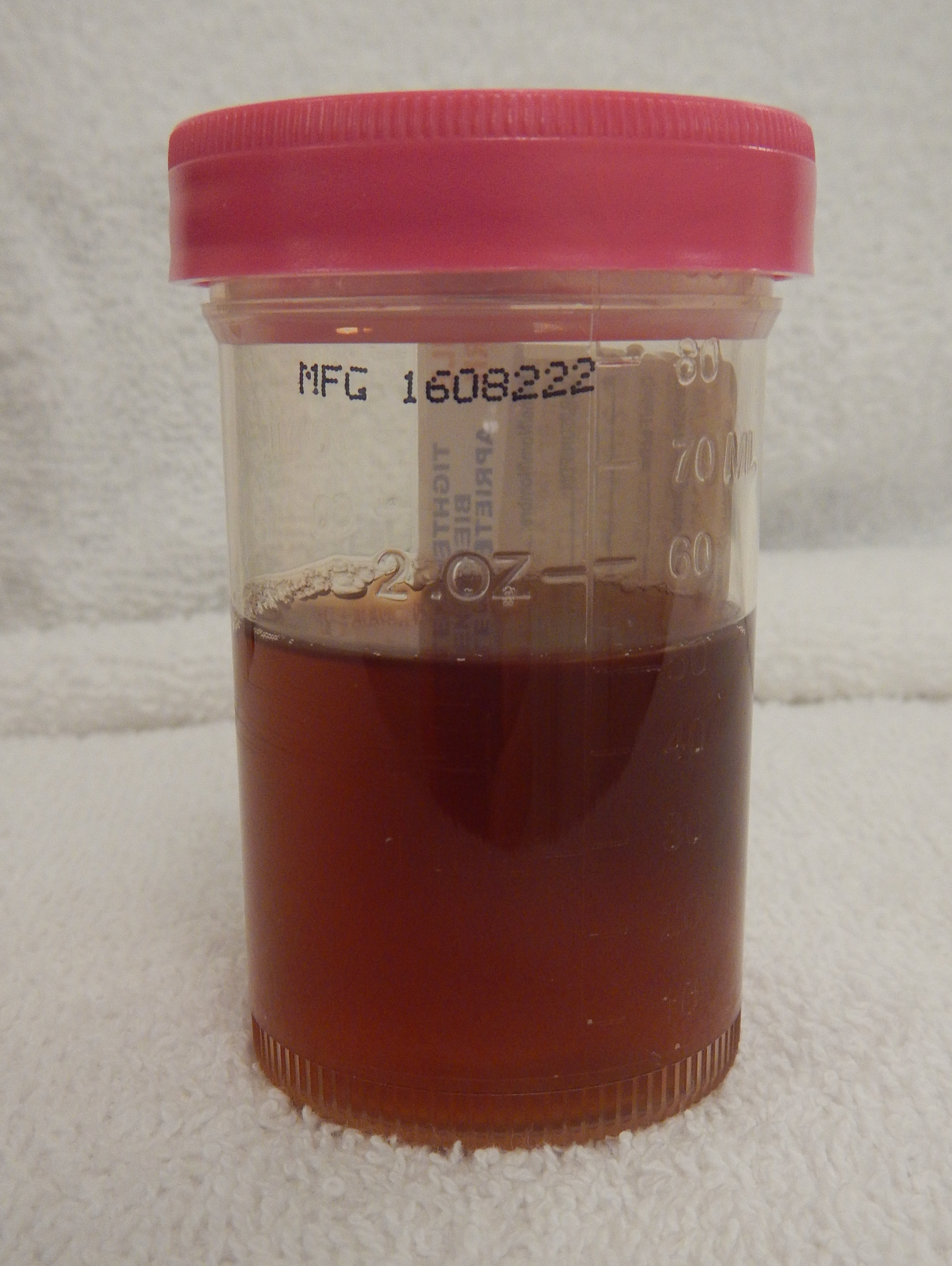
Dark red urine due to blood (hematuria).

Dark red urine due to choluria.

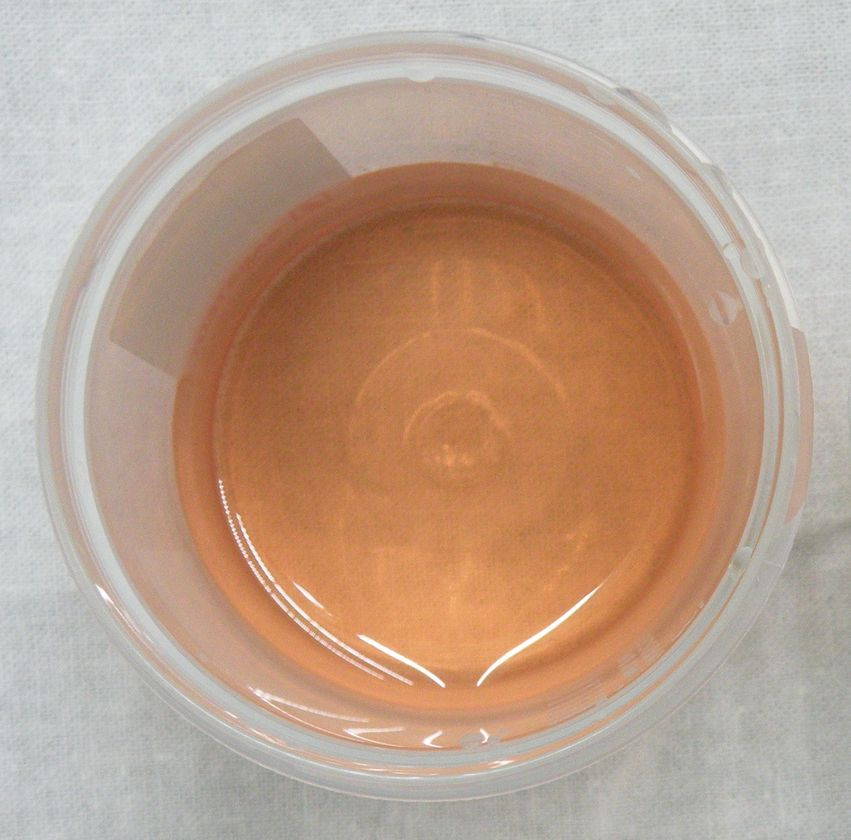
Pinkish urine due to consumption of beetroots.

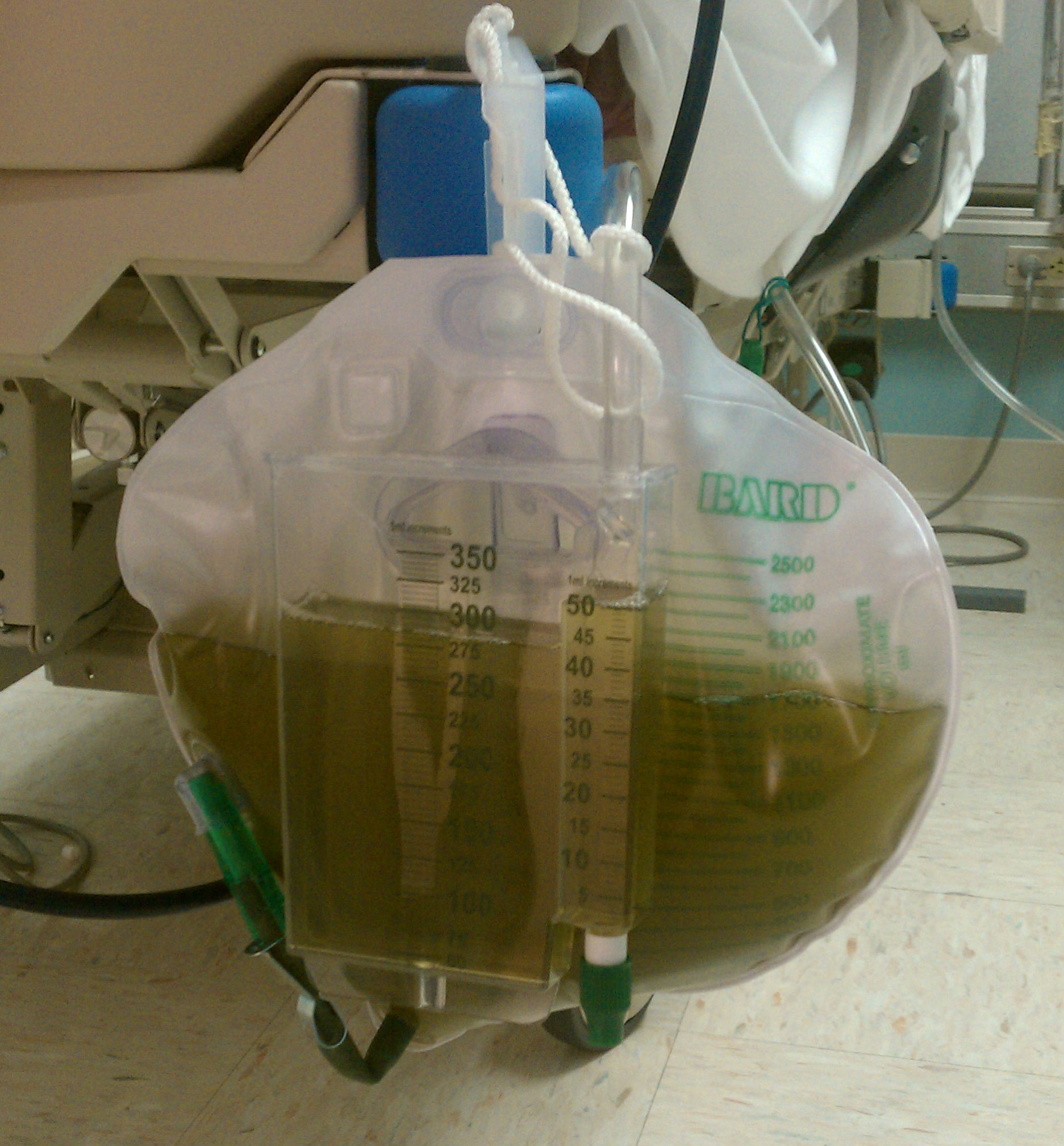
Green urine during long term infusion of the sedative propofol.

=== Odor ===
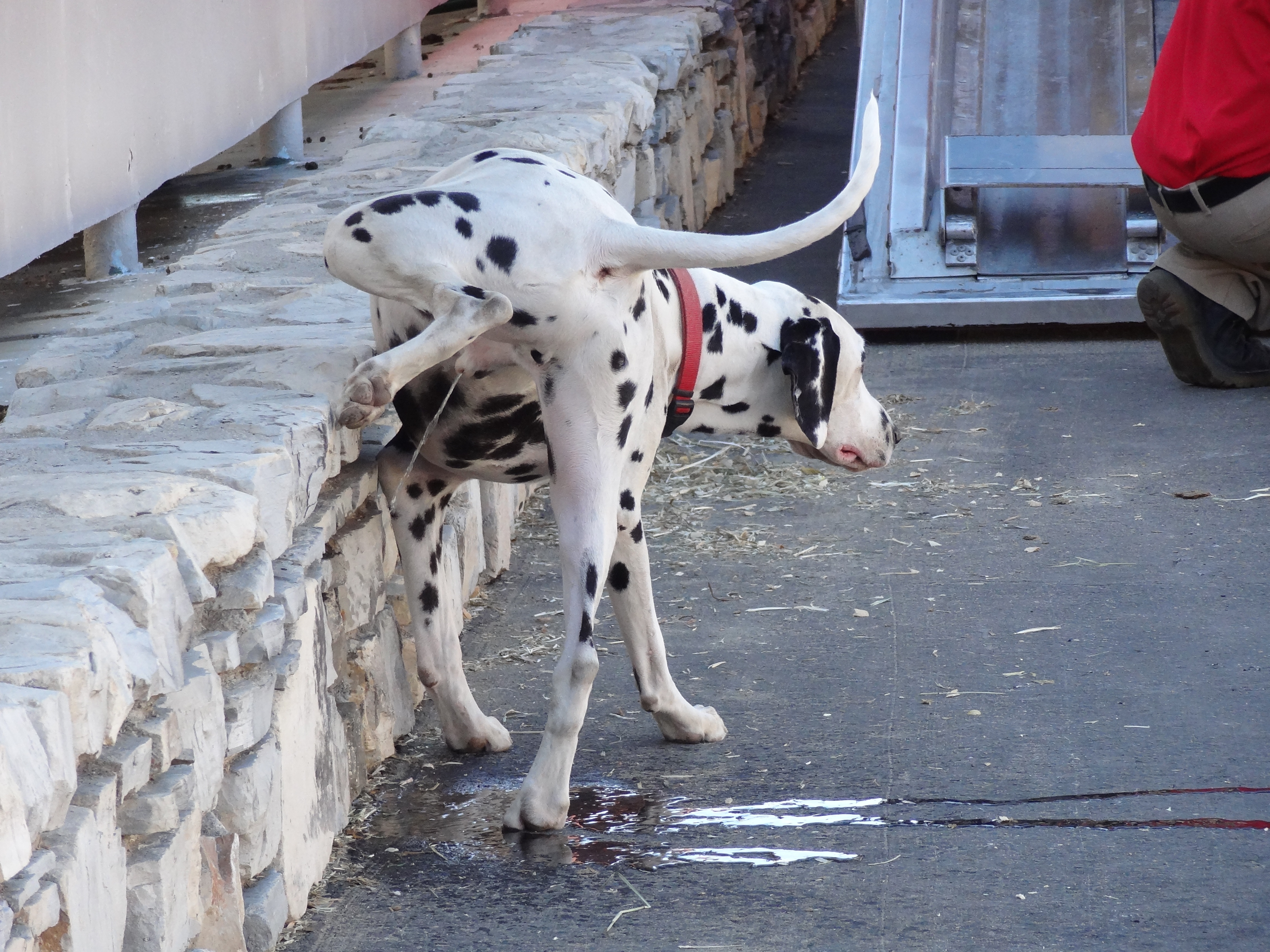
Dogs communicate using olfactory signals in urine.

Sometime after leaving the body, urine may acquire a strong ammonia-like odor due to bacterial decomposition of urea into ammonia. Fresh urine from healthy individuals typically has only a mild odor. Abnormally strong or unpleasant urine odor may occur in association with dehydration, diet, or urinary tract infections.

The odor of normal human urine can reflect what has been consumed or specific diseases. For example, an individual with diabetes mellitus may present a sweetened urine odor. This can be due to kidney diseases as well, such as kidney stones. Additionally, the presence of amino acids in urine (diagnosed as maple syrup urine disease) can cause it to smell of maple syrup.

Eating asparagus can cause a strong odor reminiscent of the vegetable caused by the body's breakdown of asparagusic acid. Likewise, consumption of saffron, alcohol, coffee, tuna fish, and onion can result in telltale scents. Particularly spicy foods can have a similar effect, as their compounds pass through the kidneys without being fully broken down before exiting the body.

=== pH ===
The pH normally is within the range of 5.5 to 7 with an average of 6.2. In persons with hyperuricosuria, acidic urine can contribute to the formation of stones of uric acid in the kidneys, ureters, or bladder. Urine pH can be monitored by a physician or at home.

A diet which is high in protein from meat and dairy, as well as alcohol consumption can reduce urine pH, whilst potassium and organic acids, such as from diets high in fruit and vegetables, can increase the pH and make it more alkaline.

Cranberries, popularly thought to decrease the pH of urine, have actually been shown not to acidify urine. Drugs that can decrease urine pH include ammonium chloride, chlorothiazide diuretics, and methenamine mandelate.

=== Density ===
Human urine has a specific gravity of 1.003–1.035.

=== Bacteria and pathogens ===
Urine is not sterile, not even in the bladder, contrary to longstanding popular belief. This opened a new area of study: the urinary microbiome. In the urethra, epithelial cells lining the urethra are colonized by facultatively anaerobic Gram-negative rod and cocci bacteria. One study conducted in Nigeria isolated a total of 77 distinct bacterial strains from 100 healthy children (ages 5–11) as well as 39 strains from 33 cow urine samples, a considerable amount being pathogens. Pathogens identified and their percentages were:

Bacterial isolates in human urine and cows'
Humans aged 5–11	Bacterial percentage in humans	Bacterial percentage in cows
Bacillus	10.4%	5.1%
Staphylococcus	2.6%	2.6%
Citrobacter	3.9%	12.8%
Klebsiella	7.8%	12.8%
Escherichia coli	36.4%	23.1%
Proteus	18.2%	23.1%
Pseudomonas	9.1%	2.6%
Salmonella	3.9%	5.1%
Shigella	7.8%	12.8%

The study also states:

Multiple antibiotic resistance (MAR) rates recorded in children urinal bacterial species were 37.5–100% (Gram-positive) and 12.5–100% (Gram-negative), while MAR among the cow urinal bacteria was 12.5–75.0% (Gram-positive) and 25.0–100% (Gram-negative).

== Examination for medical purposes ==
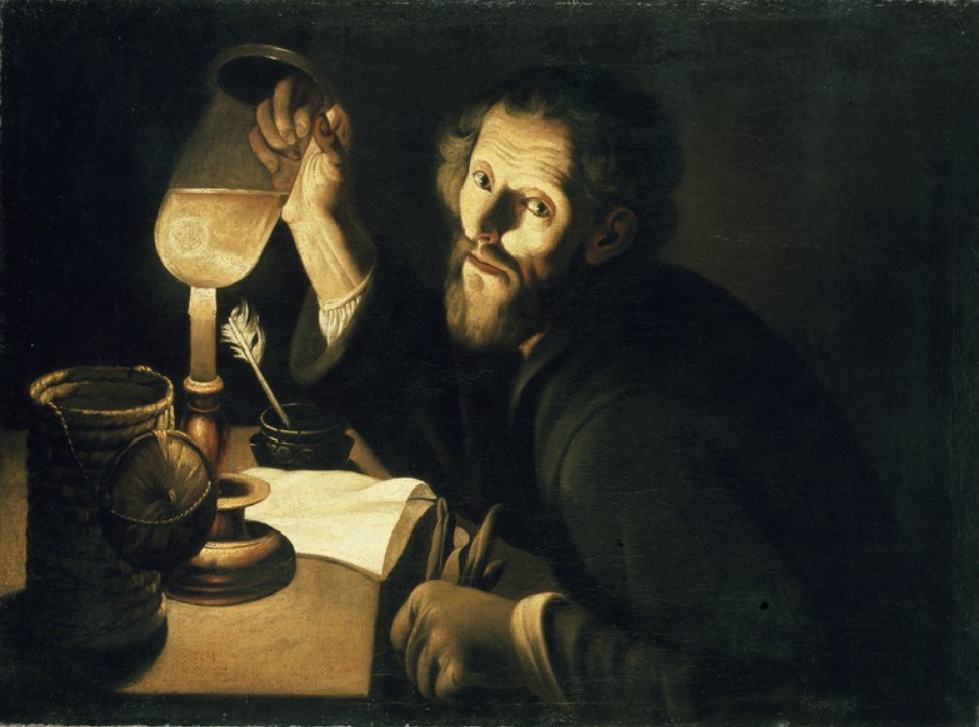
A Doctor Examining Urine. Trophime Bigot.

Many physicians in ancient history resorted to the inspection and examination of the urine of their patients. Hermogenes wrote about the color and other attributes of urine as indicators of certain diseases. Abdul Malik Ibn Habib of Andalusia (d. 862 AD) mentions numerous reports of urine examination throughout the Umayyad empire. Diabetes mellitus got its name because the urine is plentiful and sweet. The name uroscopy refers to any visual examination of the urine, including microscopy, although it often refers to the aforementioned prescientific or Proto-scientific forms of urine examination. Clinical urine tests today duly note the color, turbidity, and odor of urine but also include urinalysis, which chemically analyzes the urine and quantifies its constituents. A culture of the urine is performed when a urinary tract infection is suspected, as bacteriuria without symptoms does not require treatment. A microscopic examination of the urine may be helpful to identify organic or inorganic substrates and help in the diagnosis.

The color and volume of urine can be reliable indicators of hydration level. Clear and copious urine is generally a sign of adequate hydration. Dark urine is a sign of dehydration. The exception occurs when diuretics are consumed, in which case urine can be clear and copious and the person still be dehydrated.

== Uses ==
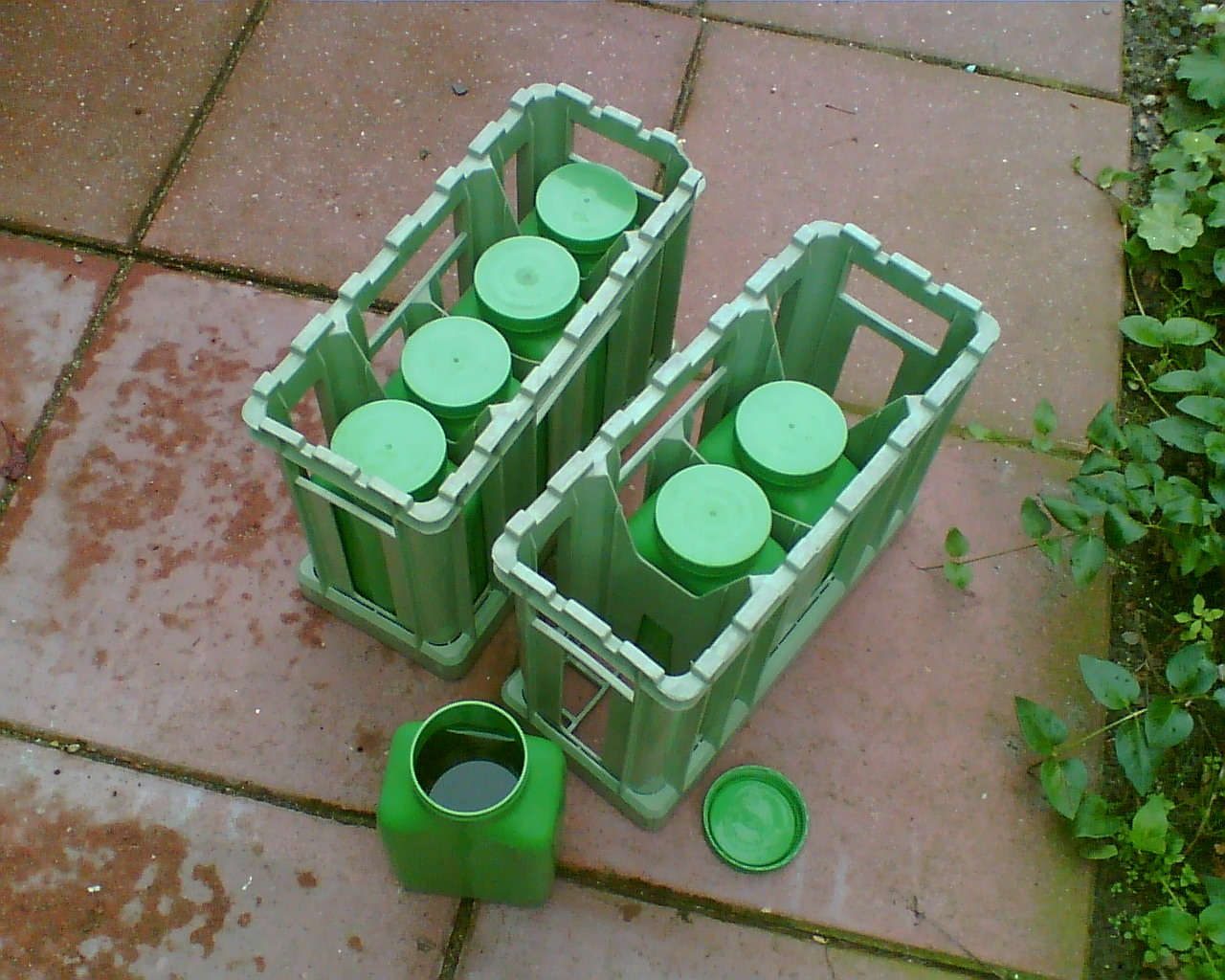
Urine of pregnant women in the first trimester is collected by a company which purifies the fertility hormone hCG from it (Ede, the Netherlands)

=== Source of medications ===
Urine contains proteins and other substances that are useful for medical therapy and are ingredients in many prescription drugs. Urine from postmenopausal women is rich in gonadotropins that can yield follicle stimulating hormone and luteinizing hormone for fertility therapy. One such commercial product is Pergonal.

Urine from pregnant women contains enough human chorionic gonadotropins for commercial extraction and purification to produce hCG medication. Pregnant mare urine is the source of estrogens, namely Premarin. Urine also contains antibodies, which can be used in diagnostic antibody tests for a range of pathogens, including HIV-1.

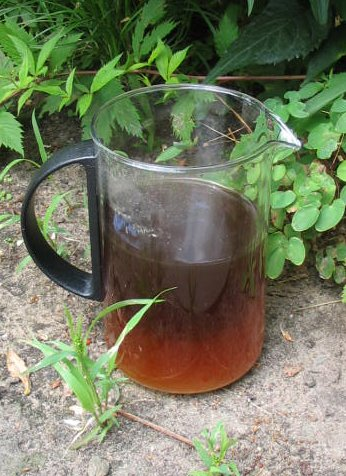
Urine after four months of storage (note the color and turbidity change compared to fresh human urine). During storage, the urea in urine is rapidly hydrolyzed by urease, creating ammonia. Collected urine can be used as a fertilizer.

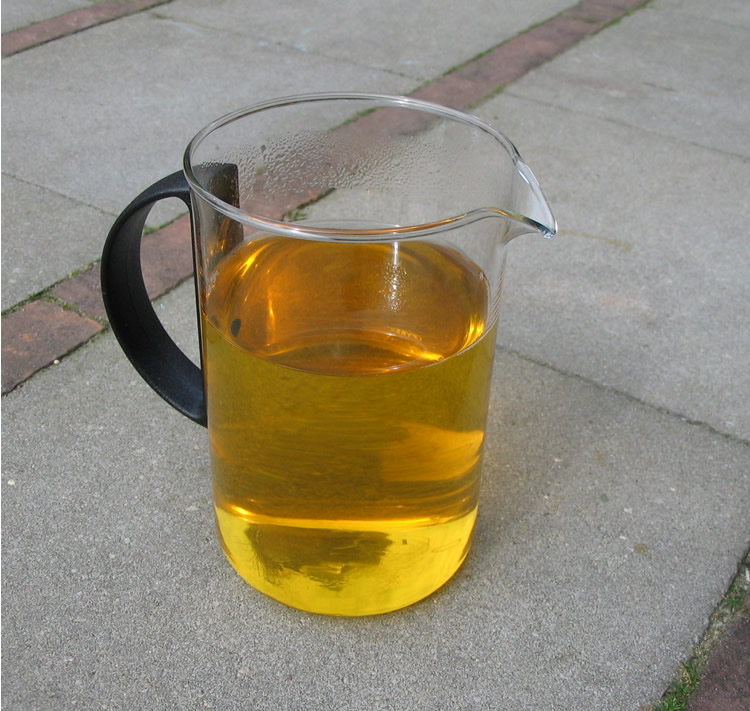
Fresh human urine after excretion

Urine can also be used to produce urokinase, which is used clinically as a thrombolytic agent.

=== Fertilizer ===
Applying urine as fertilizer has been called "closing the cycle of agricultural nutrient flows" or ecological sanitation or ecosan. Urine fertilizer is usually applied diluted with water because undiluted urine can chemically burn the leaves or roots of some plants, causing plant injury, particularly if the soil moisture content is low. The dilution also helps to reduce odor development following application. When diluted with water (at a 1:5 ratio for container-grown annual crops with fresh growing medium each season or a 1:8 ratio for more general use), it can be applied directly to soil as a fertilizer. The fertilization effect of urine has been found to be comparable to that of commercial nitrogen fertilizers. Urine may contain pharmaceutical residues (environmental persistent pharmaceutical pollutants). Concentrations of heavy metals such as lead, mercury, and cadmium, commonly found in sewage sludge, are much lower in urine.

Typical design values for nutrients excreted with urine are: 4 kg nitrogen per person per year, 0.36 kg phosphorus per person per year and 1.0 kg potassium per person per year. Based on the quantity of 1.5 L urine per day (or 550 L per year), the concentration values of macronutrients are as follows: 7.3 g/L N; .67 g/L P; 1.8 g/L K. These are design values but the actual values vary with diet. (Note: A formula for adjustment of excreta N and P values based on dietary characteristics is found in Jönsson 2004.) Urine's nutrient content, when expressed with the international fertilizer convention of N:P_{2}O_{5}:K_{2}O, is approximately 7:1.5:2.2. (Note: For the amount of other elements in urine, see Rose 2015 and Rich Earth 2021.) Since urine is rather diluted as a fertilizer compared to dry manufactured nitrogen fertilizers such as diammonium phosphate, the relative transport costs for urine are high as a lot of water needs to be transported.

The general limitations to using urine as fertilizer depend mainly on the potential for buildup of excess nitrogen (due to the high ratio of that macronutrient), and inorganic salts such as sodium chloride, which are also part of the wastes excreted by the renal system. Over-fertilization with urine or other nitrogen fertilizers can result in too much ammonia for plants to absorb, acidic conditions, or other phytotoxicity. Important parameters to consider while fertilizing with urine include salinity tolerance of the plant, soil composition, addition of other fertilizing compounds, and quantity of rainfall or other irrigation. It was reported in 1995 that urine nitrogen gaseous losses were relatively high and plant uptake lower than with labelled ammonium nitrate. In contrast, phosphorus was utilized at a higher rate than soluble phosphate. Urine can also be used safely as a source of nitrogen in carbon-rich compost.

=== Cleaning ===
Given that urea in urine breaks down into ammonia, urine has been used for cleaning. In pre-industrial times, urine was used – in the form of lant or aged urine – as a cleaning fluid. Urine was also used for whitening teeth in Ancient Rome.

=== Gunpowder ===
Urine was used before the development of a chemical industry in the manufacture of gunpowder. Urine, a nitrogen source, was used to moisten straw or other organic material, which was kept moist and allowed to rot for several months to over a year. The resulting salts were washed from the heap with water, which was evaporated to allow collection of crude saltpeter crystals, that were usually refined before being used in making gunpowder.

=== Survival uses ===
Urophagia is the consumption of urine. Urine was consumed in several ancient cultures for various health, healing, and cosmetic purposes. People have been known to drink urine in extreme cases of water scarcity.

The US Army Field Manual advises against drinking urine for survival. The manual explains that drinking urine tends to worsen rather than relieve dehydration due to the salts in it, and that urine should not be consumed in a survival situation, even when there is no other fluid available. In hot weather survival situations, where other sources of water are not available, soaking cloth (a shirt for example) in urine and putting it on the head can help cool the body.

During World War I, Germans experimented with numerous poisonous gases as weapons. After the first German chlorine gas attacks, Allied troops were supplied with masks of cotton pads that had been soaked in urine. It was believed that the ammonia in the pad neutralized the chlorine. These pads were held over the face until the soldiers could escape from the poisonous fumes.

Urban legend states that urine works well against jellyfish stings. This scenario has appeared many times in popular culture including in the Friends episode "The One With the Jellyfish", an early episode of Survivor, as well as the films The Real Cancun (2003), The Heartbreak Kid (2007) and The Paperboy (2012). However, at best it is ineffective, and in some cases this treatment may make the injury worse.

=== Textiles ===
Urine has often been used as a mordant to help prepare textiles, especially wool, for dyeing. In the Scottish Highlands and Hebrides, the process of "waulking" (fulling) woven wool is preceded by soaking in urine, preferably infantile.

=== Olfactory communication ===
Urine plays a role in olfactory communication, since it contains semiochemicals that act as pheromones. The urine of predator species often contains kairomones that serve as a repellent against their prey species.

== History ==
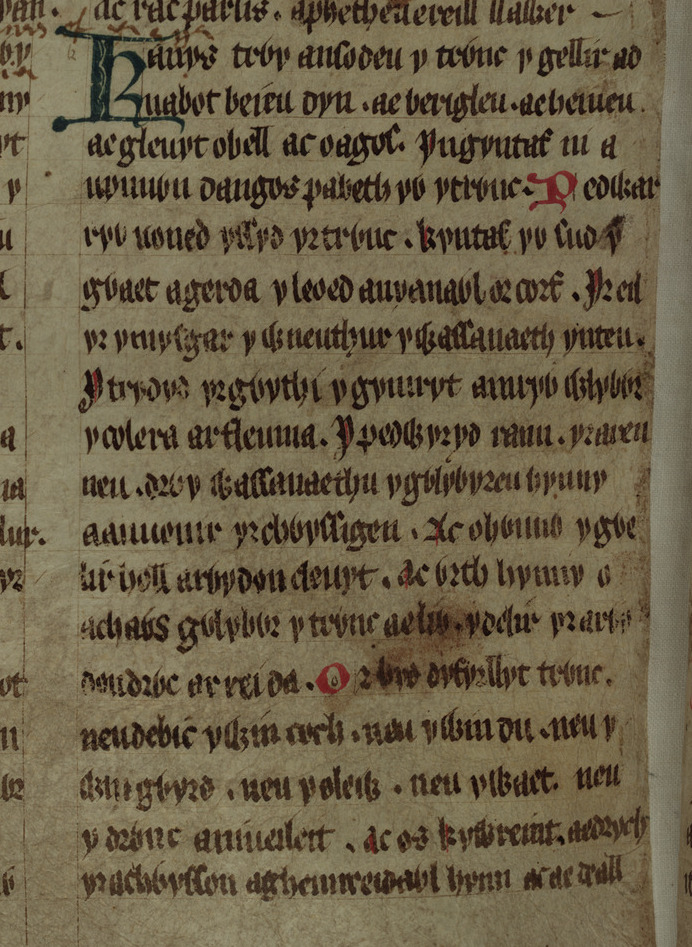
Medieval Welsh text from the Red Book of Hergest on uroscopy, called Ansoddau'r Trwnc (the 'Qualities of Urine'). Opening lines (translated): "Since it is through the qualities of the urine that a person's faults and his dangers and his diseases and his illness can be identified..."

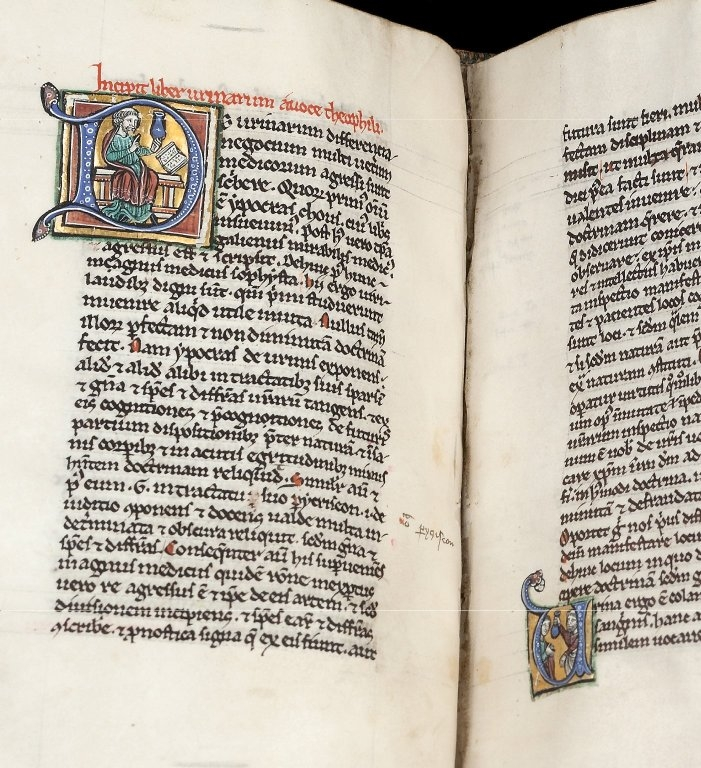
Image of two facing pages of the illuminated manuscript of "Isagoge", fols. 42b and 43a. On the top of the left hand page is an illuminated letter "D" – initial of De urinarum differencia negocium ('The matter of the differences of urines'). Inside the letter is a picture of a master on bench pointing at a raised flask while lecturing on the "Book on urines" of Theophilus. The right hand page is only shown in part. On its very bottom is an illuminated letter "U" – initial of Urina ergo est colamentum sanguinis ('Urine is the filtrate of the blood'). Inside the letter is a picture of a master holding up a flask while explaining the diagnostic significance of urine to a student or a patient. HMD Collection, MS E 78.

The fermentation of urine by bacteria produces a solution of ammonia; hence fermented urine was used in Classical Antiquity to wash cloth and clothing, to remove hair from hides in preparation for tanning, to serve as a mordant in dying cloth, and to remove rust from iron. Ancient Romans used fermented human urine (in the form of lant) to cleanse grease stains from clothing. The emperor Nero instituted a tax (Latin: vectigal urinae) on the urine industry, continued by his successor, Vespasian. The Latin saying Pecunia non olet ('money does not smell') is attributed to Vespasian – said to have been his reply to a complaint from his son about the unpleasant nature of the tax. Vespasian's name is still attached to public urinals in France (vespasiennes), Italy (vespasiani), and Romania (vespasiene).

Alchemists spent much time trying to extract gold from urine, which led to discoveries such as white phosphorus by German alchemist Hennig Brand when distilling fermented urine in 1669. In 1773 the French chemist Hilaire Rouelle discovered the organic compound urea by boiling urine dry.

== Language ==
The English word urine (/ˈjuːrɪn/, /ˈjɜːrɪn/) comes from the Latin urina (-ae, f.), which is cognate with ancient words in various Indo-European languages that concern water, liquid, diving, rain, and urination (for example Sanskrit varṣati meaning 'it rains' or vār meaning 'water' and Greek ourein meaning 'to urinate'). The onomatopoetic term piss predates the word urine, but is now considered vulgar. Urinate was at first used mostly in medical contexts. Piss is also used in such colloquialisms as to piss off, piss poor, and the slang expression pissing down to mean heavy rain. Euphemisms and expressions used between parents and children (such as wee, pee, number one and many others) have long existed.

Lant is a word for aged urine, originating from the Old English word hland referring to urine in general.

== See also ==
- Metabolic waste
- Urophagia, consumption of urine
- Urine therapy
- Urolagnia, an attraction to urine
