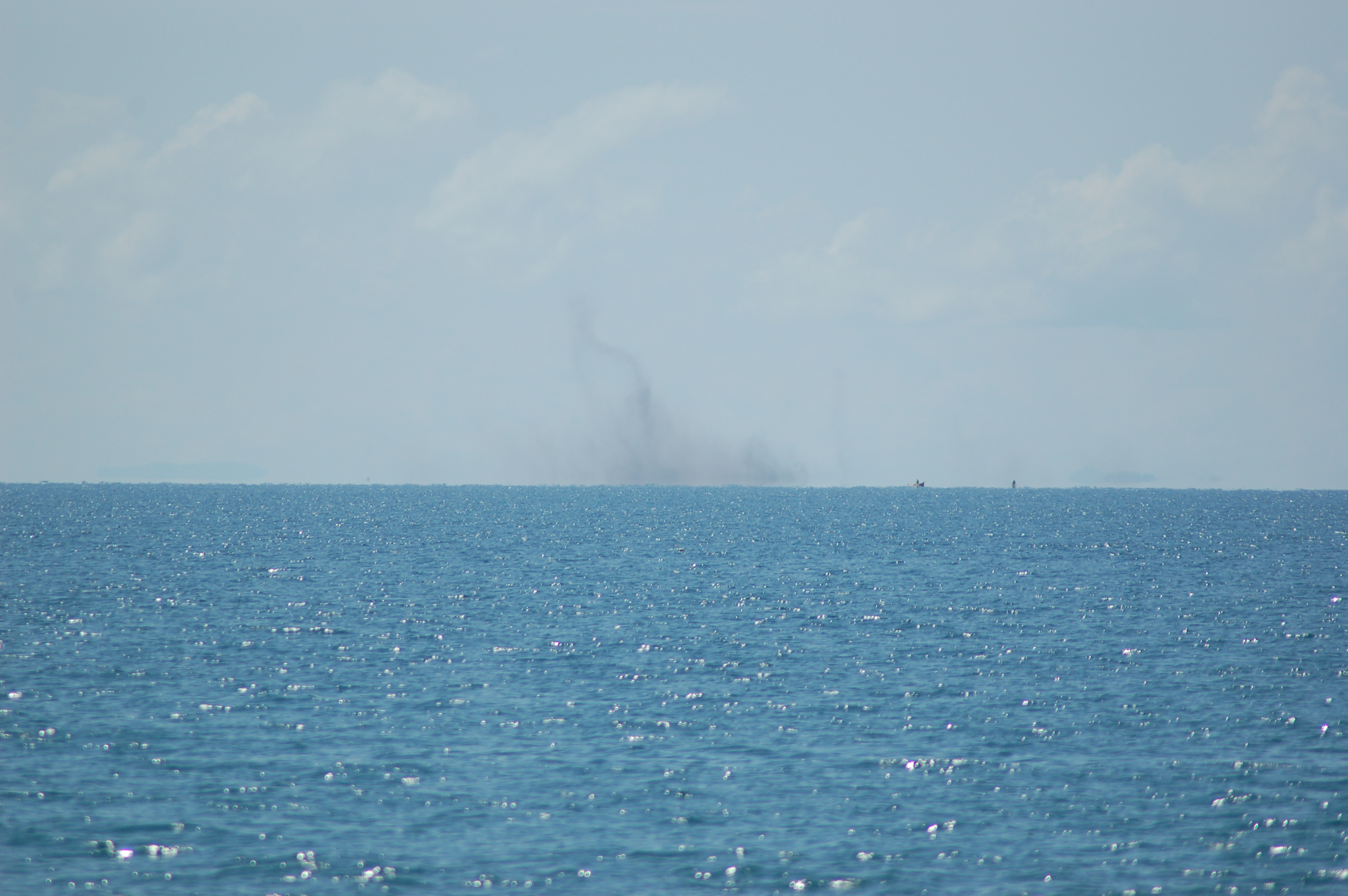
- Swarms of Chaoborus edulis, resembling distant plumes of smoke, over Lake Malawi's water

Scientific classification
- Domain: Eukaryota
- Kingdom: Animalia
- Phylum: Arthropoda
- Class: Insecta
- Order: Diptera
- Family: Chaoboridae
- Genus: Chaoborus
- Species: C. edulis

Binomial name
- Chaoborus edulis Edwards, 1930

= Chaoborus edulis =

Species of flies

Chaoborus edulis is a species of phantom midges (flies in the family Chaoboridae). Colloquially, the larval stage is termed a glassworm.

It is one of the species of insect processed into kunga cakes.
