= C. cooki =

C. cooki may refer to:

- Cephaloscyllium cooki, a little-known species of catshark
- Chaoborus cooki, a species of phantom midges
- Crambione cooki, a rare species of jellyfish
- Corallus cookii, Cook's tree boa or Cooke's tree boa, a species of snake
- Cyanopica cooki, Iberian magpie, a species of bird
- Cymatioa cooki, a species of saltwater clam
