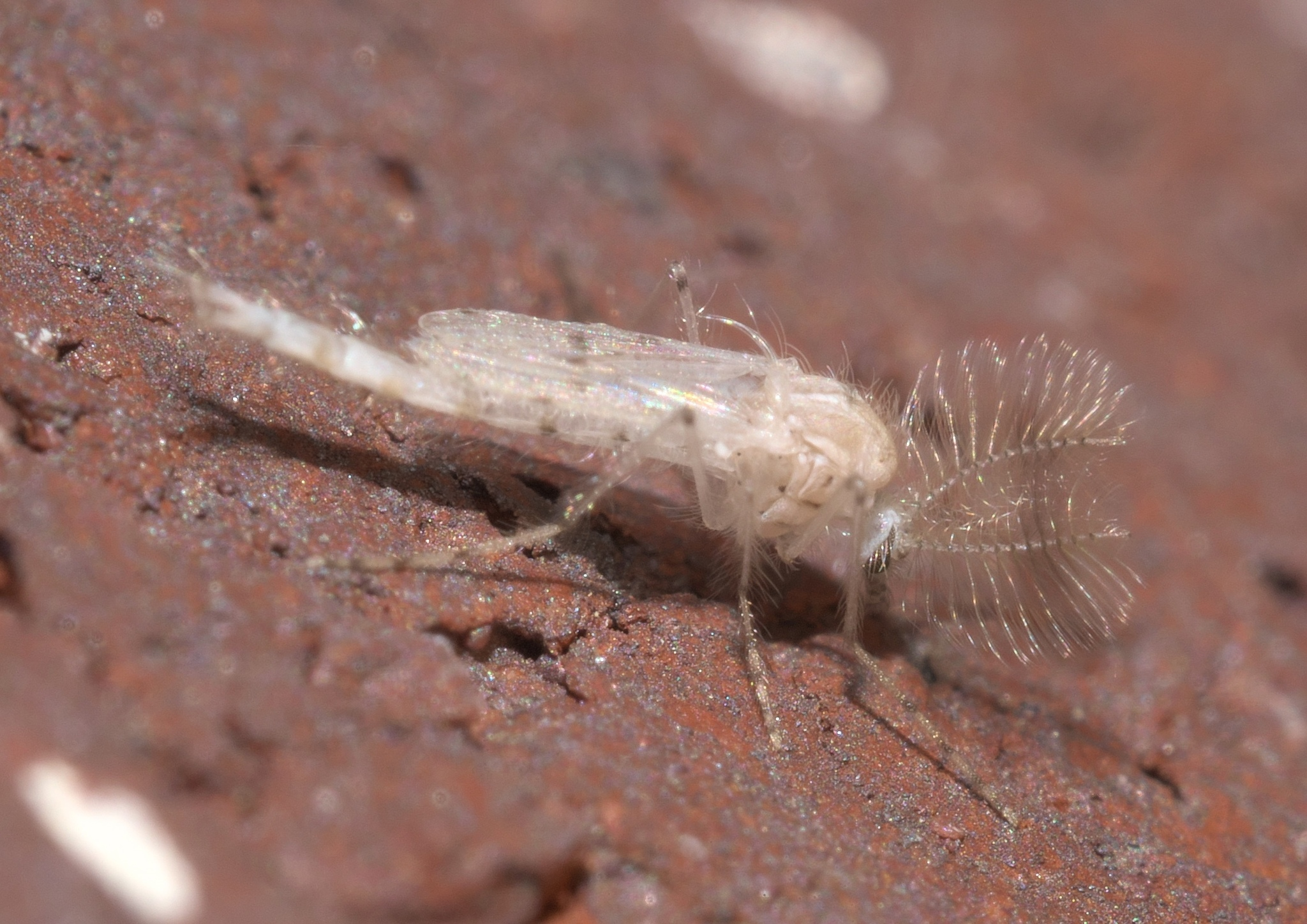
- Chaoborus albatus, Oklahoma

Scientific classification
- Domain: Eukaryota
- Kingdom: Animalia
- Phylum: Arthropoda
- Class: Insecta
- Order: Diptera
- Family: Chaoboridae
- Genus: Chaoborus
- Species: C. albatus

Binomial name
- Chaoborus albatus Johnson, 1921

= Chaoborus albatus =

Species of fly

Chaoborus albatus is a species of phantom midges in the family Chaoboridae.
