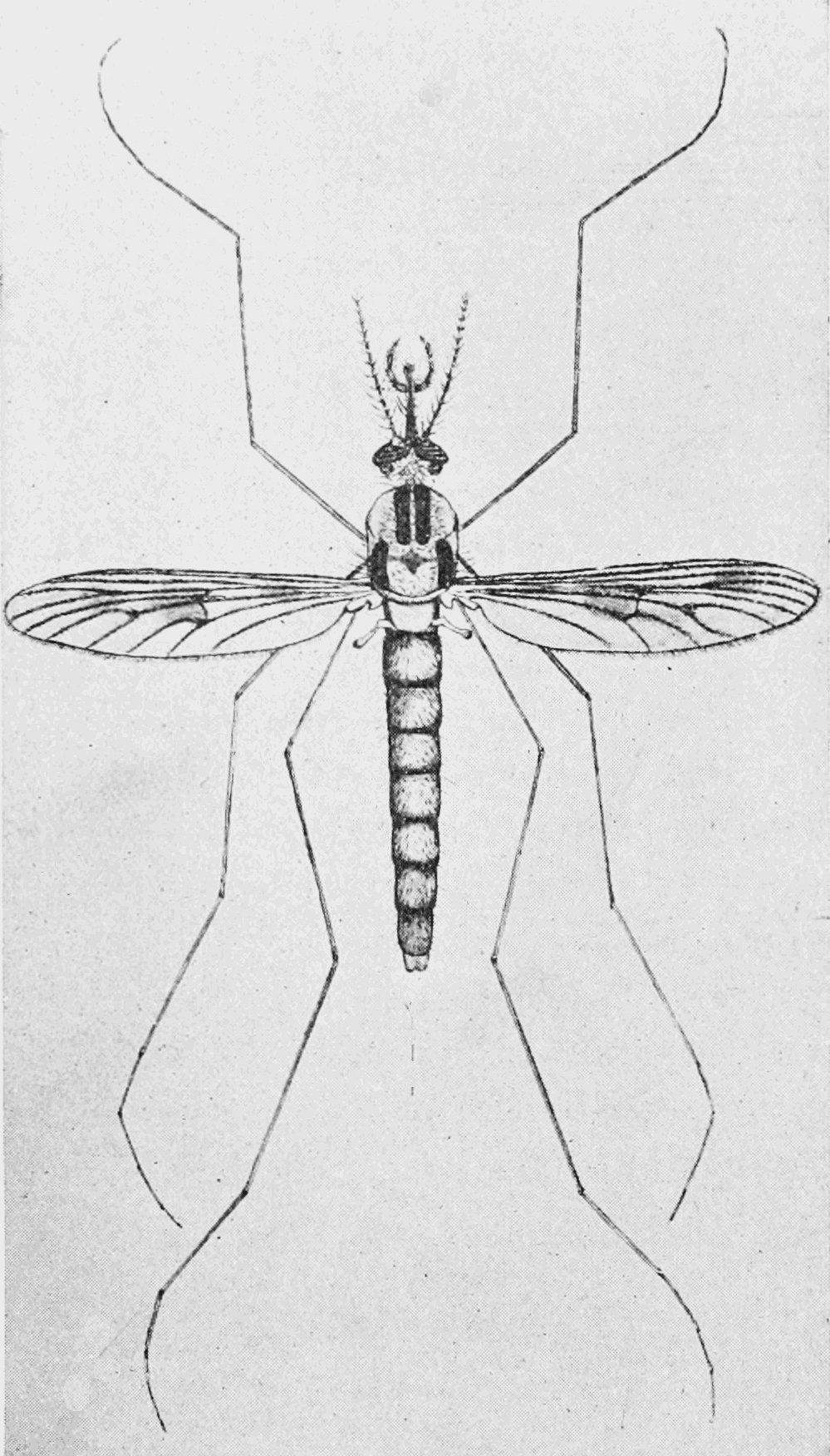

Scientific classification
- Domain: Eukaryota
- Kingdom: Animalia
- Phylum: Arthropoda
- Class: Insecta
- Order: Diptera
- Family: Chaoboridae
- Genus: Eucorethra
- Species: E. underwoodi

Binomial name
- Eucorethra underwoodi Underwood, 1903

Synonyms
- Pelorempis americana Johannsen, 1903

= Eucorethra underwoodi =

Species of fly

Eucorethra underwoodi is a species of phantom midges (flies in the family Chaoboridae).
