= Chaoborus festivus =

Scientific classification
- Domain: Eukaryota
- Kingdom: Animalia
- Phylum: Arthropoda
- Class: Insecta
- Order: Diptera
- Family: Chaoboridae
- Genus: Chaoborus
- Species: C. festivus

Binomial name
- Chaoborus festivus Dyar & Shannon, 1924

Synonyms
- Chaoborus annulatus Cook, 1956

Species of fly

Chaoborus festivus is a species of phantom midges (flies in the family Chaoboridae).
