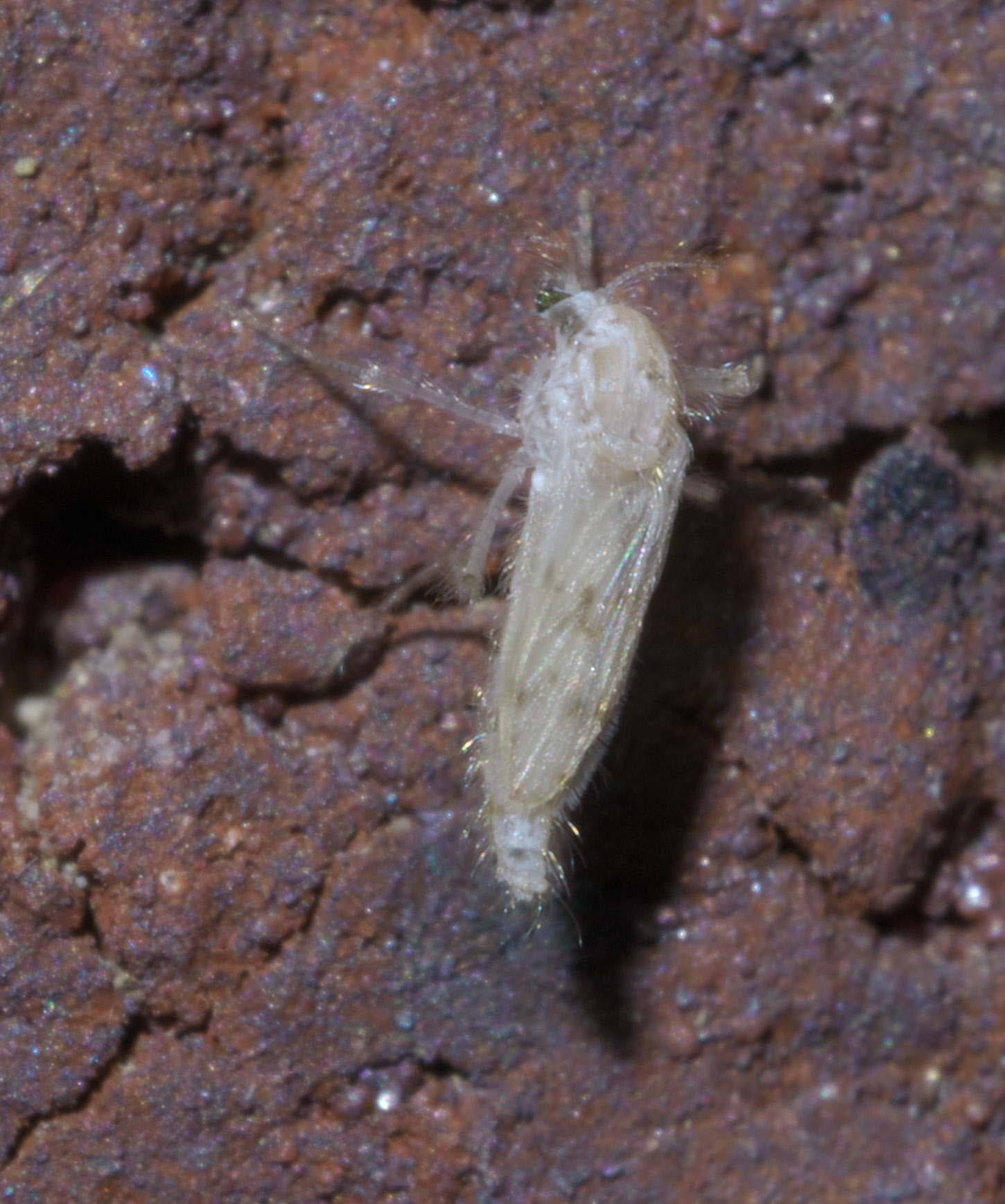

Scientific classification
- Domain: Eukaryota
- Kingdom: Animalia
- Phylum: Arthropoda
- Class: Insecta
- Order: Diptera
- Family: Chaoboridae
- Genus: Chaoborus
- Species: C. maculipes

Binomial name
- Chaoborus maculipes Stone, 1965

= Chaoborus maculipes =

Species of fly

Chaoborus maculipes is a species of phantom midges (flies in the family Chaoboridae).

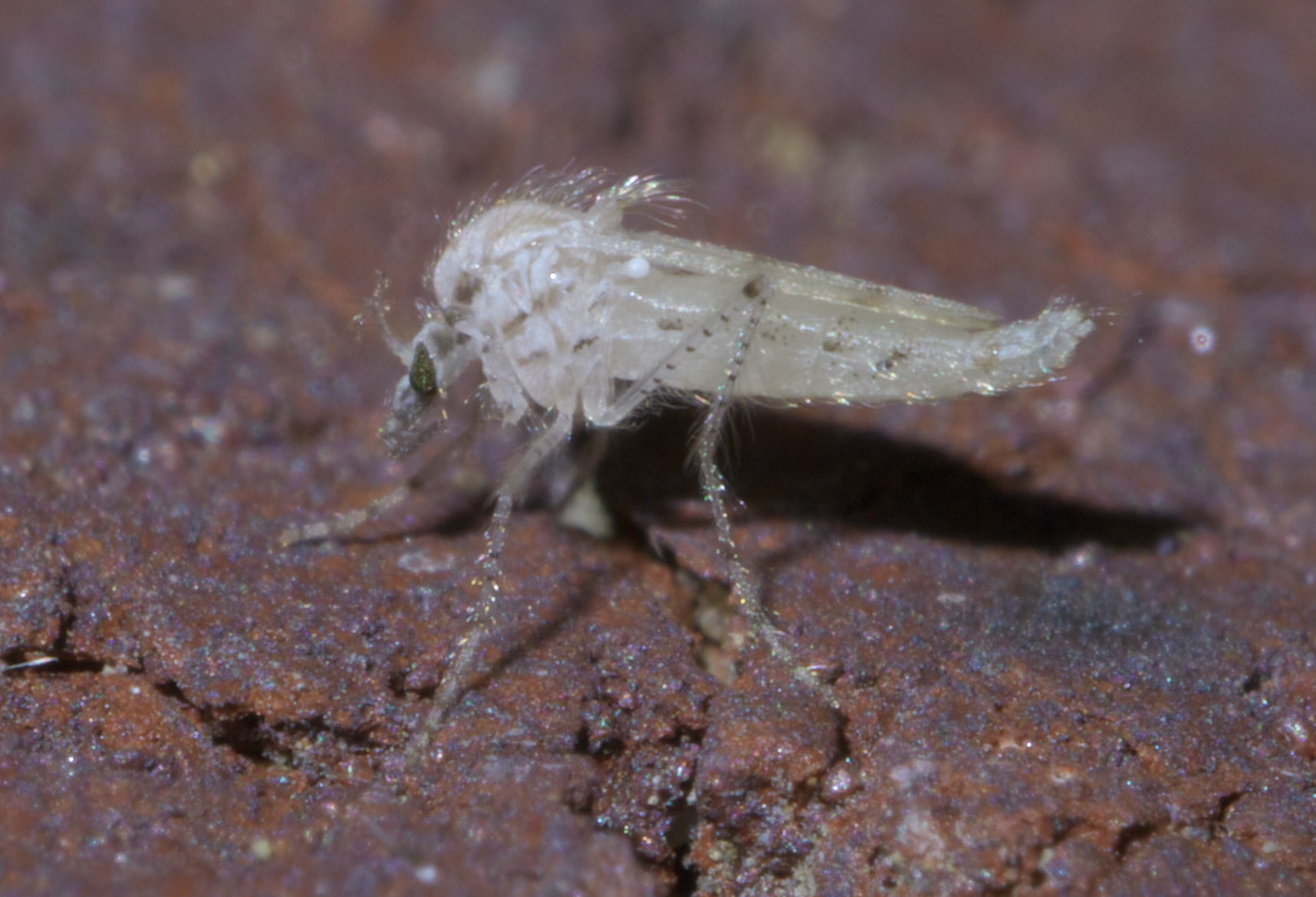
