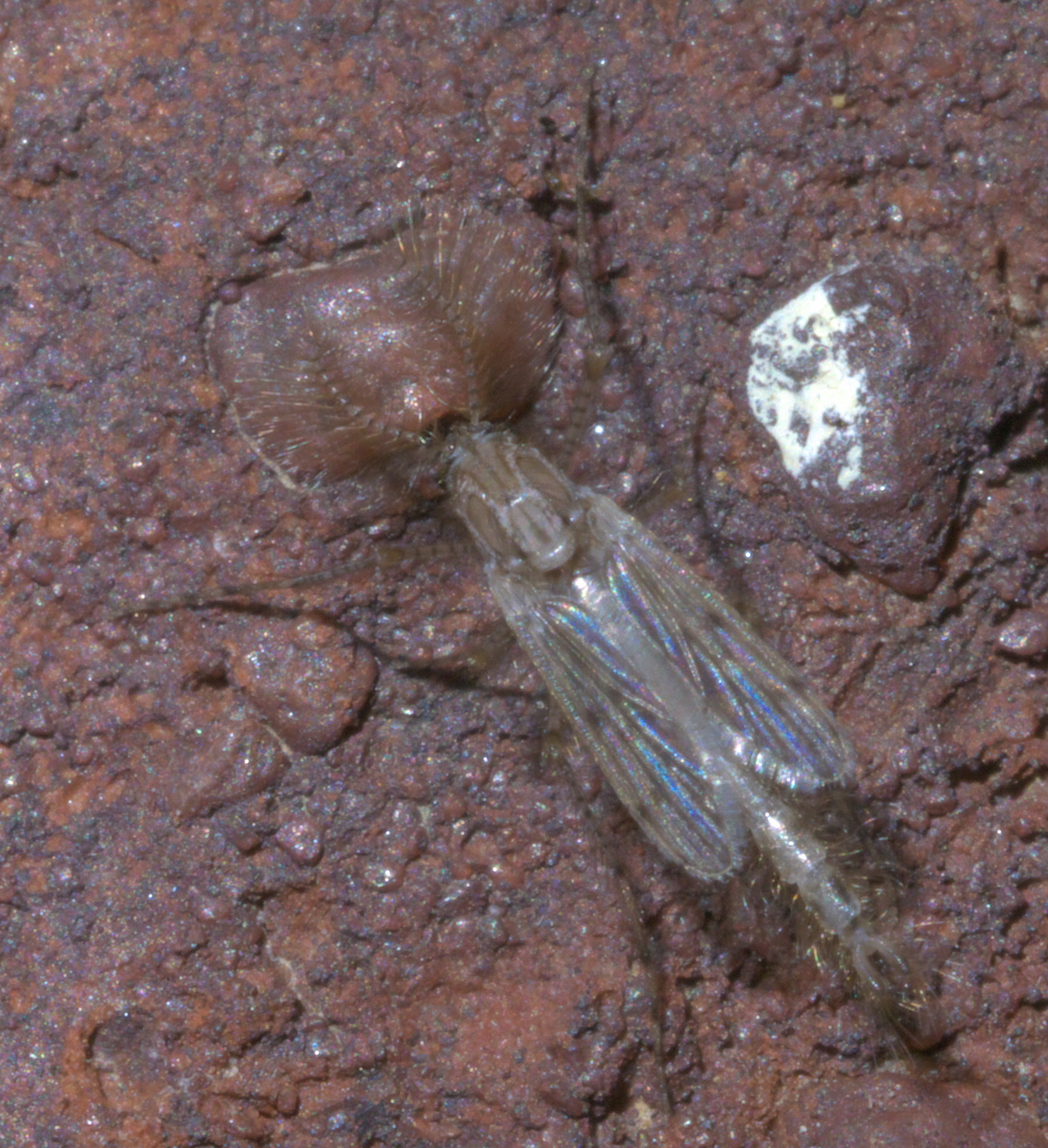

Scientific classification
- Kingdom: Animalia
- Phylum: Arthropoda
- Clade: Pancrustacea
- Class: Insecta
- Order: Diptera
- Family: Chaoboridae
- Genus: Chaoborus
- Species: C. punctipennis

Binomial name
- Chaoborus punctipennis (Say, 1823)

Synonyms
- Corethra appendiculata Herrick, 1884; Corethra punctipennis Say, 1823

= Chaoborus punctipennis =

Species of fly

Chaoborus punctipennis is a species of phantom midges (flies in the family Chaoboridae).

== Survival patterns ==
Chaoborus punctipennis tend to move vertically through the levels of the water to avoid predation by fish. According to Rine and Kesler, “an oxygen concentration below 2.0 mg/l could not be tolerated by fish. Comparison of the depths at which this critical oxygen concentration occurred with mean larval depth showed a significant correlation (P<0.05), supporting the hypothesis that diel vertical migration affords protection from fish predation”.

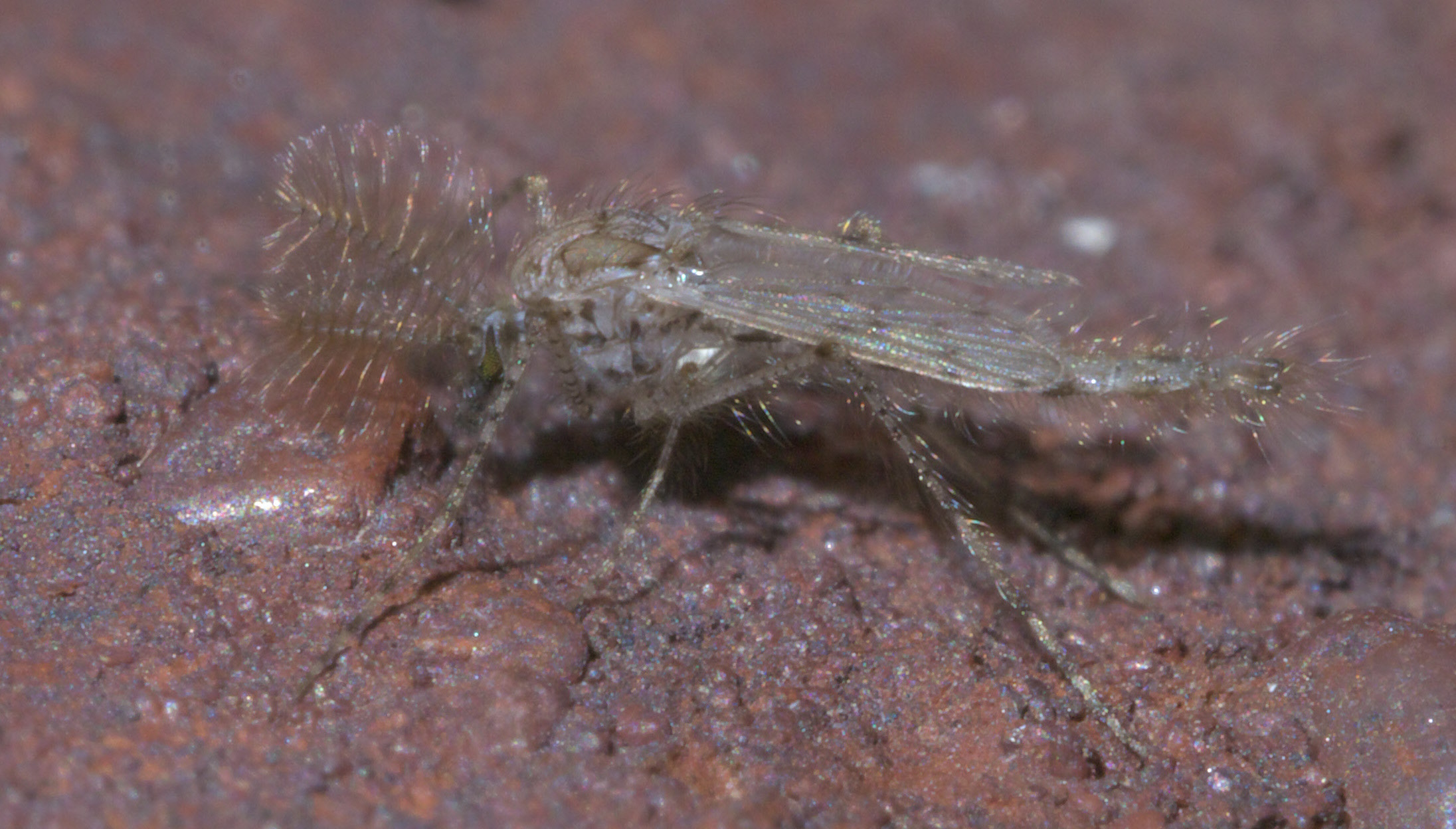
