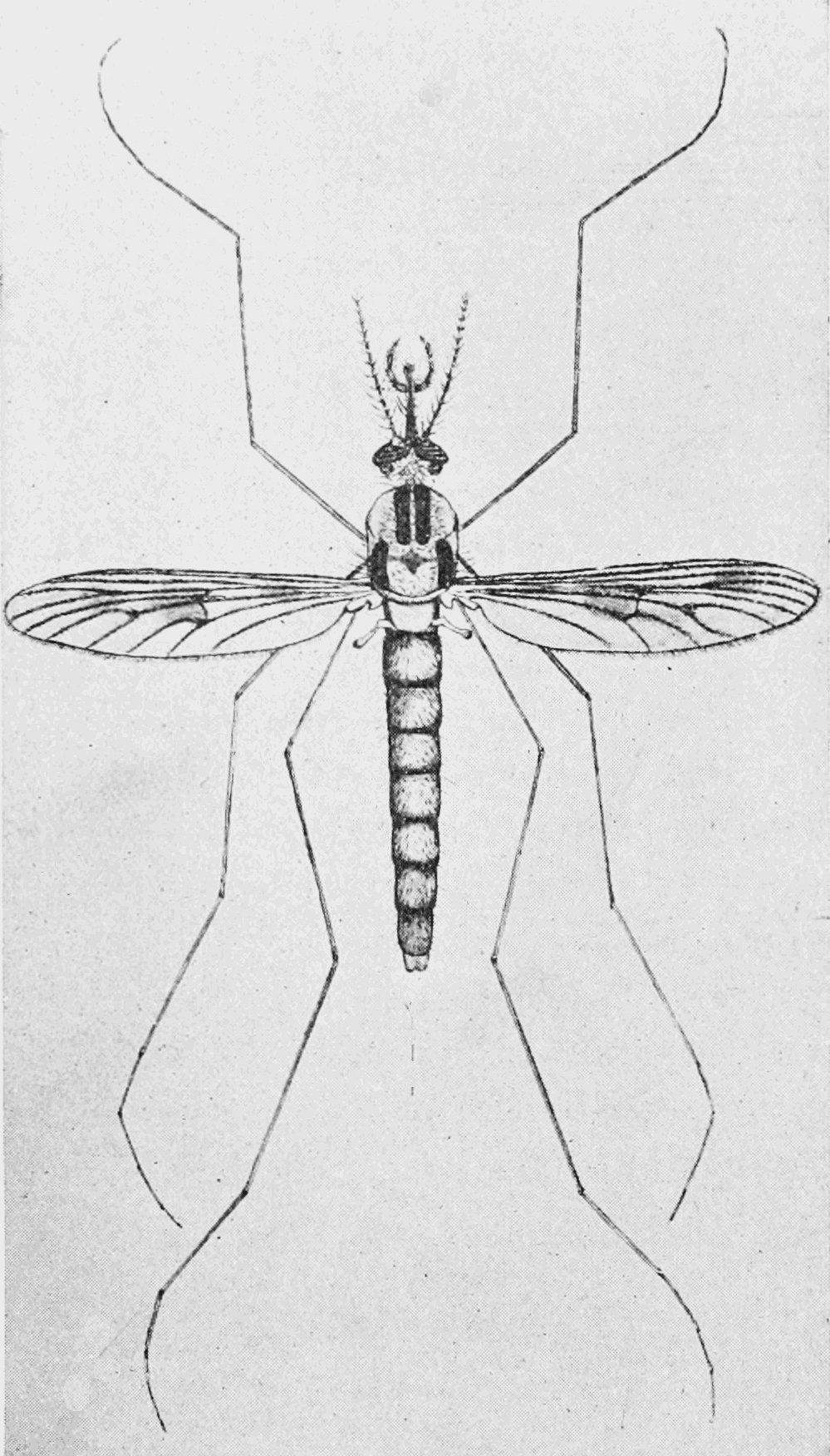
- Illustration of Eucorethra underwoodi

Scientific classification
- Domain: Eukaryota
- Kingdom: Animalia
- Phylum: Arthropoda
- Class: Insecta
- Order: Diptera
- Family: Chaoboridae
- Genus: Eucorethra; Coquillet, 1903

= Eucorethra =

Genus of flies

Eucorethra is a monotypic genus of phantom midges (flies in the family Chaoboridae). The sole species is Eucorethra underwoodi Underwood, 1903.
