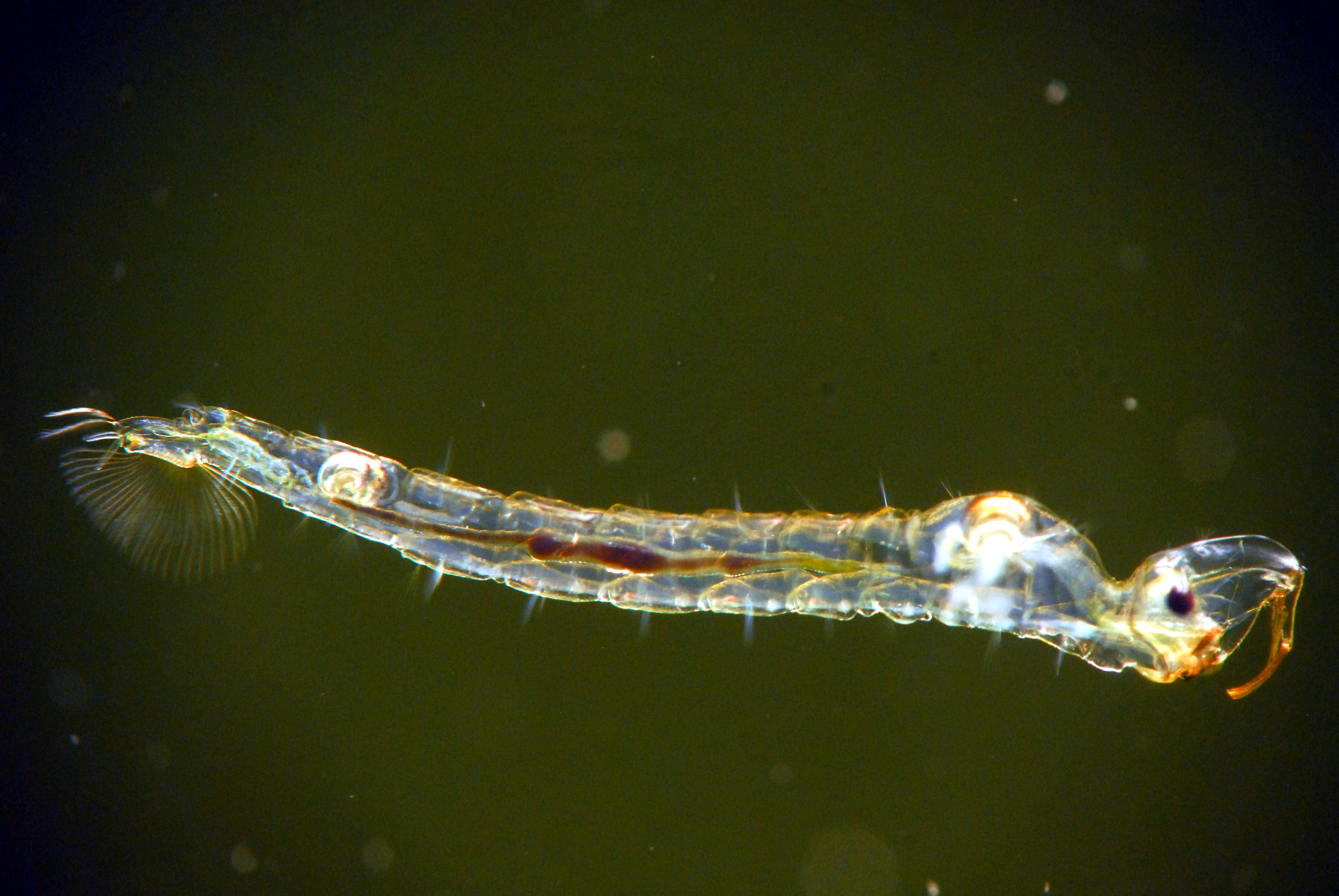

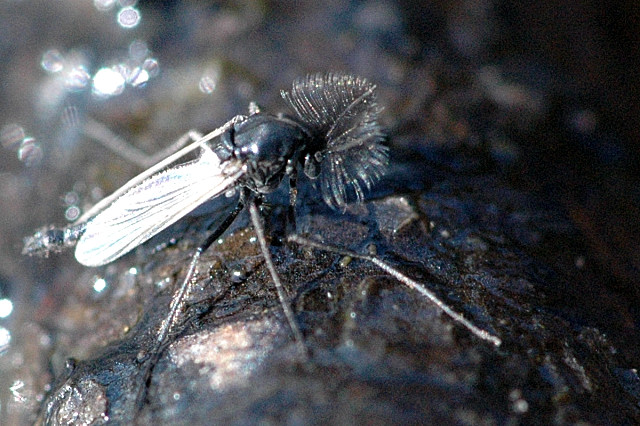
- Aquatic larvae (above) and winged adult (below)

Scientific classification
- Kingdom: Animalia
- Phylum: Arthropoda
- Clade: Pancrustacea
- Class: Insecta
- Order: Diptera
- Family: Chaoboridae
- Genus: Chaoborus; Lichtenstein, 1800

Synonyms
- Sayomyia Coquillett, 1903

= Chaoborus =

Genus of flies

Chaoborus is a genus of midges in the family Chaoboridae. The larvae are known as glassworms because they are transparent. They can be found commonly in lakes all over the world and can be up to 2 cm (0.8 in). The adults are sometimes called phantom midges or lake flies.

== Appearance ==
Glassworms are almost entirely transparent, except for pairs of black kidney-shaped airsacks in the front and the back of the body. They represent the remnants of their highly reduced tracheal system, and are used to move up and down the water column. Glassworms breathe through the end of their abdomen and have two small eyes at the front of their bodies.

== Behavior ==
Chaoborus adults do not bite mammals or suck blood. Larvae live in open waters and even sediments, where there may be little oxygen for them to breathe. In some lakes they can be found as deep as 70 m (230 ft). In these deep anoxic waters they can avoid predation more easily than near the surface. They get around the fact that a normal air filled invertebrate tracheal system would fail at these depths by having it reduced to just two air sacs. They are predaceous, and catch their prey with their modified prehensile antennae. They look somewhat like mosquito larvae, on which they prey and frequently destroy in large numbers. Chaoborus are considered opportunistic eaters, as their main diet consists of copepods and cladocerans, though they are believed to prefer copepods. However, they tend to select whatever prey enters its strike zone as it is not known for chasing prey. Prey selection also varies between species as head and mandible size dictate maximum prey size.

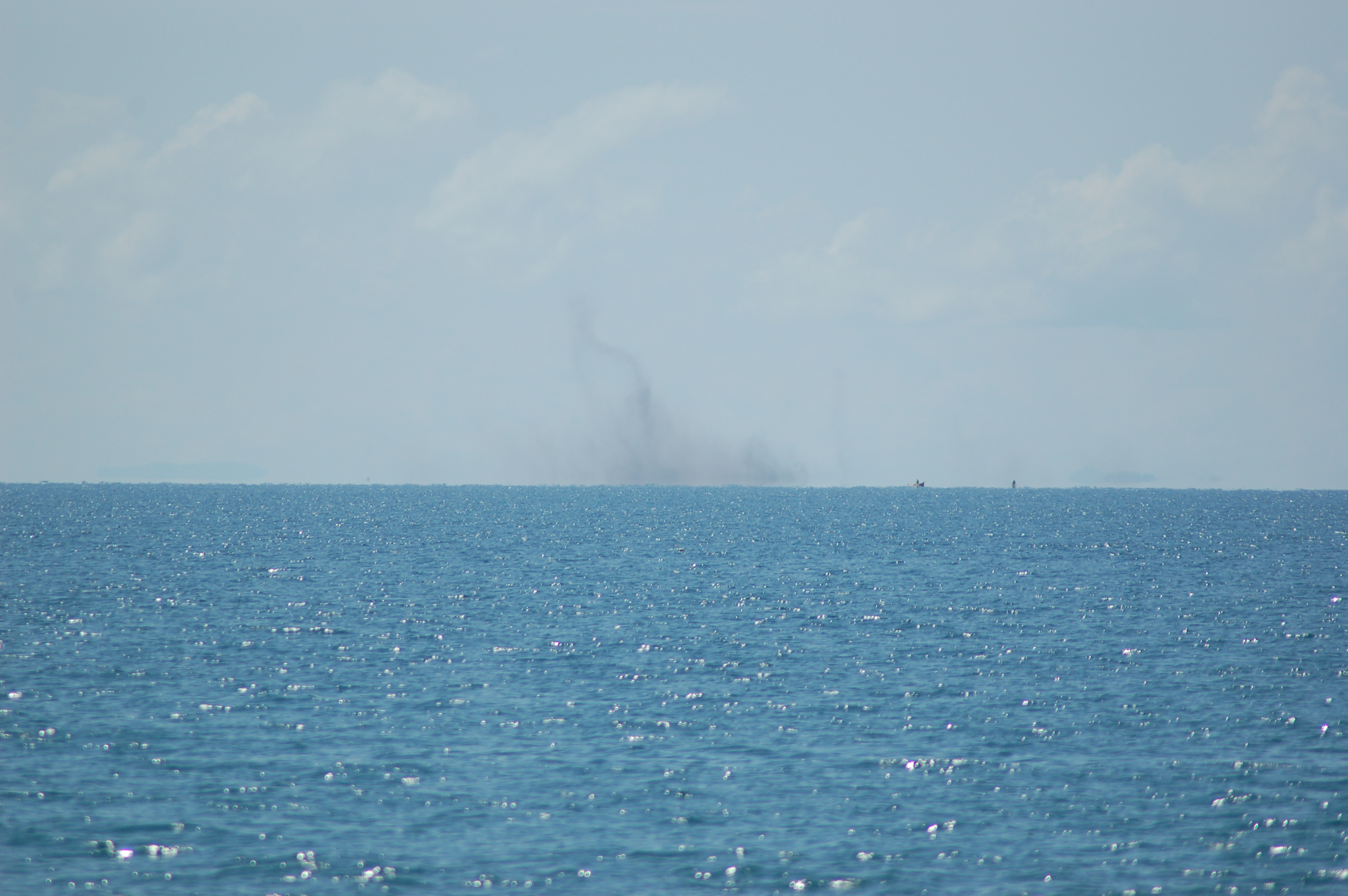
Huge swarms of Chaoborus edulis, resembling distant plumes of smoke over Lake Malawi's water

Their main predator is fish, which can cause a behavioral response due to light factors influenced by their presence. This fish factor causes an increase in the average depth the individuals can be found. This vertical migration behavior is believed to be a chemical reaction, rather than a visual or mechanical. In the African Great Lakes of Malawi and Victoria (but not Tanganyika where this genus is absent, perhaps because of chemical factors), huge swarms of Chaoborus midges occur and are collected by local people to make kungu cakes, biscuits or burgers, a local delicacy rich in protein. David Livingstone (1865) claimed that they "tasted not unlike caviare".

=== Life cycle ===
Chaoborus spends the majority of its life in its larval stage, living only long enough to mate and lay eggs as an adult (usually less than 10 days). There are four instars, followed by a brief pupal stage, before the insect reaches adulthood. Most Chaoborus species are univoltine, or live for only one year, though some populations have been recorded as having a two-year generation time. Timing of pupation depends on local environmental conditions, though generally occurs after any ice has thawed and temperatures in the water begin to rise again.

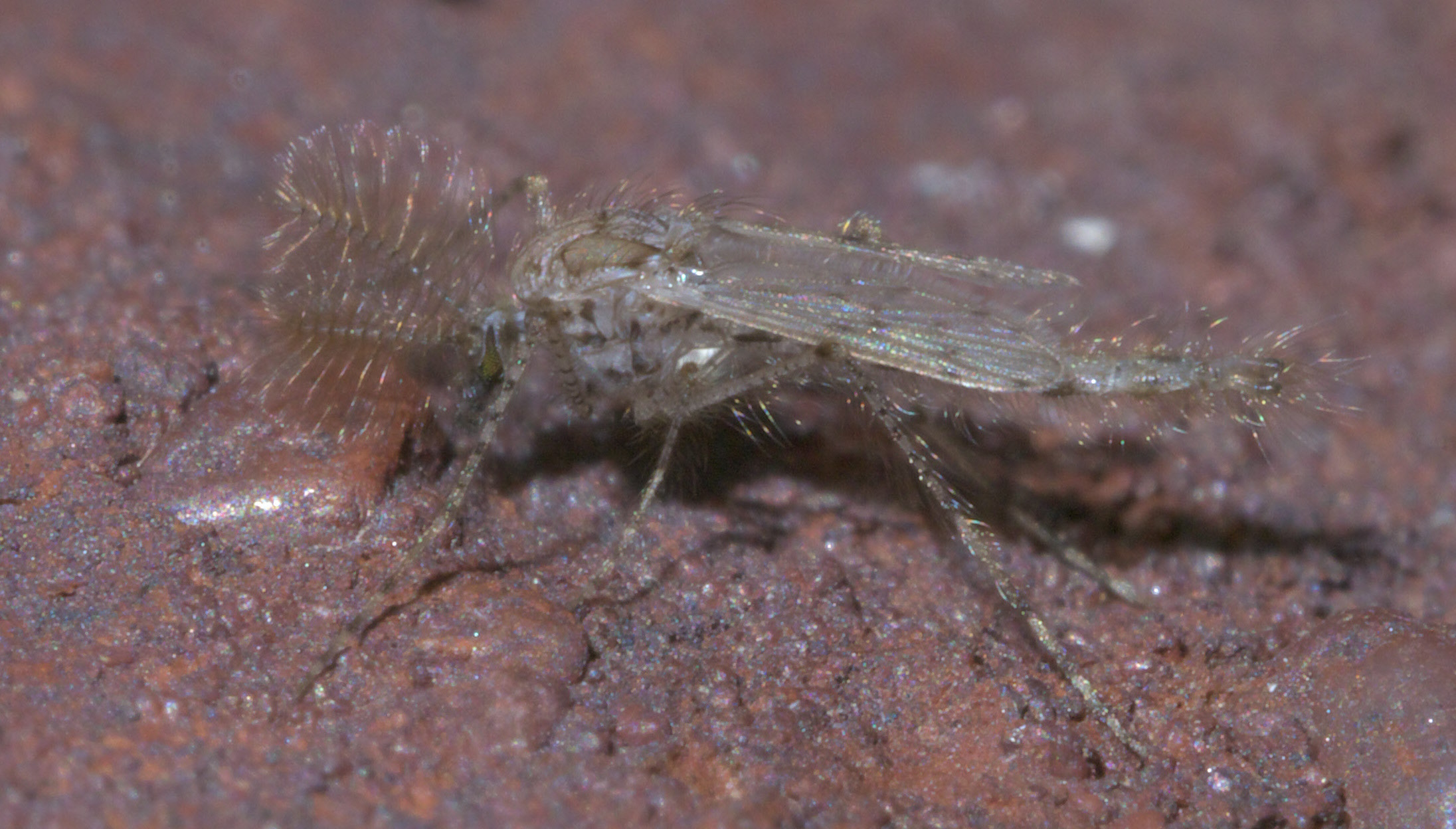
Chaoborus punctipennis adult

== Collection ==
The simplest way to collect glassworms is by a plankton net. They can be found in almost all water, but most abound in fish-free quarry ponds during winter. Glassworms are very easy to store if the water is kept cold and aerated. They are very tolerant to bad water conditions, including chlorine. They are sometimes collected and sold as fish food.

== Species ==
These 44 species belong to the genus Chaoborus:

- Chaoborus albatus Johnson, 1921^{i g b}
- Chaoborus americanus (Johannsen, 1903)^{i c g}
- Chaoborus annandalei Edwards, 1930^{c g}
- Chaoborus anomalus Edwards, 1930^{c g}
- Chaoborus antillum Knab, 1913^{c g}
- Chaoborus asiaticus (Giles, 1901)^{c g}
- Chaoborus astictopus Dyar & Shannon, 1924^{i c g b} (clear lake gnat)
- Chaoborus australis Sahnnon & Ponte, 1928^{c g}
- Chaoborus bolviensis Lane & Heredia, 1956^{c g}
- Chaoborus brasiliensis (Theobald, 1901)^{c g}
- Chaoborus brevisector Edwards, 1930^{c g}
- Chaoborus ceratopogones (Theobald, 1903)^{c g}
- Chaoborus cooki Saether, 1970^{i c g b}
- Chaoborus cornfordii (Theobald, 1903)^{c g}
- Chaoborus crystallinus (De Geer, 1776)^{i c g}
- Chaoborus depereti Meunier, 1915^{c g}
- Chaoborus edulis Edwards, 1930^{c g}
- Chaoborus elnorae Shannon & Ponte, 1928^{c g}
- Chaoborus festivus Dyar & Shannon, 1924^{i c g b}
- Chaoborus flavicans (Meigen, 1830)^{i c g b}
- Chaoborus flavidulus Edwards, 1930^{c g}
- Chaoborus freemani Verbeke, 1958^{c g}
- Chaoborus fryeri Verbeke, 1958^{c g}
- Chaoborus fuscinervis Edwards, 1930^{c g}
- Chaoborus indicus (Giles, 1904)^{c g}
- Chaoborus longicercus Colless, 1986^{c g}
- Chaoborus maculipes Stone, 1965^{i c g b}
- Chaoborus magnificus Lane, 1942^{c g}
- Chaoborus manilensis (Schiner, 1868)^{c g}
- Chaoborus microstictus Edwards, 1930^{c g}
- Chaoborus nyblaei (Zetterstedt, 1838)^{c g}
- Chaoborus obscuripes (Wulp, 1859)^{i c g}
- Chaoborus ornatipennis Colless, 1986^{c g}
- Chaoborus pallidipes (Theobald, 1911)^{c g}
- Chaoborus pallidus (Fabricius, 1781)^{c g}
- Chaoborus punctilliger Colless, 1986^{c g}
- Chaoborus punctipennis (Say, 1823)^{i c g b}
- Chaoborus queenslandensis (Theobald, 1905)^{c g}
- Chaoborus sampsera Ogawa & Judd, 2008^{c g}
- Chaoborus souzai Lane, 1939^{c g}
- Chaoborus stonei Lane, 1942^{c g}
- Chaoborus trivittatus (Loew, 1862)^{i c g b}
- Chaoborus unicolor Lane, 1942^{c g}
- Chaoborus vagus Colless, 1986^{c g}

Data sources: i = ITIS, c = Catalogue of Life, g = GBIF, b = Bugguide.net
