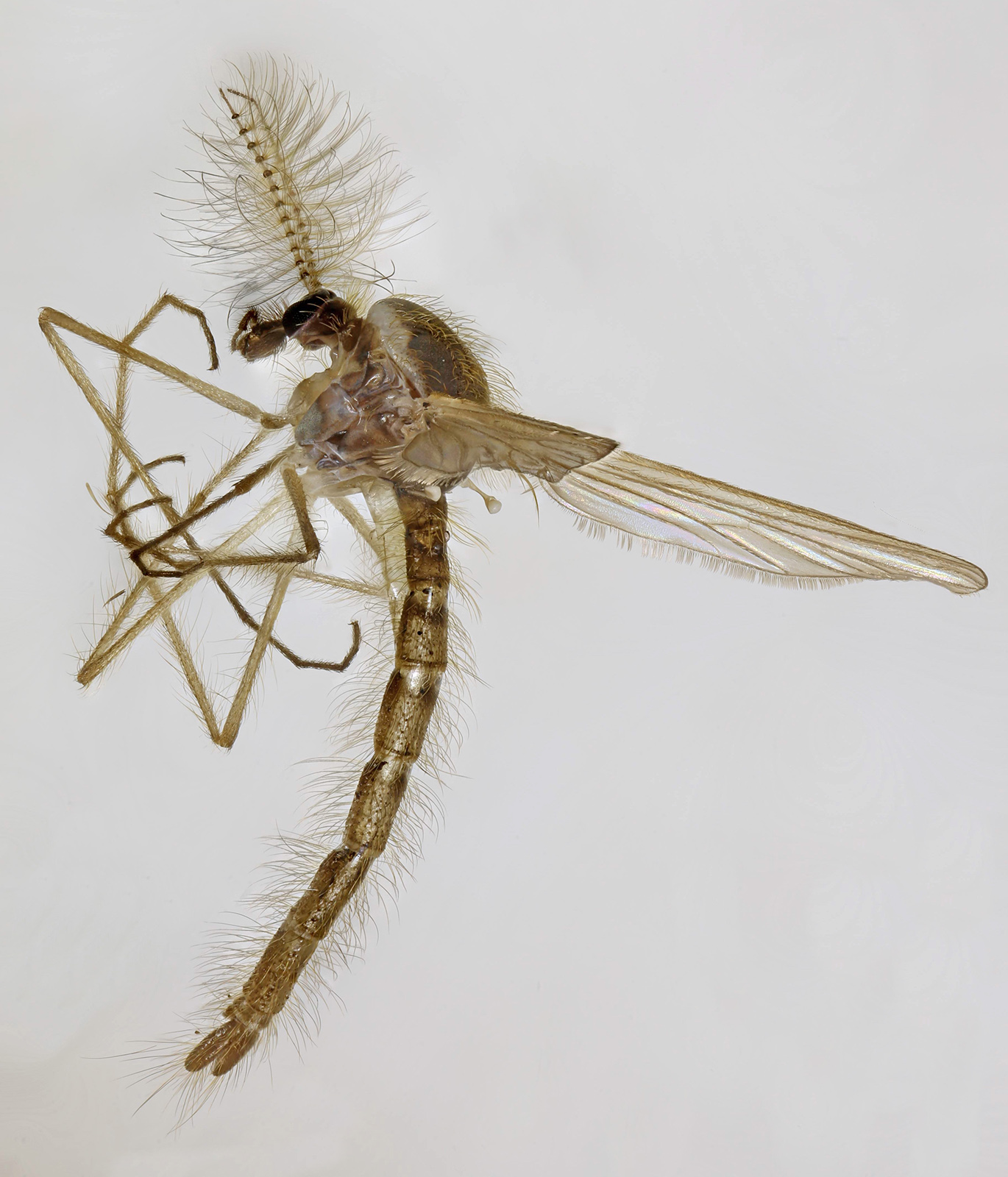
- Chaoborus flavicans North Wales

Scientific classification
- Kingdom: Animalia
- Phylum: Arthropoda
- Class: Insecta
- Order: Diptera
- Family: Chaoboridae
- Genus: Chaoborus
- Species: C. flavicans

Binomial name
- Chaoborus flavicans (Meigen, 1830)

= Chaoborus flavicans =

Species of fly

Chaoborus flavicans is a species of fly in the family Chaoboridae. It is found in the Palearctic.
