= Lant =

Aged or fermented urine

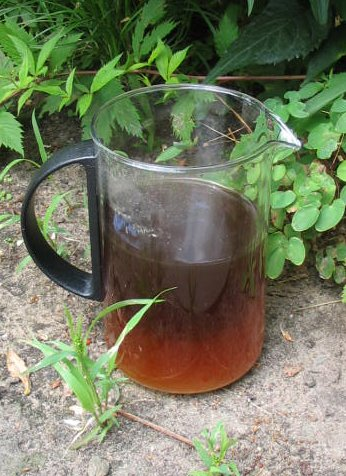
A container filled with lant, in this case urine aged about four months.

Lant is aged urine. The term comes from Old English hland, which referred to urine. Collected urine was put aside to ferment until used for its chemical content in many pre-industrial processes, such as cleaning and production.

== History ==
Because of its ammonium content, lant was most commonly used for floor cleaning and laundry. According to early housekeeping guides, bedpans would be collected by one of the younger male servants and put away to ferment to a mild caustic before use.

In larger cottage industries, lant was used in wool-processing. In times of urgent need and in districts where these were the chief industries, the whole town was expected to contribute to its supply.

"Lant. Stale urine. It was preserved in a tank and having been mixed with lime used for dressing wheat before it was sown to keep the birds from picking up the seeds."

— Sidney Addy, Glossary of Sheffield Words 1888
