= Gedanoborus =

Scientific classification
- Kingdom: Animalia
- Phylum: Arthropoda
- Class: Insecta
- Order: Diptera
- Family: Chaoboridae
- Genus: Gedanoborus; Szadziewski & Gilka, 2007

Genus of insects

Gedanoborus is a genus of flies belonging to the family Chaoboridae.

The species of this genus are found in Central Europe.

Species:

- Gedanoborus kerneggeri Szadziewski & Gilka, 2007
- Gedanoborus resinatus Seredszus & Wichard, 2009
