= Chaoborus cooki =

Scientific classification
- Domain: Eukaryota
- Kingdom: Animalia
- Phylum: Arthropoda
- Class: Insecta
- Order: Diptera
- Family: Chaoboridae
- Genus: Chaoborus
- Species: C. cooki

Binomial name
- Chaoborus cooki Saether, 1970

Species of fly

Chaoborus cooki is a species of phantom midges (insects in the family Chaoboridae).
