= Kunga cake =

East African food made of insects

Nkhungu cake
- Alternative names: Nkhungu cake
- Region or state: African Great Lakes
- Main ingredients: Chaoborus edulis

Kunga cake or kungu is a food dish made of densely compressed midges or flies. It is found in the African Great Lakes region, specifically countries surrounding Lake Malawi (Tanzania, Malawi, and Mozambique).

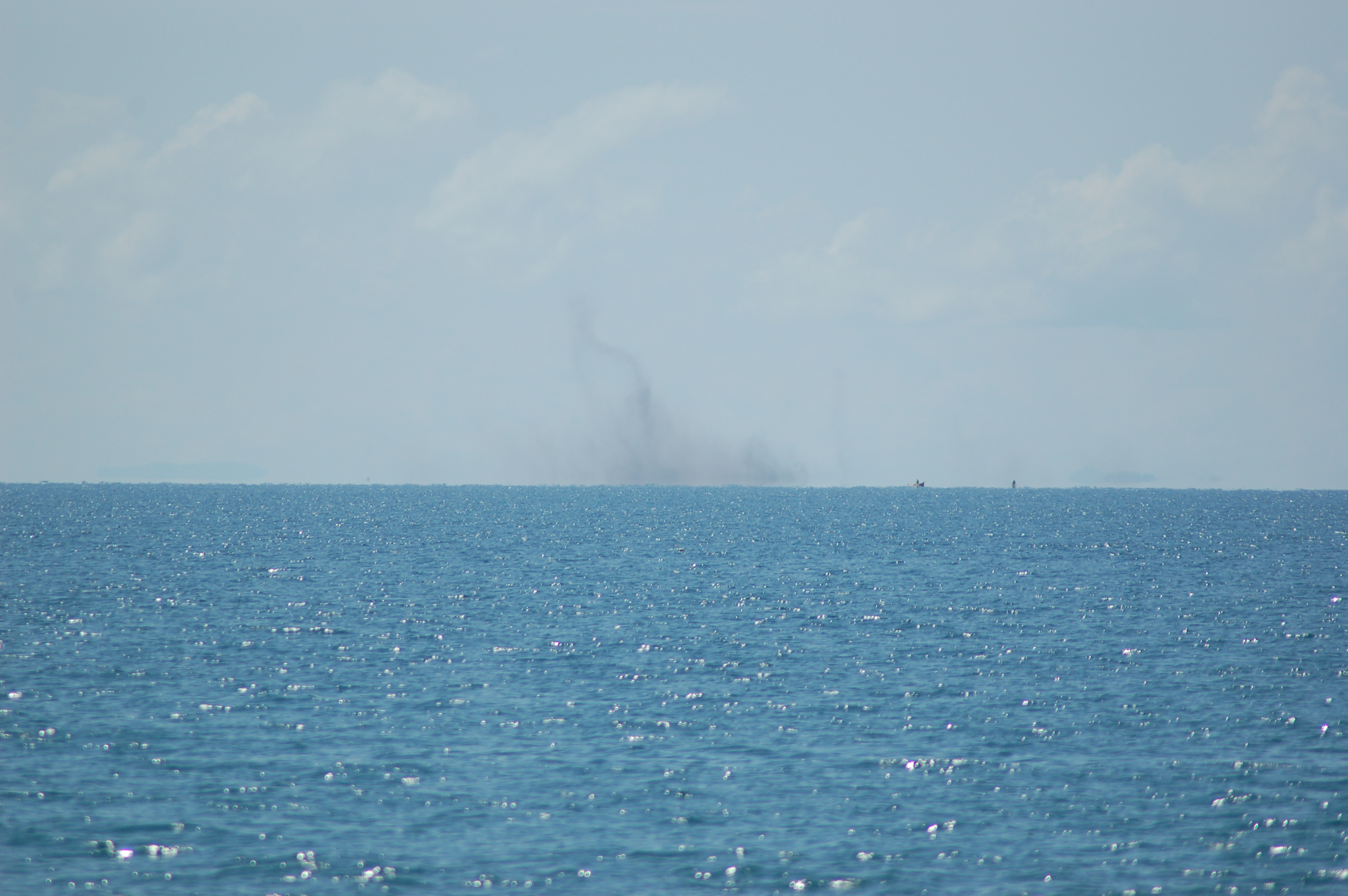
Huge swarms of Chaoborus edulis, resembling distant plumes of smoke, over Lake Malawi's water

May Berenbaum, an American entomologist, discusses how swarms of midges can cause significant problems for local populations. She cites an example of swarms of Chaoborus edulis, a species of midge, forming near Lake Malawi and how the local people turn them into kunga cakes as a "rich source of protein", which is eaten "with great enthusiasm". To catch the flies, a frying pan can be coated in cooking oil and then wafted through a swarm.

In Insects: An Edible Field Guide, a book on the consumption of insects, author Stefan Gates suggests that people can "make burgers with it, or dry it out and grate parts of it off into stews" for "umami richness". Adventurer Bear Grylls calls kunga cake "a great survival food". Explorer David Livingstone claimed that they "tasted not unlike caviar".

== Description ==
Kunga cake is made from adult Chaoborus, which are small flying insects commonly found near freshwater lakes. These insects can gather in large numbers around lakes. At lakes in Eastern Africa, at specifics Moon phases, some insects come out in massive swarms. These swarms allow local communities to collect the insects for food. Kunga cake has a very dark appearance, with a flavor reminiscent of caviar or salted locusts. The insects are pressed together, giving the cake its compact form.

== Cultural significance ==
Kunga cake is part of the traditional food culture of communities in East Africa, especially those living near Lake Malawi. In some East African communities, these insects have traditionally been collected and eaten. Natives of Malawi create Kunga, a liquid-like mixture containing insects similar to mosquitoes. This mixture is traditionally processed into cakes that can be dried and eaten.

== Preparation ==
Locals of Lake Malawi are the main consumers of Kunga cakes, compressed masses of grown Chaoborus, which can be found in swarms near the lake.Large groups of Chaoborus are collected when they appear near freshwater lakes. Chaoborus harvesting usually happens during swarming.“Local communities collect flying insects using frying pans coated with cooking oil. The insects stick to the oil making it easy to collect. The harvested insects can be compressed into small masses after boiling. These masses are shaped into cakes and may be dried for later consumption.

== Taste and nutrition ==
Opinions regarding the flavor profile of Kunga cake vary. It could be form into burger like patties or dried and grated into stews for an umami flavor with a slight resemblance to caviar. The dehydrated Chaoborus insects have high protein content. Research discussed in The Food Insects Newsletter reported that flour made from dried insects collected near Lake Victoria contained approximately 67 grams of protein per 100 grams. However, this measurement refers to dried insect flour rather than finished Kunga cakes.
