= Mochlonyx =

Scientific classification
- Kingdom: Animalia
- Phylum: Arthropoda
- Class: Insecta
- Order: Diptera
- Family: Chaoboridae
- Genus: Mochlonyx; Loew, 1844

Genus of flies

Mochlonyx is a genus of flies belonging to the family Chaoboridae.

The species of this genus are found in Europe and Northern America.

Species:

- Mochlonyx cinctipes (Coquillett, 1903)
- Mochlonyx fuliginosus (Felt, 1905)
