= Kairomone =

Chemical communication between species that benefits the recipient but not the emitter

A kairomone is a semiochemical released by an organism that mediates interspecific interactions in a way that benefits a different species at the expense of the emitter. Derived from the Greek καιρός, meaning "opportune moment", it serves as a form of "eavesdropping", enabling the receiver to gain an advantage, such as locating food or evading predators, even if it poses a risk to the emitter. Unlike allomones, which benefit the producer at the receiver's cost, or synomones, which are mutually beneficial, kairomones favor only the recipient. Primarily studied in entomology, kairomones can play key roles in predator-prey dynamics, mate attraction, and even applications in pest control.

== Predator detection and prey localization ==
An example of this can be found in the Ponderosa Pine tree (Pinus ponderosa), which produces a terpene called myrcene when it is damaged by the Western pine beetle. Instead of deterring the insect, it acts synergistically with aggregation pheromones which in turn act to lure more beetles to the tree.

Specialist predatory beetles find bark beetles (their prey) using the pheromones the bark beetles produce. In this case the chemical substance produced is both a pheromone (communication between bark beetles) and a kairomone (eavesdropping). This was discovered accidentally when the predatory beetles and other enemies were attracted to insect traps baited with bark beetle pheromones.

Pheromones of different kinds may be exploited as kairomones by receivers. The German wasp, Vespula germanica, is attracted to a pheromone produced by male Mediterranean fruit flies (Ceratitis capitata) when the males gather for a mating display, causing the death of some. In contrast, it is the alarm pheromone (used to communicate the presence of a threat) of an ant (Iridomyrmex purpureus) that a spider predator is attracted to.

Uric acid, a kairomone type excreted by birds and reptiles.

Birds and reptiles secrete uric acid, a metabolite that can be considered a kairomone. This compound can be used by the lone star tick (Amblyomma americanum) to locate its hosts. Instead of being attracted to the source, the tick's response is arrestment, ensuring it remains in areas where hosts are likely to pass. Furthermore, A. americanum responds strongly to excreta from fed ticks, suggesting it uses multiple signals to identify promising feeding locations. Unlike A. americanum, the tick Dermacentor variabilis, which prefers mammalian hosts, does not respond to uric acid.

== Prey responses to predatory cues ==
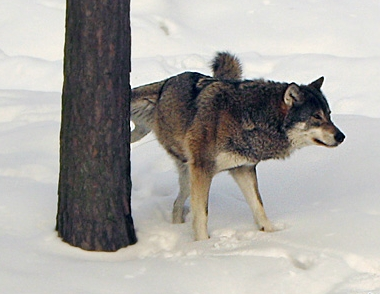
Wolves produce kairomones when scent-marking their territories

Some prey make use of chemicals originating from predators, using these cues as an indicator of the level of predation risk and changing their morphology if need be. Changes in morphology caused by predator presence is known as predator-induced polyphenism, and occurs across a variety of animals. For example, Daphnia cucullata show formation of "helmets" when exposed to predators or the water they have lived in. Their predators include cladocerans (such as Leptodora kindtii) and larvae of Chaoborus flavicans, a midge. They respond to these kairomones by doubling the size of their helmets, a protective structure. These changes in morphology make them safer from predators.

Mice are instinctively afraid of the smell of their natural predators, including cats and rats, even if they have been isolated from predators for hundreds of generations. When the chemical cues responsible for the fear response were purified from cat saliva and rat urine, two homologous protein signals were identified: Fel d 4 (Felis domesticus allergen 4), the product of the cat Mup gene, and Rat n 1 (Rattus norvegicus allergen 1), the product of the rat Mup13 gene. Mice are fearful of these major urinary proteins (Mups) even when they are produced in bacteria, while mutant animals that are unable to detect the Mups show no fear of rats, demonstrating their importance in triggering fear responses. It is not known exactly how Mups from different species initiate disparate behaviours, but mouse Mups and predator Mups have been shown to activate unique patterns of sensory neurons in the nose of recipient mice. This implies the mouse perceives them differently, via distinct neural circuits. The pheromone receptors responsible for Mup detection are also unknown, though they are thought be members of the V2R receptor class.

The urine of canids, such as wolves, contains sulfur-bearing pyrazine analogues that have been identified as kairomones. These interspecific chemical signals alert potential prey to the presence of a predator, eliciting avoidance and freezing behaviors in species such as mice, deer, and cattle. Other carnivores, such as coyotes, may detect wolf kairomones and avoid areas marked with wolf urine.

== Role in mate attraction ==
Kairomones are also used by some animals to identify the location of viable mates. For example, by feeding on vascular plants, female Melolontha melolontha stimulate the release of green leaf volatiles (GLVs). These kairomones mix with the females' own pheromones, enhancing their ability to attract males of the species.

== Applications ==
Like pheromones (communication chemicals used within a species), kairomones can be utilized as an 'attracticide' to lure a pest species to a location containing pesticide. However, they might also be used to lure desired species. Kairomones produced by the hosts of parasitic wasps have been used in an attempt to attract them and keep them around in crops where they reduce herbivory, but this could instead result in fewer attacks on the herbivorous pest if the applied kairomone distracts them from finding real hosts. For example, studies have shown that kairomones are effective in attracting female African sugarcane borers to deposit eggs on dead leaf material.

Recent discoveries have highlighted that predators are attracted to the odour of co-existing predators.

Kairomones have been extensively studied, and some are in successful usage, in Florida's Anastrepha suspensa eradication zone in support of the citrus, and various other orchard industries there.

== See also ==
- Chemical ecology
- Ecology of fear
- Major urinary proteins
- Polyphenism
- Push–pull technology
