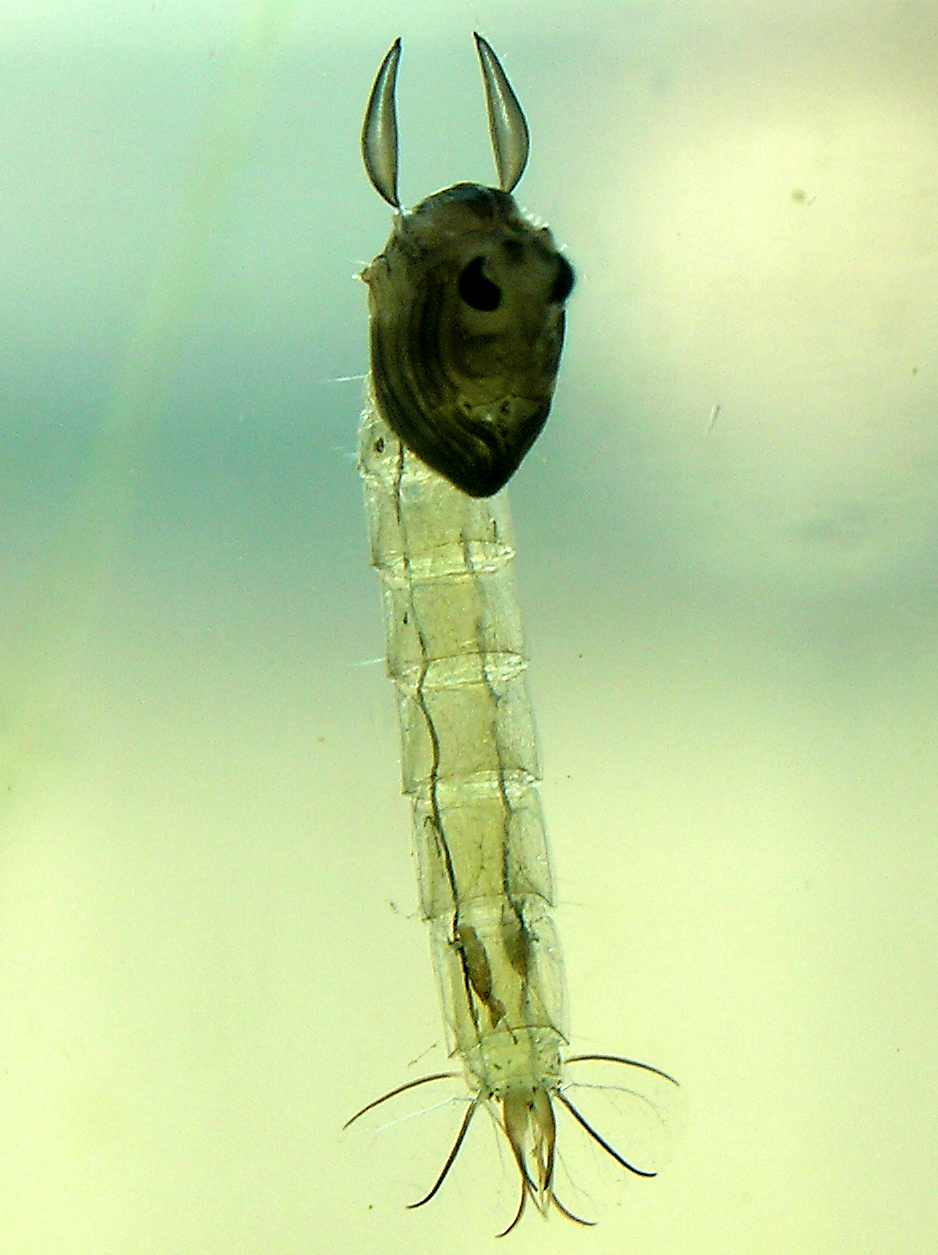
- Chaoborus pupa

Scientific classification
- Kingdom: Animalia
- Phylum: Arthropoda
- Clade: Pancrustacea
- Class: Insecta
- Order: Diptera
- Superfamily: Culicoidea
- Family: Chaoboridae; Edwards, 1932

Subfamilies
- Chaoborinae; Eucorethrinae

= Chaoboridae =

Chaoboridae Temporal range: Triassic–Recent

Family of flies

Chaoboridae, commonly known as phantom midges or glassworms, is a family of fairly common midges with a cosmopolitan distribution. They are closely related to the Corethrellidae and Chironomidae, and adults can be distinguished by specific features of their wing venation. The family includes approximately 55 aquatic species distributed across about six genera.

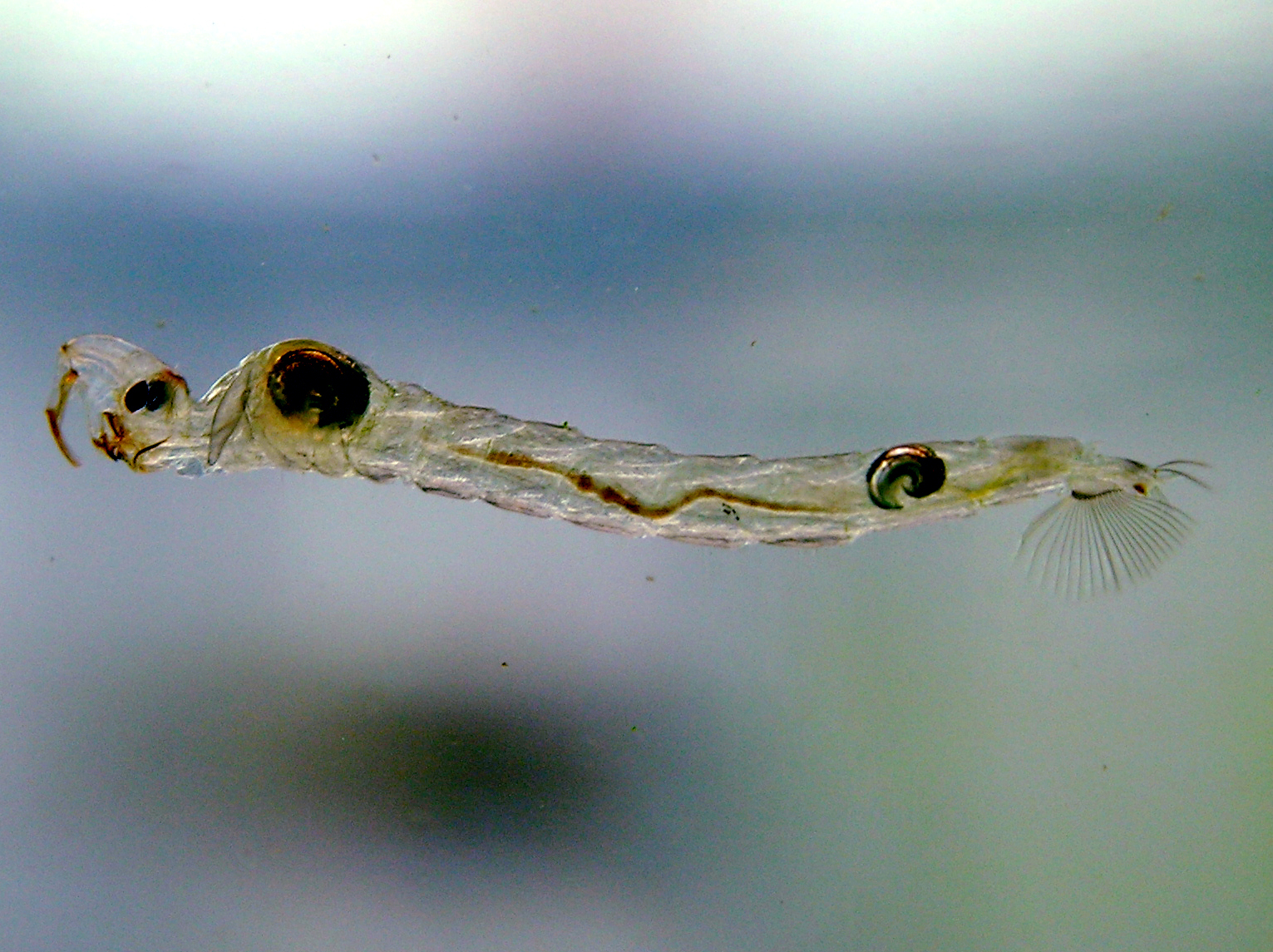
Larva of a species of Chaoborus. Note the raptorial antennae

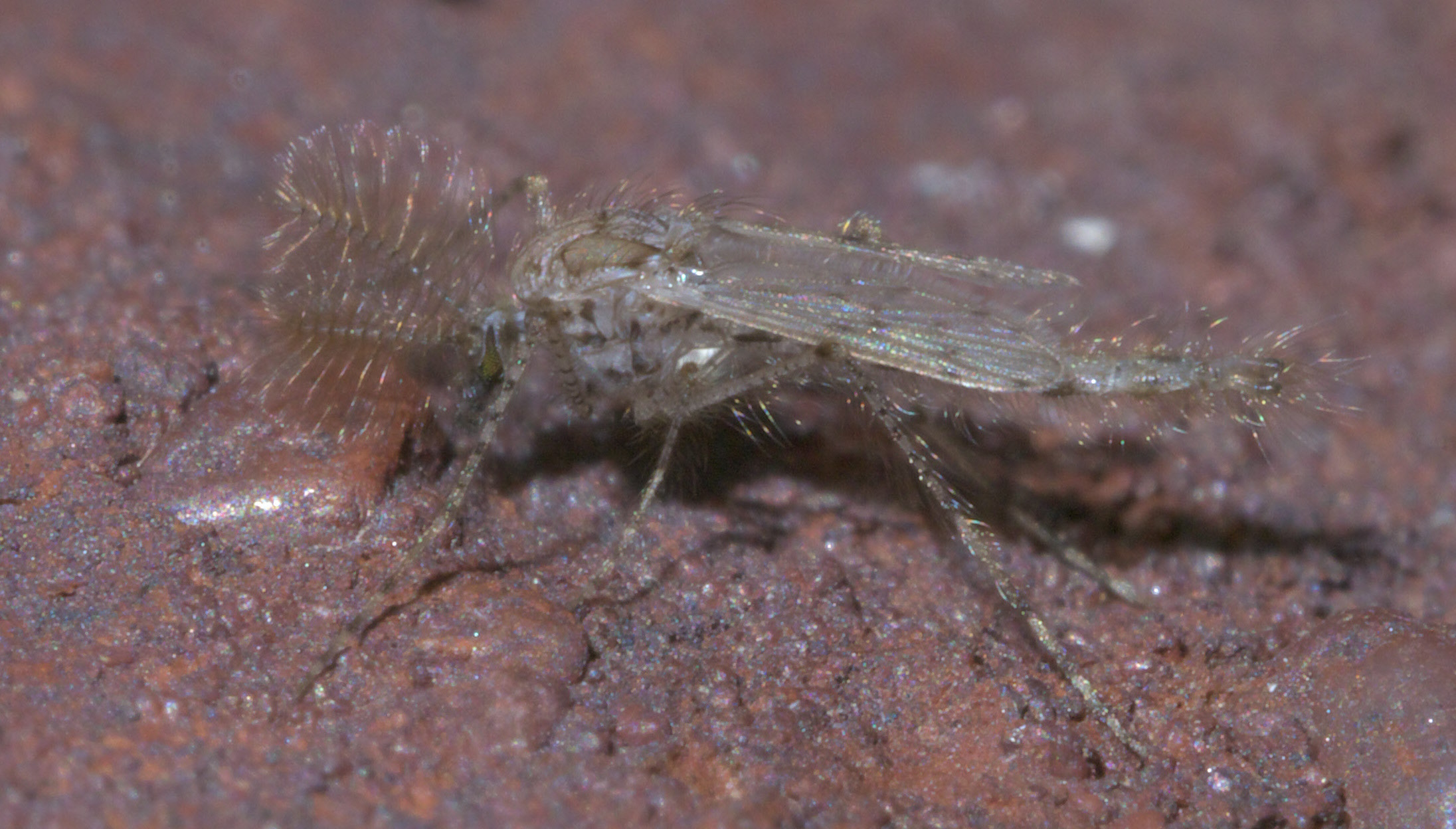
Chaoborus punctipennis

Adult phantom midges, if they feed at all, primarily consume nectar. The larvae are aquatic and notable for their unique feeding strategy: the antennae are modified into grasping organs, somewhat resembling the raptorial arms of a mantis, which they use to capture prey. They primarily feed on small insects, such as mosquito larvae, and crustaceans, including Daphnia. The antennae impale or crush the prey before bringing it to the larval mouth, or stylet.

Larvae swim actively and sometimes form large swarms in their lacustrine habitats.

== Description ==
The larvae are nearly transparent, sometimes with a slightly yellow cast; their most opaque features are two air bags, one in the thorax, one in the abdomen about in the second last segment. The adults are delicate flies that closely resemble Chironomidae. Their antennae are 15-segmented and the females' antennae are somewhat bristly; the males' antennae, in contrast, are very plumose. In this respect, too, they resemble many of the Nematocera, and in particular the Chironomidae. The species vary in size from about 2 mm to 10 mm long in their adult stages.

== Genera ==
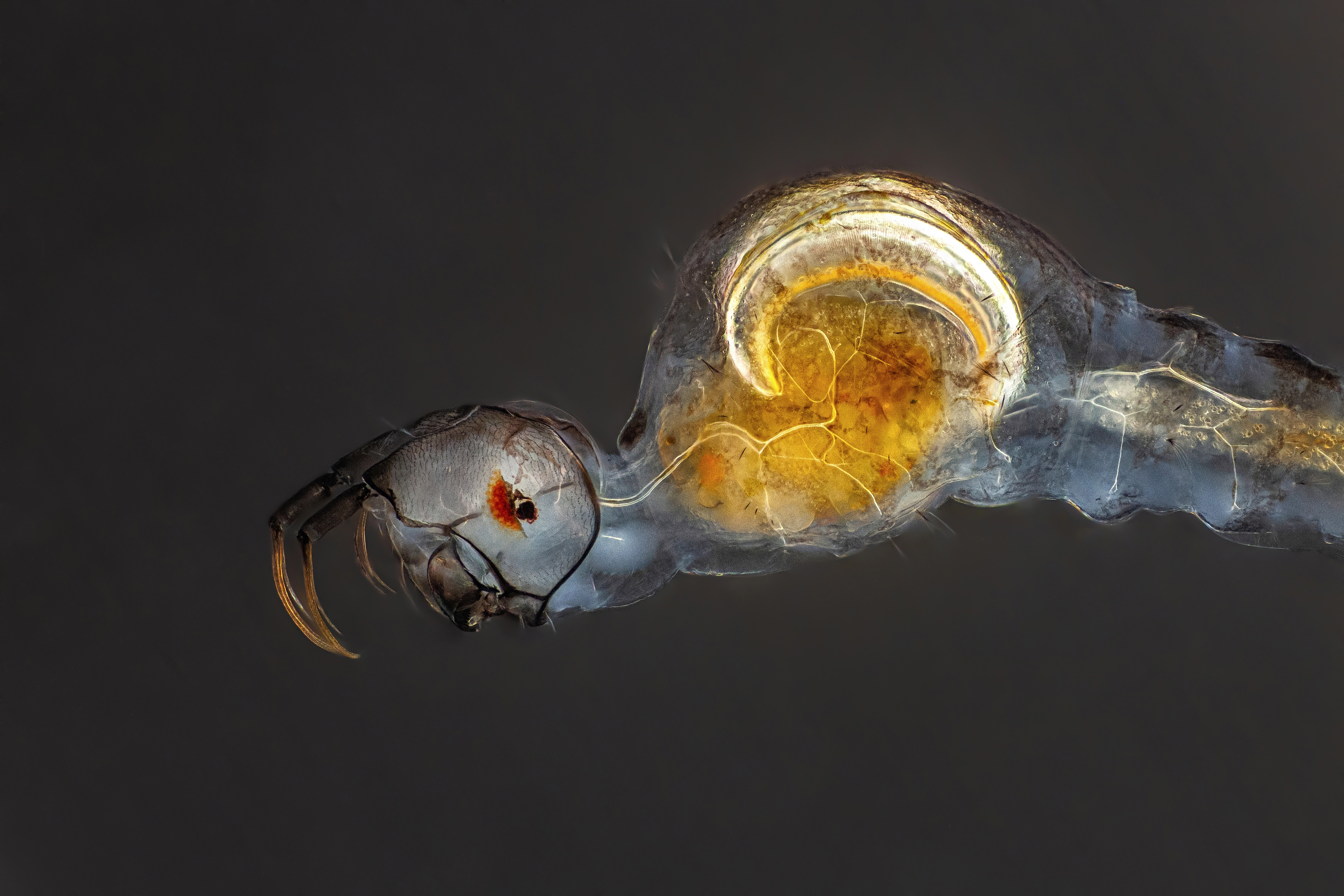
Chaoboridae larva

There are about 90 species in the family Chaoboridae in about 17 extant and 11 extinct genera.

The oldest fossil of the family dates to the Triassic.

- Astrocorethra Kalugina, 1986
- Australomochlonyx Freeman, 1962
- Chaoborites Kalugina 1985
- Chaoborus Lichtenstein, 1800
- Chironomaptera Ping, 1928
- Cryophila Edwards, 1930
- Culicites
- Eucorethra Underwood, 1903
- Eucorethrina Kalugina, 1985
- Helokrenia Kalugina, 1985
- Hypsocorethra Kalugina, 1985
- Mesochaoborus Zhang, Zhang, Liu & Shangguan, 1986
- Mochlonyx Loew, 1844
- Palaeomochlonyx Seredszus & Wichard, 2009
- Peusomyia Sæther, 1970
- Praechaoborus Kalugina, 1985
- Promochlonyx Edwards, 1930
- † Baleiomyia Kalugina, 1993
- † Chachotosha Lukashevich, 1996
- † Chaoburmus Lukashevich, 2000
- † Dixamima Rohdendorf, 1951
- † Gedanoborus Szadziewski & Gilłka, 2007
- † Jordanobotomus Kaddumi, 2005
- † Libanoculex Azar, Nel, Huang & Engel, 2023
- † Mesocorethra Kalugina, 1993
- † Rhaetomyia Rohdendorf, 1962
- † Taimyborus Lukashevich, 1999
- † Triassomyia Lukashevich, 2022 Madygen Formation, Kyrgyzstan Middle-Late Triassic
