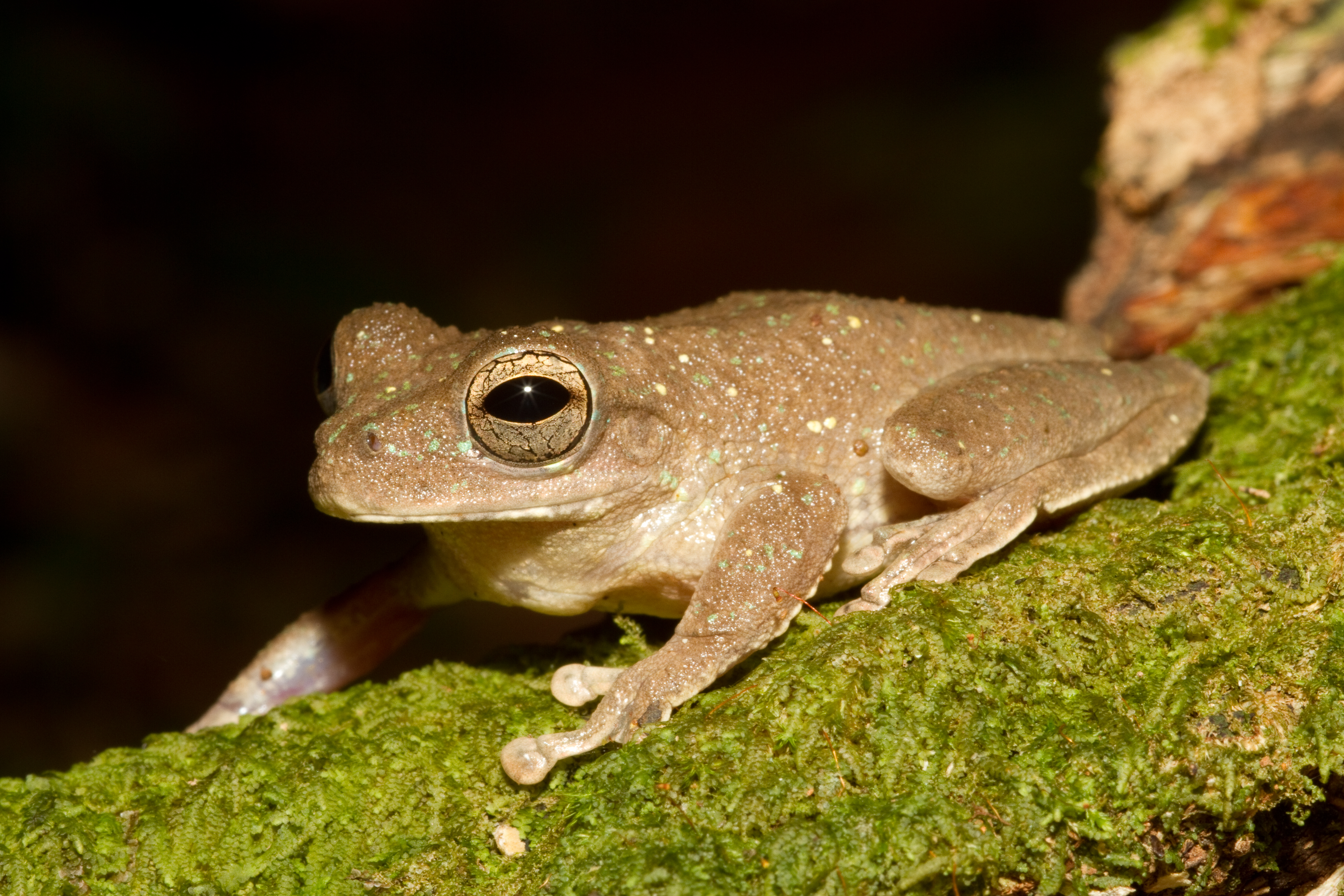

Conservation status
- Least Concern (IUCN 3.1)

Scientific classification
- Kingdom: Animalia
- Phylum: Chordata
- Class: Amphibia
- Order: Anura
- Family: Hylidae
- Genus: Smilisca
- Species: S. sila

Binomial name
- Smilisca sila Duellman & Trueb, 1966

Synonyms
- Hyla sila (Duellman & Trueb, 1966)

= Panama cross-banded tree frog =

Species of amphibian

The Panama cross-banded tree frog or pug-nosed tree frog (Smilisca sila) is a species of frog in the family Hylidae found in the humid Pacific lowlands of southwestern Costa Rica to eastern Panama and in the Caribbean lowlands of Panama and northern Colombia. Males of the species utilize synchronous calling to hide their position from predators. Females create basins during amplexus and deposit fertilized eggs onto the surface of the water.

== Description ==
Males grow to 45 mm (1.8 in) and females to 62 mm (2.4 in) in snout–vent length. They are gray, tan or reddish brown in dorsal colouration, with tuberculate skin. White or green flecks as well as darker blotches and markings may be present. Ventral surface is creamy white. The males possess a grey, paired vocal sac used to participate in their characteristic choruses, while the females have a singular white vocal sac flecked with brown. The underside of the thighs and groin are brown with blue spots, while the underside of the arm has yellow spots. The irises of the frog's eyes are brown with a black netted pattern. Toes are webbed on front and back legs with large pads at the tip. Adult S. sila individuals are morphologically very similar to their sister species S. sordida, but possess a flatter snout and bumpier skin. Tadpoles are relatively round, with weak muscles and broad, short tails adapted for small ponds. They possess mouthparts used for scraping and chewing.

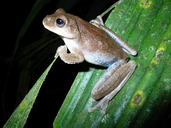

== Habitat and distribution ==
S. sila is found in the lowlands of southwest Costa Rica, Panama, and Northern Colombia and prefers transitional zones between wet and dry lowland tropical forests close to shallow rocky pools and stream banks. It can also occur in secondary forest, and sometimes in relatively open areas. These frogs are found between the elevations of 10–970 m. They breed during the dry season from January to April at low elevations and may breed during the rainy season at high elevations. S. sila females prefer gravel islands or banks alongside first-order streams for breeding and laying eggs. Males of the species tend to call alongside streams with ambient noise and overhanging vegetation to mask calls from predators and hide if needed. Tadpoles live in clear pools and slow-moving water near the bottom.

== Conservation ==
This species is currently listed as Least Concern by the IUCN Red List and was last assessed in 2019. Although they are listed as Least Concern, Panama cross-banded tree frogs are still threatened by common hazards to amphibian species such as habitat loss caused by agriculture, illegal crops, pollution, pesticides, logging, and human settlement. The species occurs in many protected areas, such as the Parque Nacional Carara in Costa Rica and Barro Colorado Island in Panama.

== Population structure, speciation, and phylogeny ==
=== Close relatives and hybridization ===
The closest relatives of S. sila are the other Smilisca species, S. baudinii, S. manisorum, S. phaeota, S. puma, and S. sordida. The Smilisca clade as a whole consists of the Anotheca, Diaglena, Smilisca, and Triprion genera, and is weakly related to the Hyla and Isthmohyla clades.

The basin construction reproductive model of S. sila is shared with the closely related species Smilisca sordida and is a synapomorphy character for the two species. It is not found in the other Smilisca species.

Interspecific amplexus has been observed between male S. sila and male Strabomantis bufoniformis on a female S. bufoniformis as well as between a male S. sila and Craugastor fitzingeri individual. These events may show a potential lack of selectivity by S. sila males.

== Behaviour ==
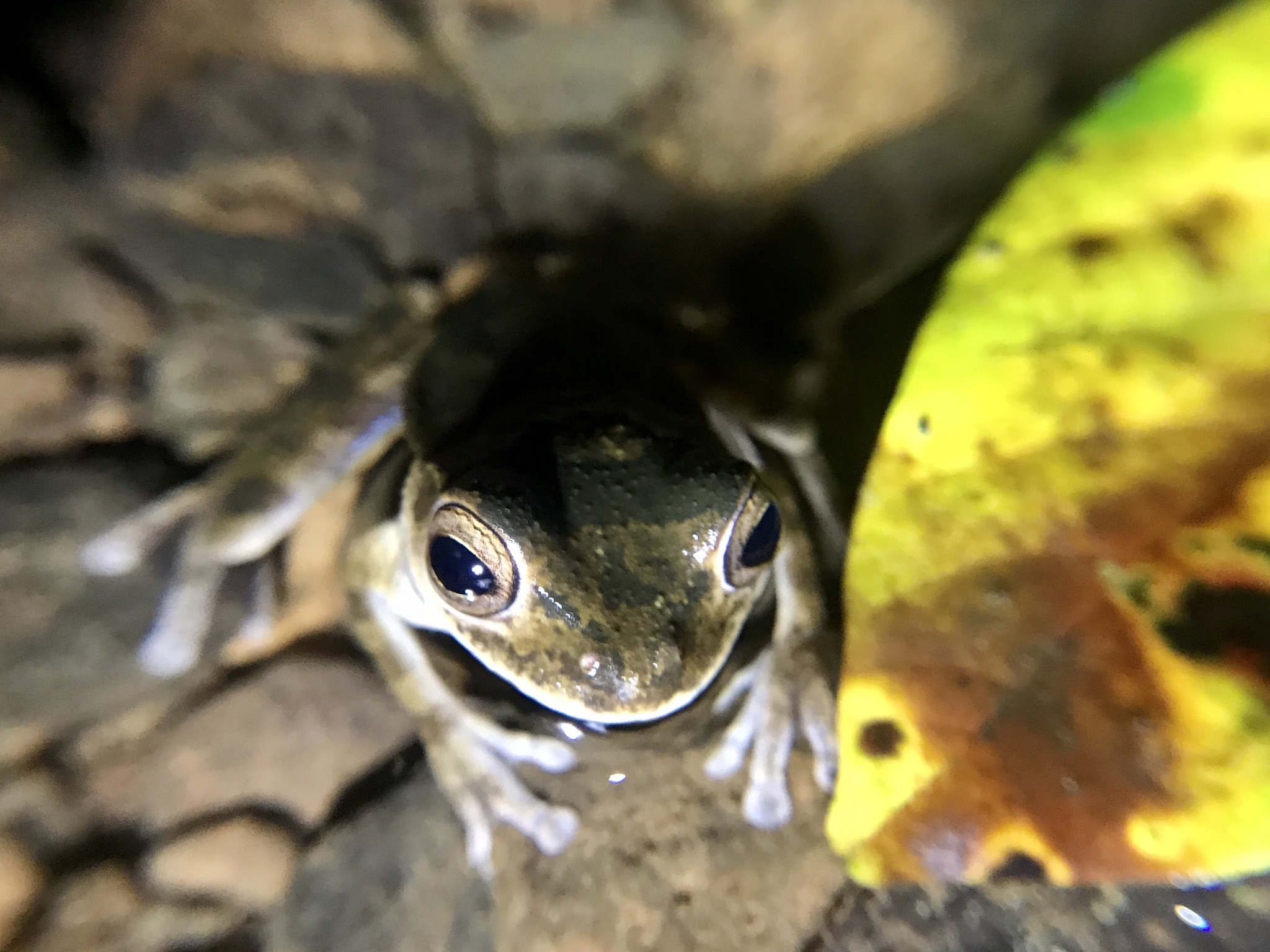
Smilisca sila on leaf litter

=== Diet ===
S. sila tadpoles possess scraping mouthparts and are substrate feeders of algae and plant matter within their ponds. Although S. sila breeds during the dry season, periods of rain may connect small ponds and allow the tadpoles to travel between them, expanding their access to food resources.

=== Acoustic crypsis ===
==== Environment ====
The most common form of communication among anuran species is acoustic communication. This means that the main way for S. sila males to attract and communicate with females is through advertisement calling. However, predators of the species such as the frog-eating bat (Trachops cirrhosus) and frog-biting midges (Corethrella spp.) also utilize male S. sila advertisement calls to locate individuals to hunt or parasitize. This creates a trade-off between mating success and a greater rate of predation for an individual. This trade-off has influenced when and how males choose to call. Male S. sila tend to call more frequently, utilize more complex calls, and have a longer total calling period on moonlit nights compared to moonless nights as they are better able to visually detect predators when the night is relatively bright. On dark, moonless nights males tend to hide within overhanging vegetation and perform shorter, simple calls at a lower frequency.

==== Synchronous chorus ====
Males also exhibit a rare almost-perfect synchronicity in their calling; most anuran species use alternating signals to advertise themselves to potential mates. These synchronous choruses create an auditory illusion where potential predators are biased towards the first call of the chorus and perceive all following calls as from the same location as the leading call. This allows for acoustic crypsis by all following males, hiding their location from predators. All of this seems to also lower the ability of males to attract a female to their location, but female S. sila show no preference for the first caller and may also utilize this illusion to choose hidden males and lower their own likelihood of being caught by a predator. In fact, relaxed sexual selection by females is what allowed for the evolution of this strategy. Females also show no preference between synchronous or non-synchronous calls of S. sila males.

== Mating and Reproduction ==
=== Mate calling ===
Panama cross-banded tree frogs are nocturnal. Breeding takes place during the dry season when males call from the edges of forest streams. S. sila males utilize variable complex calls to attract females influenced by factors such as predator presence, other males, ambient noise of surroundings, and relative darkness of the night. The advertisement calls of S. sila, calls produced during breeding season for the purpose of attracting mates, fall under Guild H of the proposed guild classification system for anuran calls. These calls are complex and modulated by frequency, composed of at least two structurally distinct notes and a significant change in dominant frequency throughout the call. Guild H represents only 2.3% of the 1,253 anuran species categorized, making it relatively rare. The dominant frequency of S. sila calls is 1915 Hz. Single notes of the male S. sila advertisement call last for approximately 0.16 seconds and calls may have as many as four notes. A male of the species averages 1.7 calls per minute. Males do not aggregate alongside streams, and instead are evenly spaced.

Anuran species tend to have specialized morphology and biochemical functions that allow them to control the acoustic frequency and oscillations of their calls. Common morphological features of calling anuran species are highly developed trunk muscles, vocal sacs, and tympanic membranes. Calling is a very energetically expensive behavior and as such may explain why choruses and songs are relatively short in duration.

=== Amplexus and egg laying ===
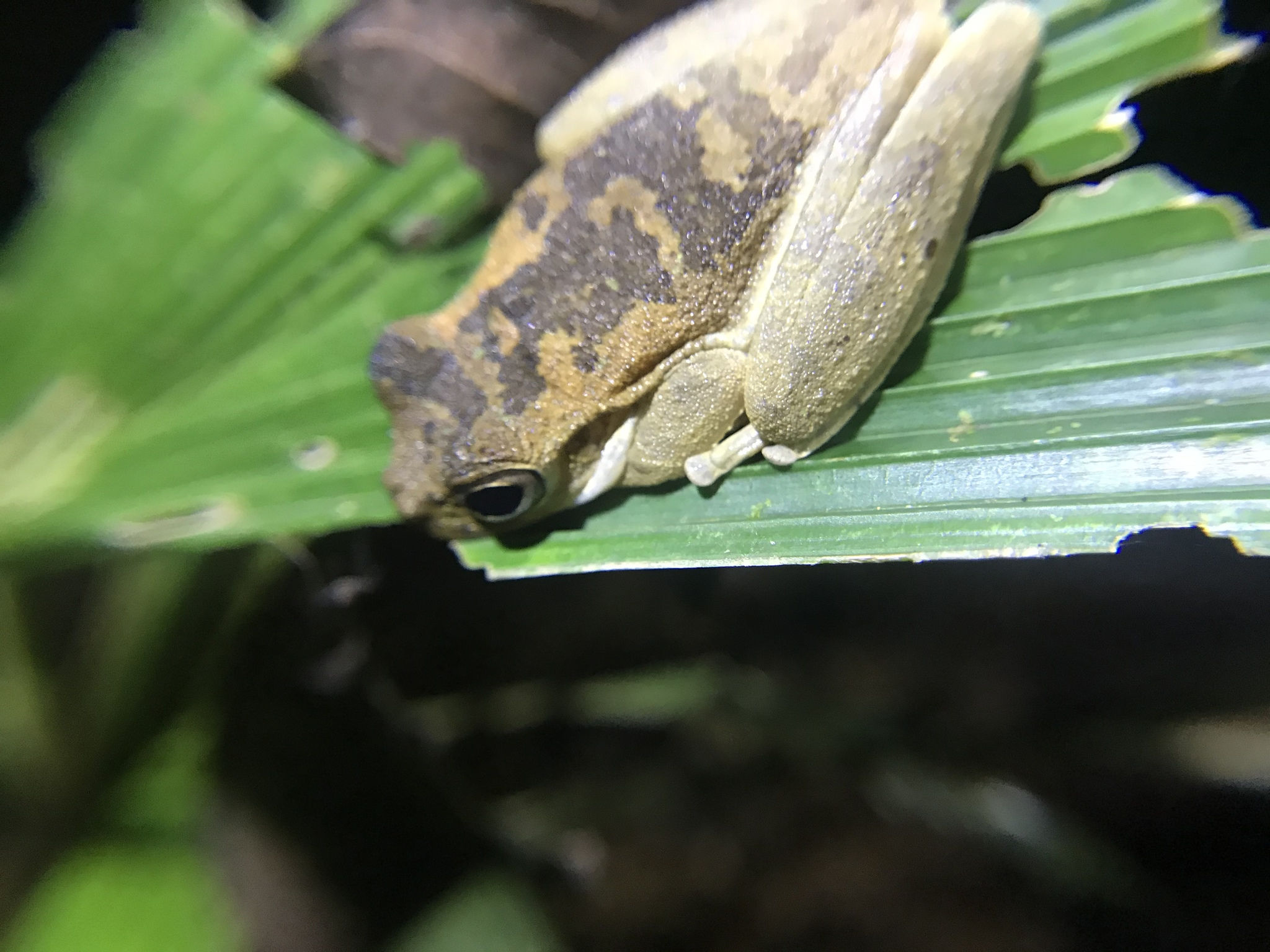
Smilisca sila on leaf

S. sila females create singular basins on gravel islands within streams or alongside the riverbanks. These basins are formed during amplexus; as the male holds onto the female, the female uses her hind legs to scrape out a water-filled open depression over a period of around 40 to 160 minutes. After basin construction the female arches her dorsum out of the water of the basin, lays her eggs which are fertilized by the male, and finally lowers her dorsum back into the water. The small, black, fertilized eggs slide off the female's back and float within the basin. Basin construction reproductive models are rare within frogs, only occurring within 15 of over 5100 species of anurans. Basin construction during amplexus by the female is especially rare and is expressed only by S. sila and the species' close relative S. sordida. All other Smilisca species deposit their eggs into standing water as a film that floats upon the surface.

The basin construction reproductive model is a synapomorphy characteristic for S. sila and S. sordida, although S. sila only displays a single basin reproductive model (the open basin) while S. sordida displays two, the open basin and buried basin where eggs are buried beneath the substrate. Open basins may provide higher temperatures relative to that of the stream (potentially allowing for faster growth of young) as well as safety from aquatic predators such as fish. However, the basin model is still susceptible to the negative impacts of parasites such as planarians, predation from tadpoles (of other species or of same species), desiccation, and flooding. Success of basin eggs is influenced by spatial distribution of predators and time of oviposition.

== Environmental stressors ==
=== Predators ===
S. sila is commonly preyed upon by Trachops cirrhosus, the frog-eating bat, and Corethrella spp. known as frog-biting midges. T. cirrhosus flies along streams and catches frogs that it hears calling alongside the river. After being caught, the frog is eaten whole. Frog-biting midges consume the blood of the frogs and can potentially transmit blood parasites. Both species use the advertisement calls of male S. sila to locate their prey. T. cirrhosus is better able to locate frogs that use asynchronous, complex calls away from ambient noise that may mask location, and both T. cirrhosus and the frog-biting midges show preference for the leading calls of synchronous choruses. S. sila uses visual cues to locate these predators and utilizes acoustic crypsis to hide their location as the males call.

=== Parasites ===
S. sila adults are vulnerable to blood parasites transferred via frog-biting midges. S. sila eggs and tadpoles are vulnerable to aquatic parasites such as planarians and Girardia sp. which can penetrate the gel capsule and eat the eggs.

Another groups of midges that parasitize S. sila are Corethrella spp., which have a broad acoustic template allowing them to follow the mating calls of a variety of frog species, including those of S. sila. Their broad acoustic template also allows them to overcome the difficulty of host detection and localization and facilitate their shift between hosts, increasing their survival rate. The increased survival rate of the parasite increases the threat to the host S. sila.
