= Mexican tree frog =

Mexican tree frog may refer to:

- Dwarf Mexican tree frog (Tlalocohyla smithii), a frog in the family Hylidae endemic to Mexico
- Mexican burrowing tree frog (Smilisca), a genus of frogs in the family Hylidae found in the Americas
- Common Mexican tree frog (Smilisca baudinii), a species of frog found from southern California to Costa Rica
