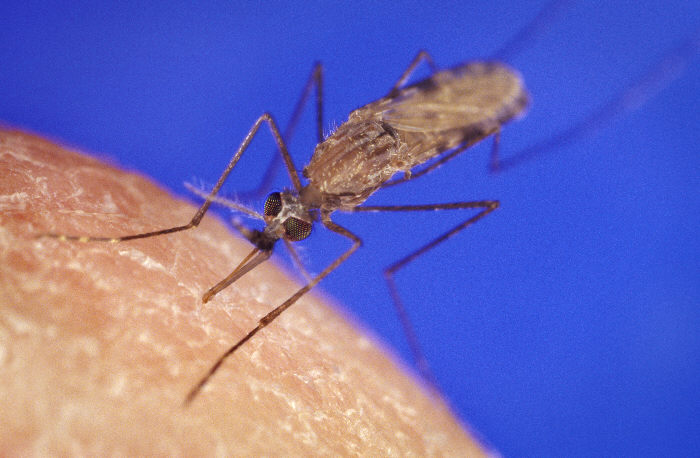

Scientific classification
- Kingdom: Animalia
- Phylum: Arthropoda
- Clade: Pancrustacea
- Class: Insecta
- Order: Diptera
- Suborder: Nematocera
- Infraorder: Culicomorpha; Hennig, 1948

Superfamilies
- Culicoidea; Chironomoidea; See text for families.

= Culicomorpha =

Infraorder of flies

The Culicomorpha are an infraorder of Nematocera, including mosquitoes, black flies, and several extant and extinct families of insects. They originated 176 million years ago, in the Early Jurassic period. There are phylogenetic patterns that are used to interpret bionomic features such as differences in the nature of blood-feeding by adult females, daytime or nighttime feeding by adult females, and occurrence of immature stages in aquatic habitats.

Most adult females lay their eggs on bodies of water. Some are restricted to very clean waters, but others can tolerate highly polluted environments.

Many adults transmit parasites or diseases that can be debilitating or fatal to humans, such as malaria and West Nile virus. Biting midges can transmit an extensive range of pathogens of veterinary importance, including Akabane virus, bovine ephemeral fever virus, Schmallenberg virus, African horse sickness virus, epizootic haemorrhagic disease virus, and bluetongue virus.

== Classification ==
The Culicomorpha comprises eight extant families divided into two superfamilies. It was described based on phylogenetic analyses of morphological features.

- Superfamily Culicoidea
  - Chaoboridae – phantom midges
  - Corethrellidae - frog-biting midges
  - Culicidae – mosquitoes
  - Dixidae - meniscus midges
- Superfamily Chironomoidea
  - Ceratopogonidae – biting midges
  - Chironomidae – nonbiting midges
  - Simuliidae – black flies and buffalo gnats
  - Thaumaleidae – solitary midges

The monophyly of Culicomorpha and Culicoidea have been confirmed in subsequent morphological and molecular studies, but several studies have found Chironomoidea to be paraphyletic. A morphological study in 2012, using characters from all life stages (egg, larva, pupae and adult), found that Chironomidae branched first and a sister relationship between Culicoidea and a clade of Simuliidae, Ceratopogonidae and Thamaleidae. A new superfamily, Simulioidea, was proposed for the latter clade and restricted Chironomoidea to Chironomidae. A phylogenomic analysis in 2018 also found a paraphyletic Chironomoidea and a close relationship between Simuliidae and Thamaleidae, but in this study Ceratopoginidae grouped with Chironomidae. The phylogenetic trees below illustrate the different arrangements.

Traditional morphological

- Culicomorpha
  - Chironomoidea
    - Thaumaleidae
    - - Simuliidae
      - - Ceratopogonidae
        - Chironomidae
  - Culicoidea
    - Dixidae
    - - Corethrellidae
      - - Chaoboridae
        - Culicidae

Revised morphological

- Culicomorpha
  - - Chironomoidea
      Chironomidae
  - - Simulioidea
      - Ceratopogonidae
      - - Thaumaleidae
        - Simuliidae
    - Culicoidea
      - Dixidae
      - - Corethrellidae
        - - Chaoboridae
          - Culicidae

Phylogenomic

- Culicomorpha
  - - Chironomoidea
      - Chironomidae
      - Ceratopogonidae
  - - Simulioidea
      - Thaumaleidae
      - Simuliidae
    - Culicoidea
      - Dixidae
      - - Corethrellidae
        - - Chaoboridae
          - Culicidae

=== Extinct families ===
- Asiochaoboridae (Upper Jurassic)
- Architendipedidae (Upper Triassic)
- Protendipedidae (Middle Jurassic)
- Mesophantasmatidae (Middle Jurassic)
