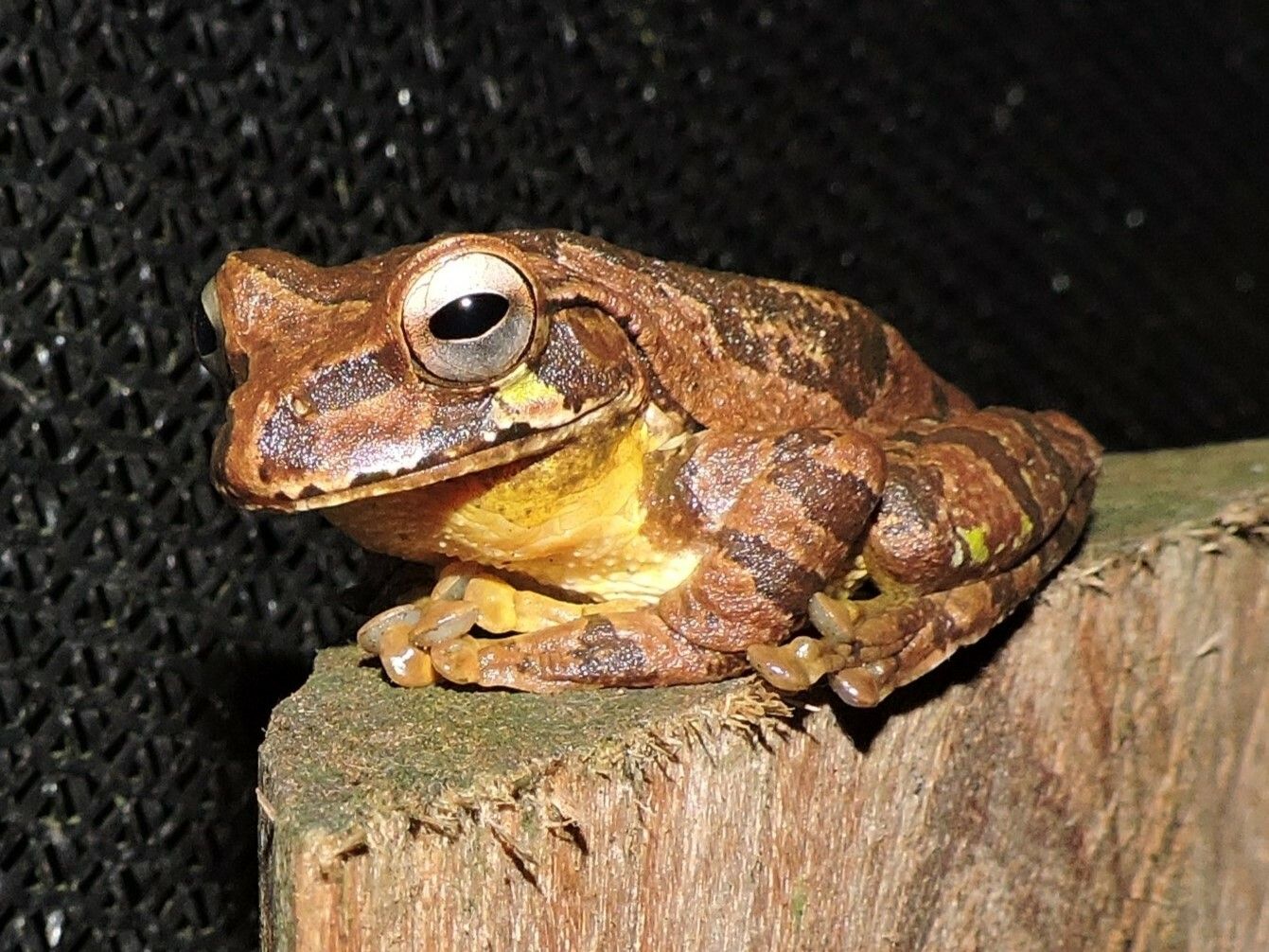

Conservation status
- Least Concern (IUCN 3.1)

Scientific classification
- Domain: Eukaryota
- Kingdom: Animalia
- Phylum: Chordata
- Class: Amphibia
- Order: Anura
- Family: Hylidae
- Genus: Smilisca
- Species: S. manisorum

Binomial name
- Smilisca manisorum (Taylor, 1954)

Synonyms
- Hyla manisorum Taylor, 1954

= Smilisca manisorum =

Species of frog

Smilisca manisorum, or the masked tree frog, is a frog in the family Hylidae, endemic to Costa Rica, Panama, Honduras and Nicaragua. It lives in coastal forests. Scientists have seen it as high as 540 meters above sea level.

The species was originally synonymized with the common Mexican tree frog (Smilisca baudinii), but was resurrected as a species in 2017.

== See also ==
- New Granada cross-banded tree frog
