= Corethrella brakeleyi =

Scientific classification
- Kingdom: Animalia
- Phylum: Arthropoda
- Clade: Pancrustacea
- Class: Insecta
- Order: Diptera
- Family: Corethrellidae
- Genus: Corethrella
- Species: C. brakeleyi

Binomial name
- Corethrella brakeleyi (Coquillett, 1902)

Synonyms
- Corethra brakeleyi Coquillett, 1902

Species of fly

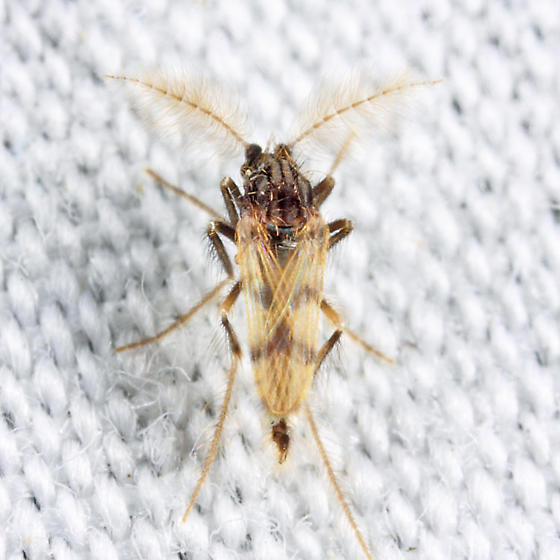
Corethrella brakeleyi

Corethrella brakeleyi is a species of frog-biting midge in the family Corethrellidae.
