= Upland burrowing tree frog =

Conservation status
- Endangered (IUCN 3.1)

Scientific classification
- Kingdom: Animalia
- Phylum: Chordata
- Class: Amphibia
- Order: Anura
- Family: Hylidae
- Genus: Smilisca
- Species: S. dentata

Binomial name
- Smilisca dentata (Smith, 1957)

Synonyms
- Pternohyla dentata Smith, 1957

Species of amphibian

The upland burrowing tree frog (Smilisca dentata) is a species of frog in the family Hylidae. It is endemic to Mexico and occurs in southeastern Aguascalientes and adjacent northern Jalisco at elevations of 1,800–1,900 m (5,900–6,200 ft) asl. Its natural habitats are flooded grasslands where it breeds in temporary and permanent pools. It is a rare species that is threatened by habitat loss caused by conversion into agricultural land and the subsequent pesticide pollution.
