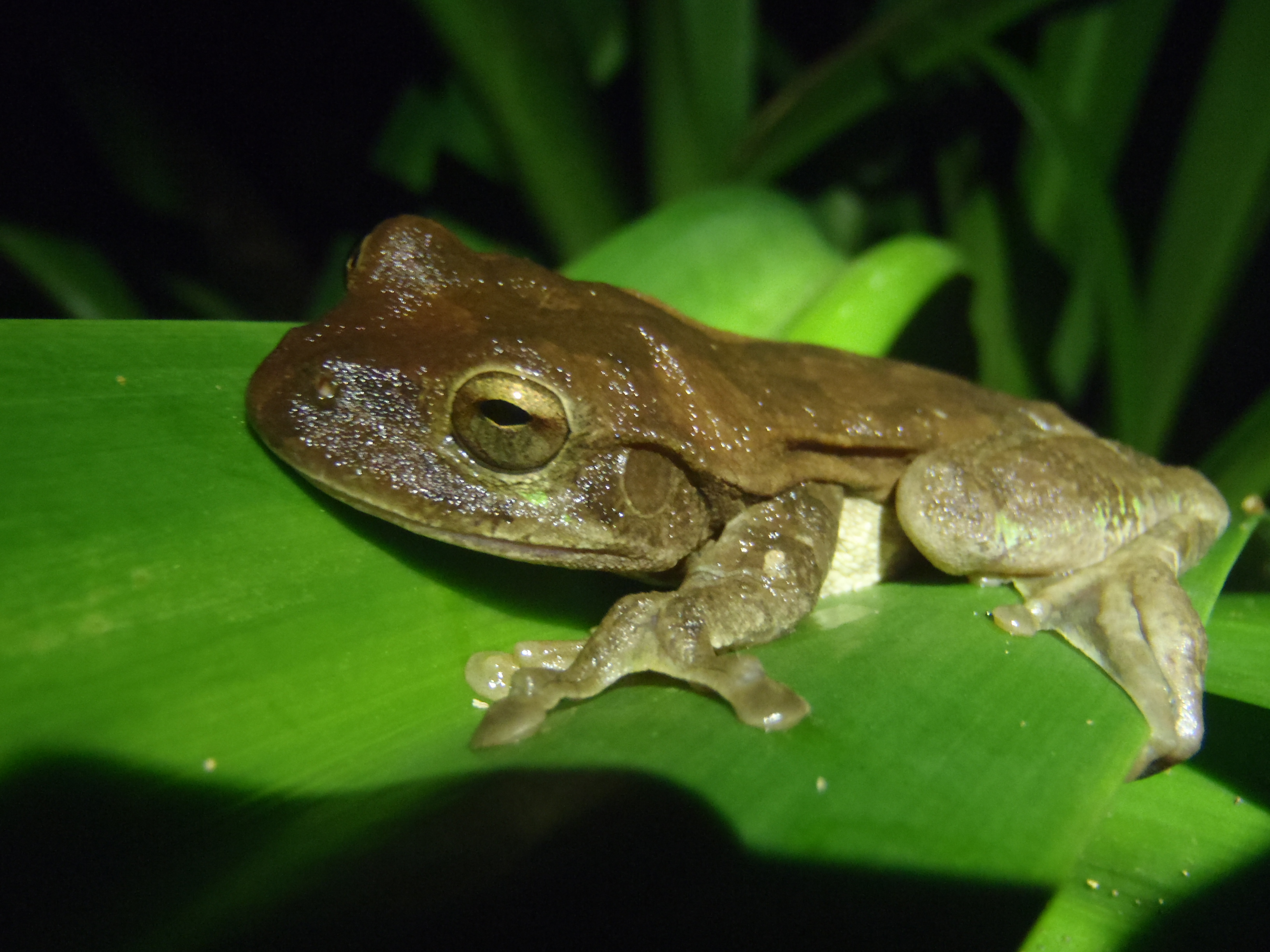

Conservation status
- Least Concern (IUCN 3.1)

Scientific classification
- Kingdom: Animalia
- Phylum: Chordata
- Class: Amphibia
- Order: Anura
- Family: Hylidae
- Genus: Smilisca
- Species: S. sordida

Binomial name
- Smilisca sordida (Peters, 1863)

= Veragua cross-banded tree frog =

Species of amphibian

The Veragua cross-banded tree frog (Smilisca sordida) is a species of frog in the family Hylidae found in Colombia, Costa Rica, Honduras, Nicaragua, and Panama. Its natural habitats are subtropical or tropical moist lowland forests, subtropical or tropical moist montane forests, rivers, plantations, rural gardens, urban areas, heavily degraded former forests, and canals and ditches. Scientists have observed it as high in the hills as 1525 meters above sea level.

The adult male frog measures 36.2 mm long in snout-vent length and the adult female frog 56.3 mm. The skin of the dorsum is gray-brown in color and the belly is lighter. It has purple skin near the groin. There are light marks over the eyes and stripes on the legs.

The tadpoles are 3.2 cm long. They live at the bottom of the stream and hold onto the rocks with their mouths.

== Phylogeny ==
The sister species of S. sordida is Smilisca sila, the Panama cross-banded tree frog. Both species utilize a basin construction reproductive model.
