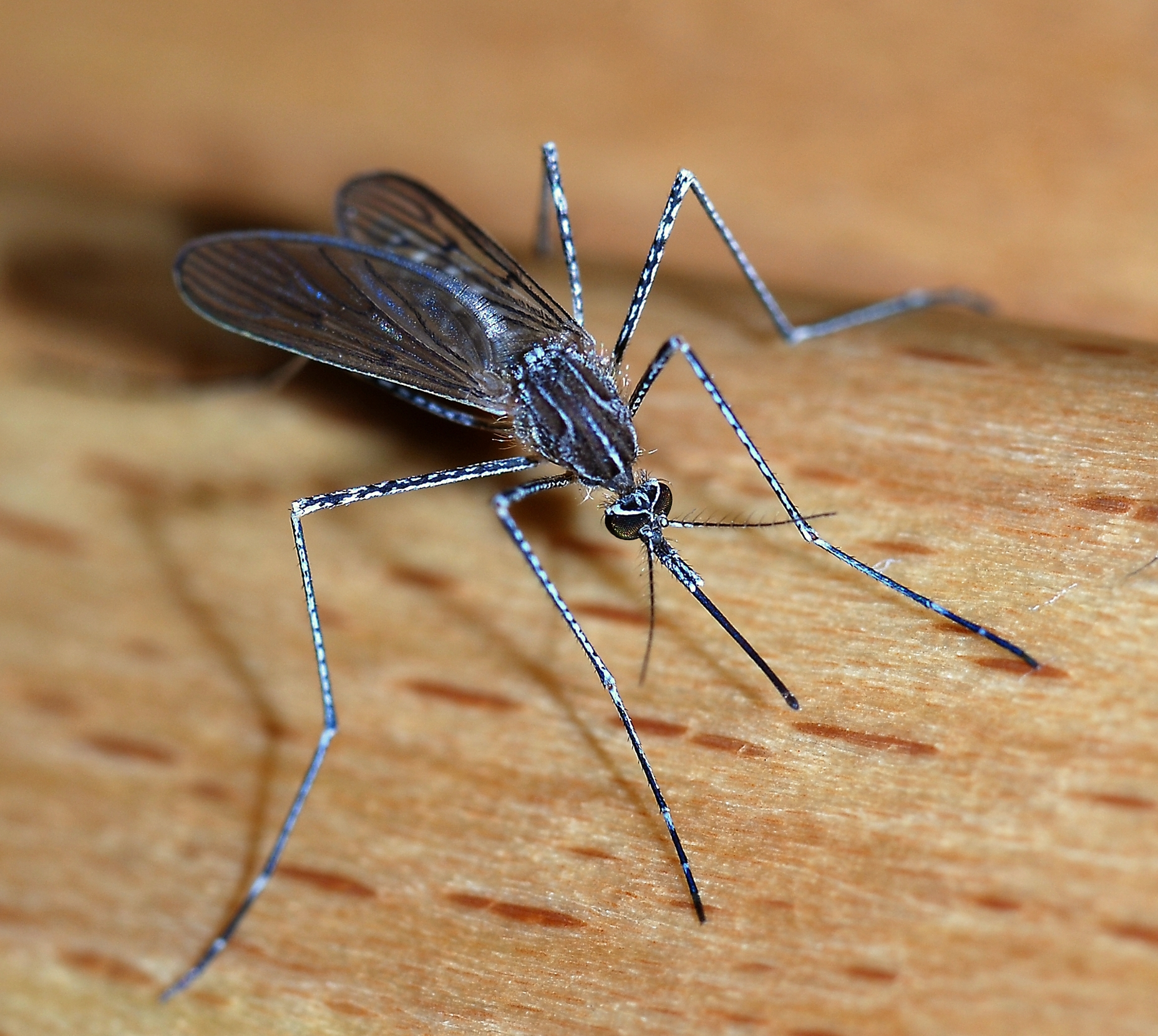
- A female Culiseta longiareolata

Scientific classification
- Kingdom: Animalia
- Phylum: Arthropoda
- Clade: Pancrustacea
- Class: Insecta
- Order: Diptera
- Suborder: Nematocera
- Infraorder: Culicomorpha
- Superfamily: Culicoidea; Malloch, 1917

Families
- Dixidae; Corethrellidae; Chaoboridae; Culicidae

= Culicoidea =

Superfamily of flies

The Culicoidea are a superfamily within the order Diptera. The following families are included within the Culicoidea:

- Dixidae – meniscus midges
- Corethrellidae – frog-biting midges
- Chaoboridae – phantom midges
- Culicidae – mosquitoes
