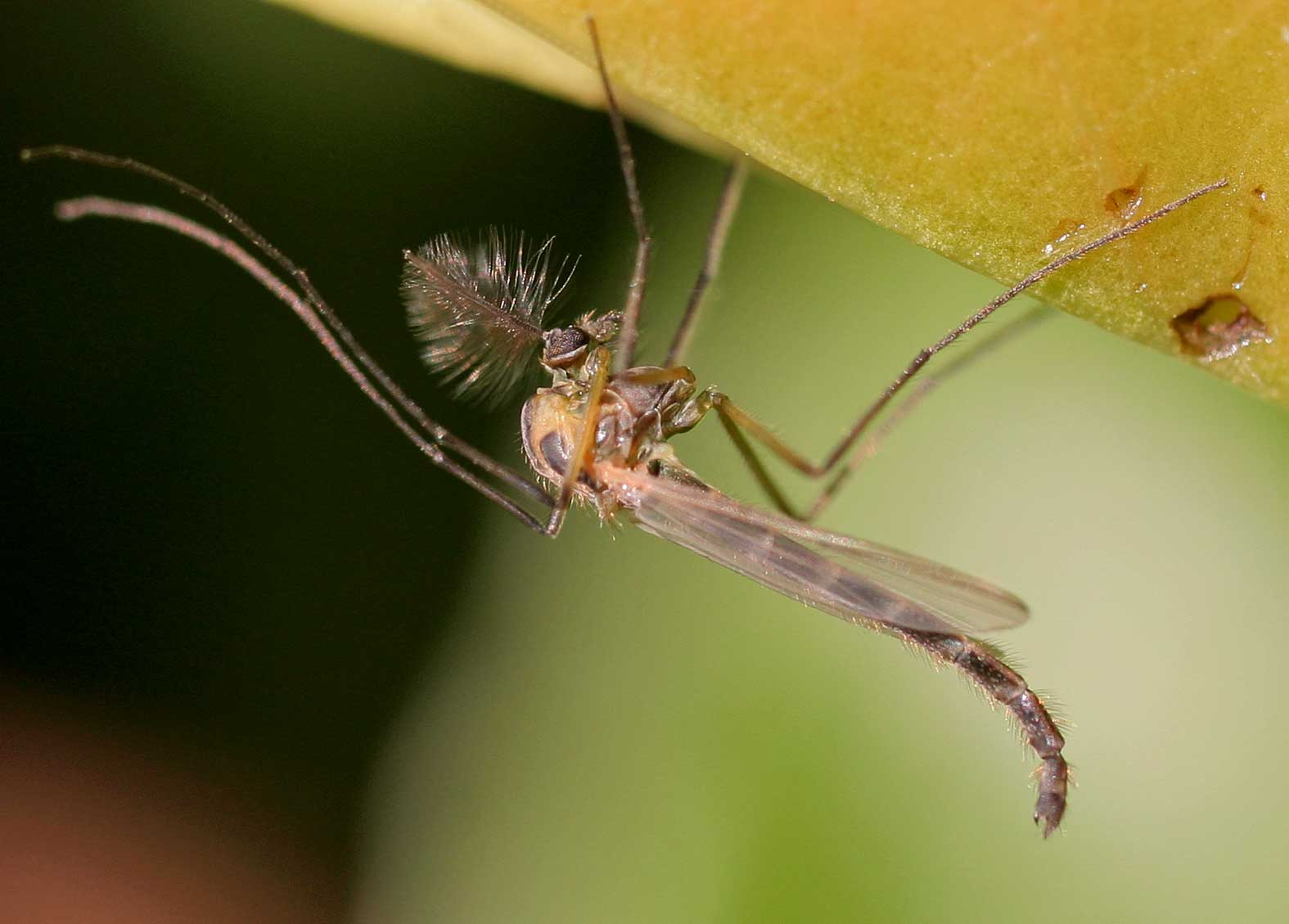
- Male Chironomus plumosus

Scientific classification
- Kingdom: Animalia
- Phylum: Arthropoda
- Clade: Pancrustacea
- Class: Insecta
- Order: Diptera
- Suborder: Nematocera
- Infraorder: Culicomorpha
- Superfamily: Chironomoidea

Families
- Chironomidae; Ceratopogonidae; Simuliidae; Thaumaleidae

= Chironomoidea =

Superfamily of flies

The Chironomoidea are a superfamily within the order Diptera, suborder Nematocera, infraorder Culicomorpha. This superfamily contains the families Chironomidae, Ceratopogonidae, Simuliidae, and Thaumaleidae.

== Description ==
Chironomoidea have four life stages: the egg, the worm-like larva, the pupa and the winged adult.

== Ecology ==
Chironomoidea show a range of habitats and diets. Using the family Chironomidae as an example, larvae occur most commonly in aquatic vegetation and benthic debris, but also in sand covered in fine organic material, pools on granite outcrops, wood snags, muddy lake beds and hygropetric seepages. Pupae may occur near the surface of water, in submerged substrata or amongst benthic debris. Larvae may feed on deposits of organic detritus (gathering collectors), filter diatoms and fine particles of detritus from the water column (filtering collectors), chew or bore into live or dead plant matter (shredders), scrape algae, bacteria and diatoms from surfaces (scrapers) or prey on other invertebrates (predators).

Adults generally feed on sugar-rich substances such as nectar. Adult females of the families Ceratopogonidae and Simuliidae also feed on blood and can transmit diseases.

== Phylogeny ==
The phylogeny of the Chironomoidea is disputed. Analyses of the male genital tract, ribosomal RNA and transcriptome have shown that the superfamily is not monophyletic.

== Evolution ==
A fossil chironomoid larva of the genus Anisinodus (family unknown) indicates that the superfamily existed during the early Middle Triassic.
