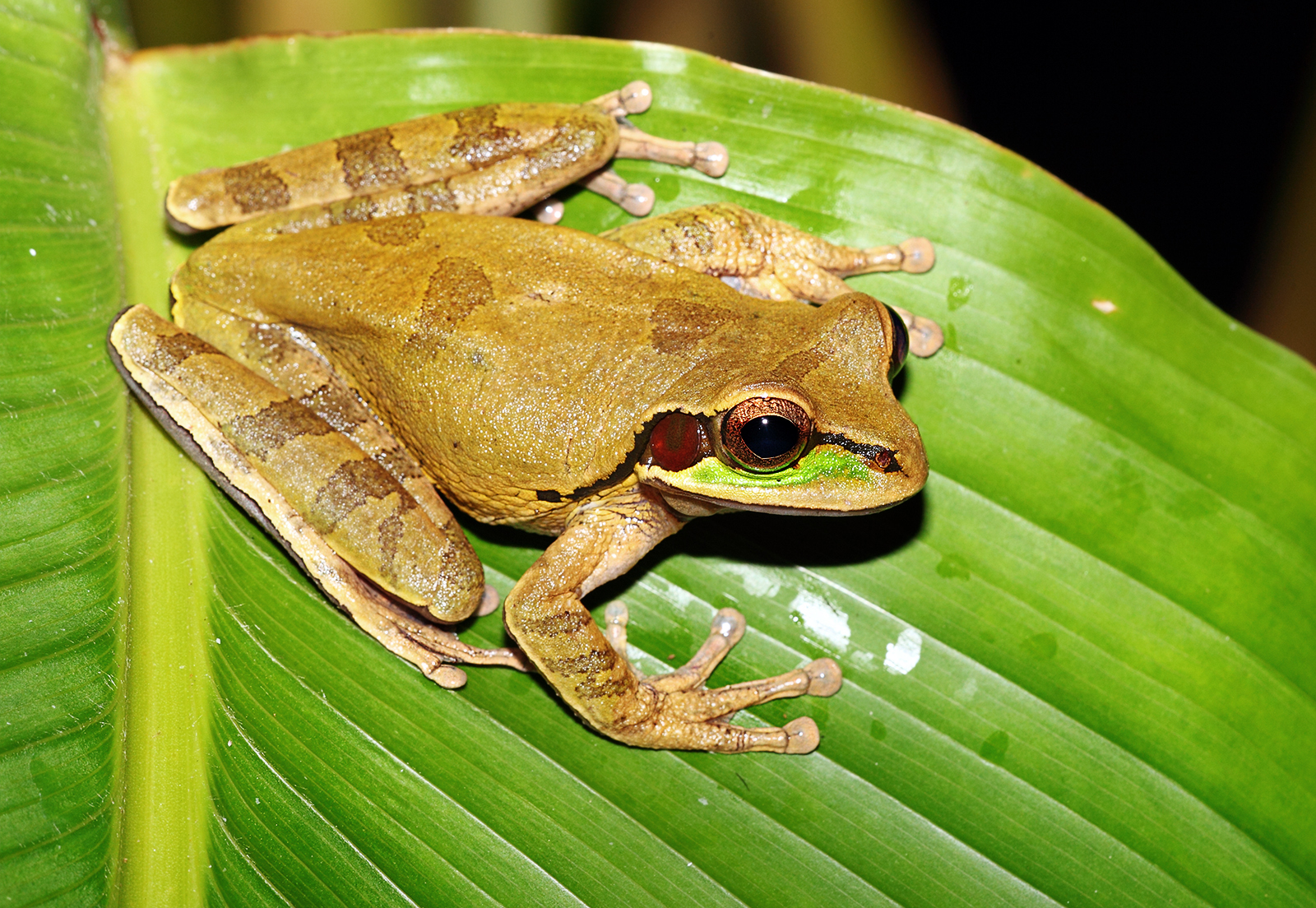
- Smilisca phaeota

Scientific classification
- Kingdom: Animalia
- Phylum: Chordata
- Class: Amphibia
- Order: Anura
- Family: Hylidae
- Subfamily: Hylinae
- Genus: Smilisca; Cope, 1865

Species
- See text

= Mexican burrowing tree frog =

Smilisca

Genus of frogs in the family Hylidae from the Americas

The Mexican burrowing tree frog (Smilisca), also known as the cross-banded tree frog, is a genus of frogs in the family Hylidae found in Mexico, southern Texas and Arizona, Central America, and northwestern South America. In a recent revision of the Hylidae, the two species of the previous genus Pternohyla were included in this genus. Its name is from the Ancient Greek smiliskos (‘little knife’), referring to the pointed frontoparietal processes.

== Species ==
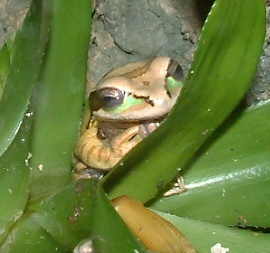
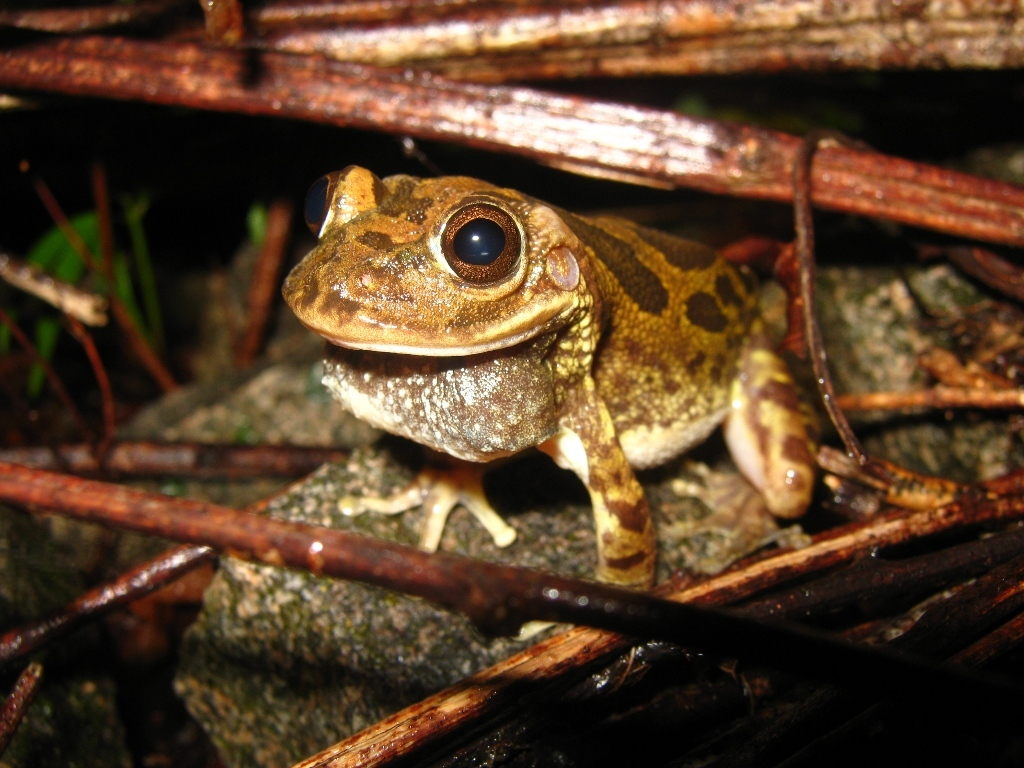
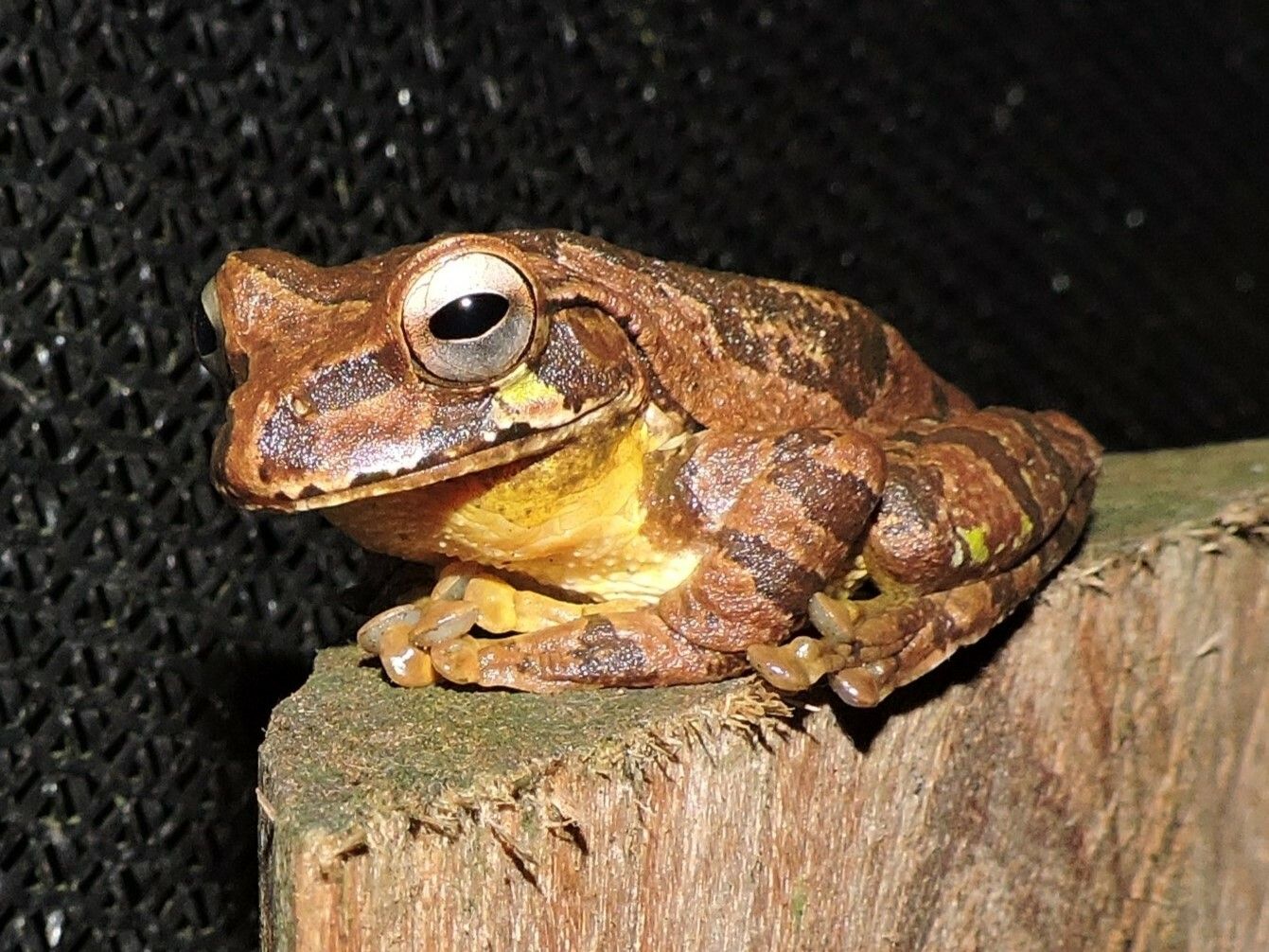
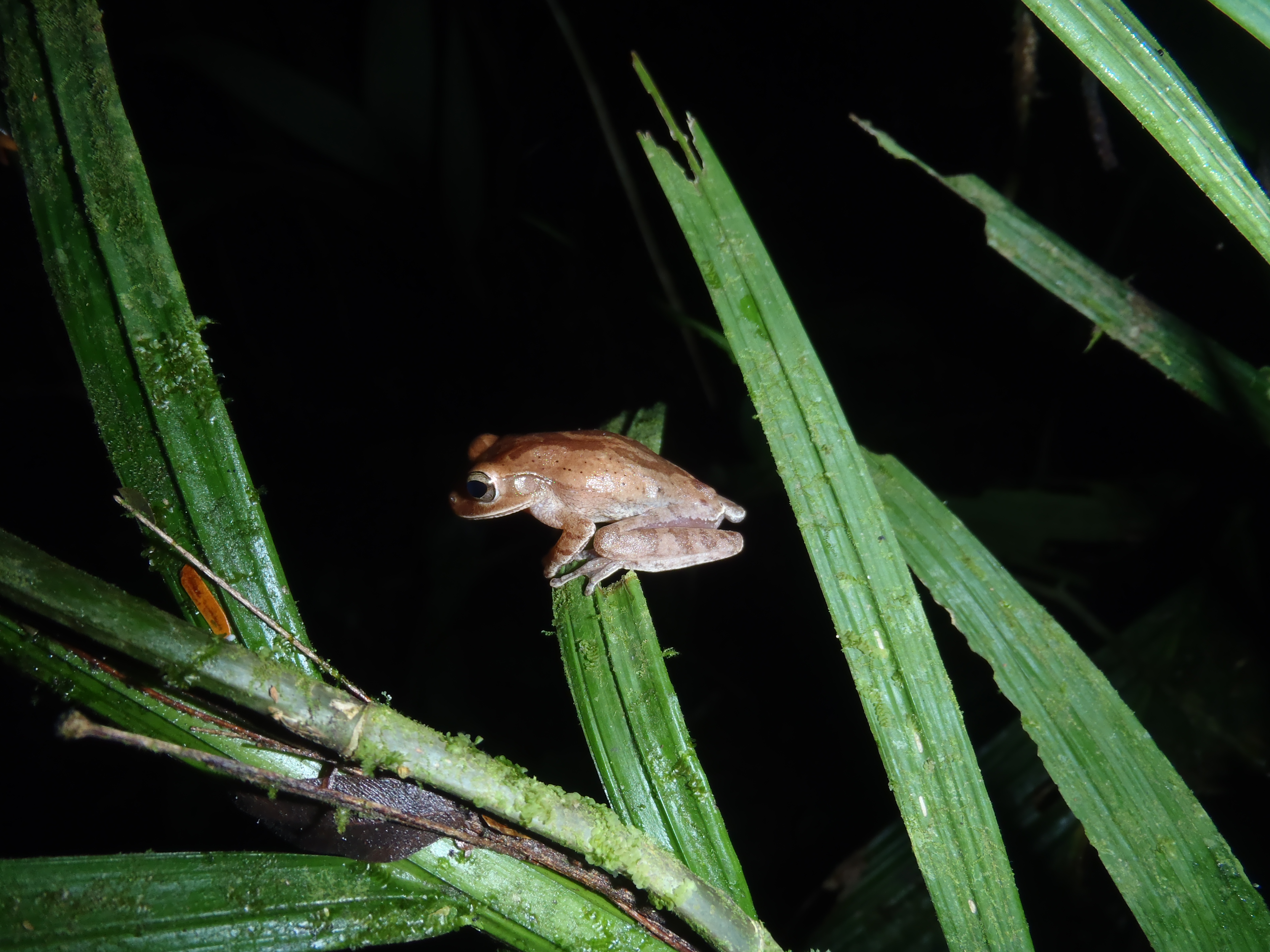
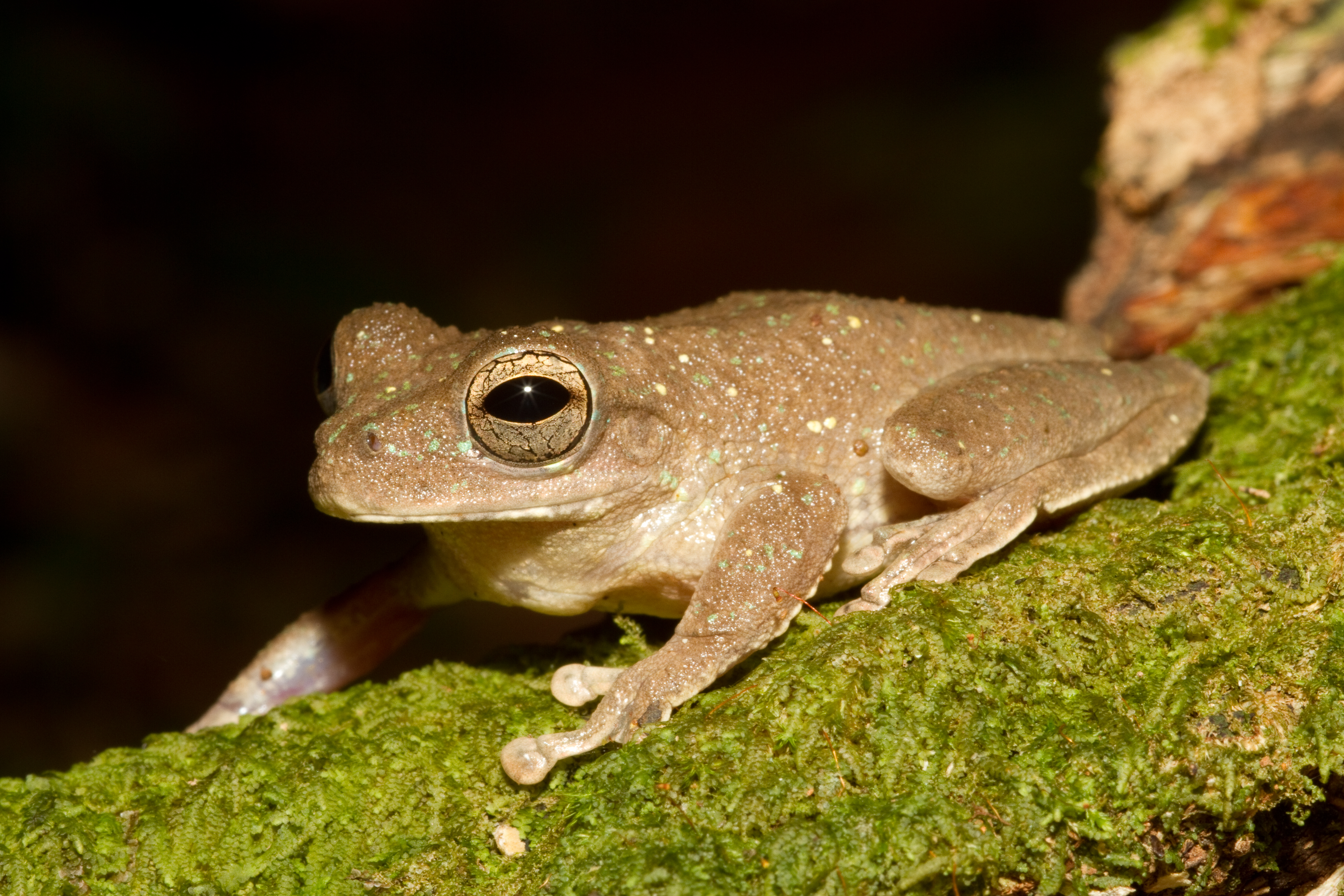
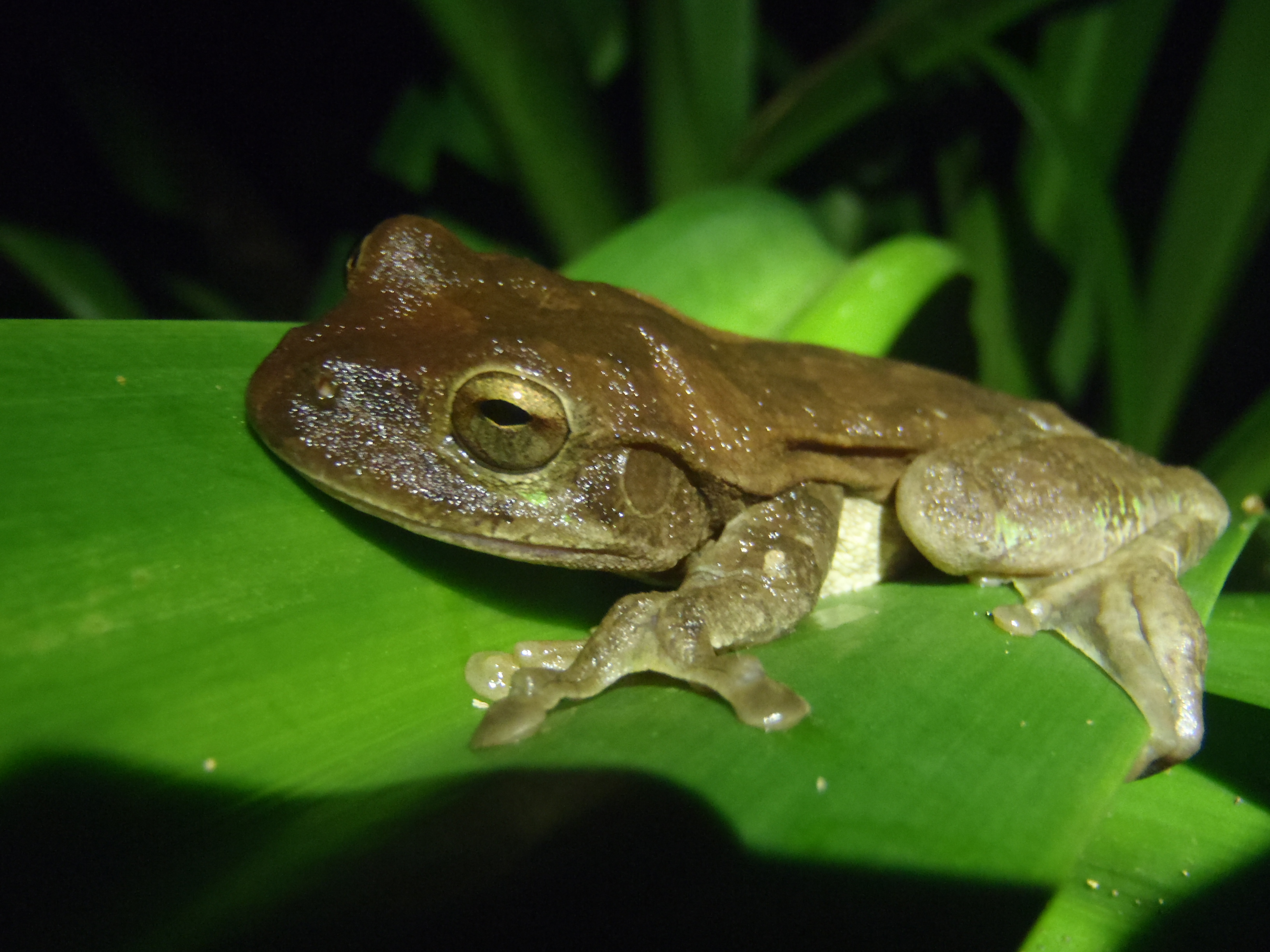
Image	Binomial name and author	Common name
	S. baudinii (Duméril and Bibron, 1841)	common Mexican tree frog
	S. cyanosticta (Smith, 1953)	blue-spotted Mexican tree frog
	S. dentata (Smith, 1957)	upland burrowing tree frog
	S. fodiens (Boulenger, 1882)	lowland burrowing tree frog
	S. manisorum (Taylor, 1954)	masked tree frog
	S. phaeota (Cope, 1862)	New Granada cross-banded tree frog or masked tree frog
	S. puma (Cope, 1885)	Nicaragua cross-banded tree frog
	S. sila Duellman and Trueb, 1966	Panama cross-banded tree frog
	S. sordida (Peters, 1863)	Veragua cross-banded tree frog
