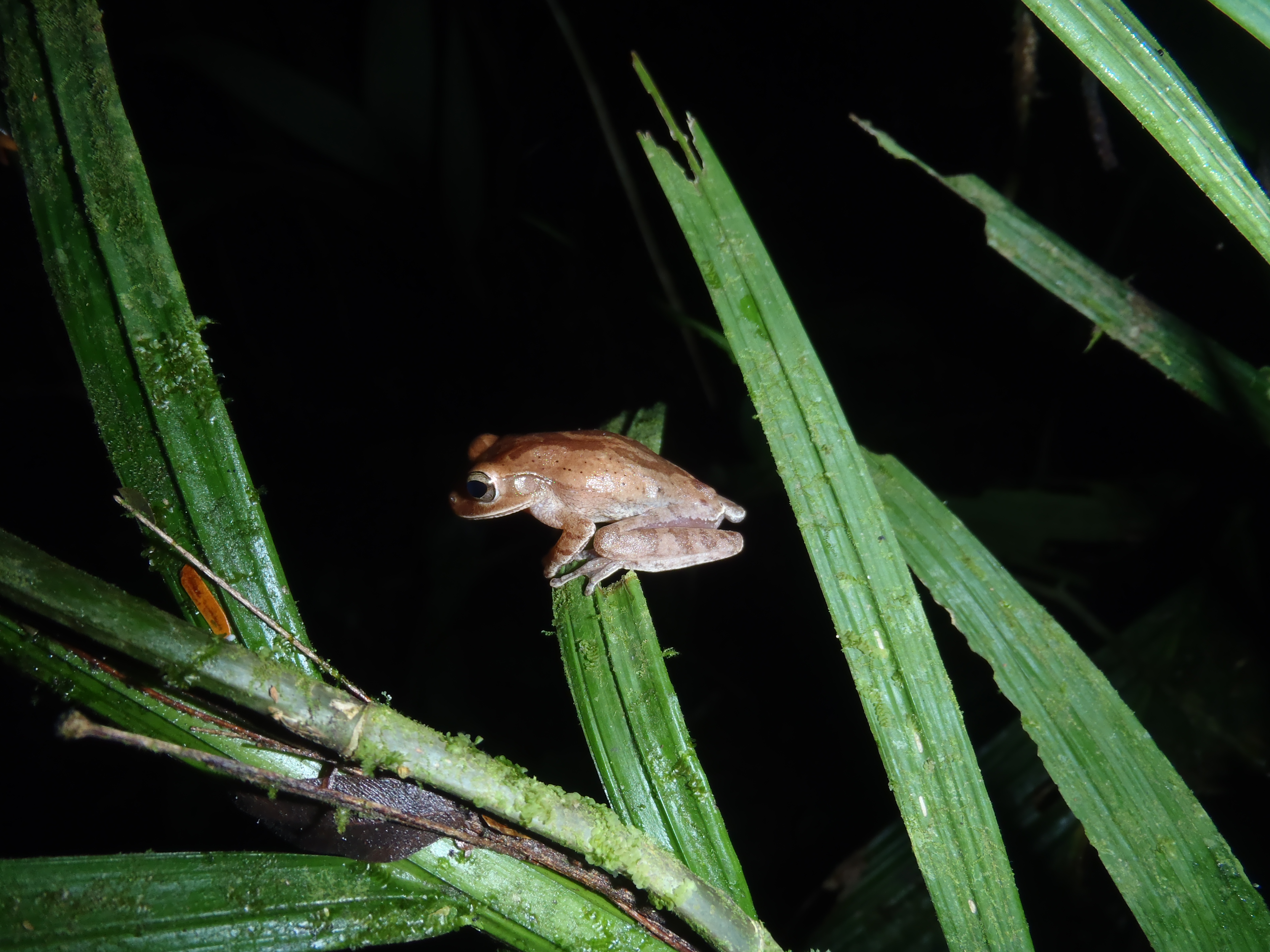

Conservation status
- Least Concern (IUCN 3.1)

Scientific classification
- Kingdom: Animalia
- Phylum: Chordata
- Class: Amphibia
- Order: Anura
- Family: Hylidae
- Genus: Smilisca
- Species: S. puma

Binomial name
- Smilisca puma (Cope, 1885)

Synonyms
- Hyla puma Cope, 1885 "1884"; Hyla wellmanorum Taylor, 1952

= Nicaragua cross-banded tree frog =

Species of amphibian

The Nicaragua cross-banded tree frog or tawny smilisca (Smilisca puma) is a species of tree frog in the family Hylidae. It is found in the Caribbean lowlands of Costa Rica and adjacent Nicaragua to about 520 m (1,710 ft) above sea level. Its natural habitats are tropical moist lowland forests. It breeds in small, shallow temporary pools or ponds, including those in very disturbed habitats, such as pastures. Males call during the rainy season from shallow water and low bushes. Habitat loss and degradation caused by small- and large-scale agriculture and logging are threats to this species.
