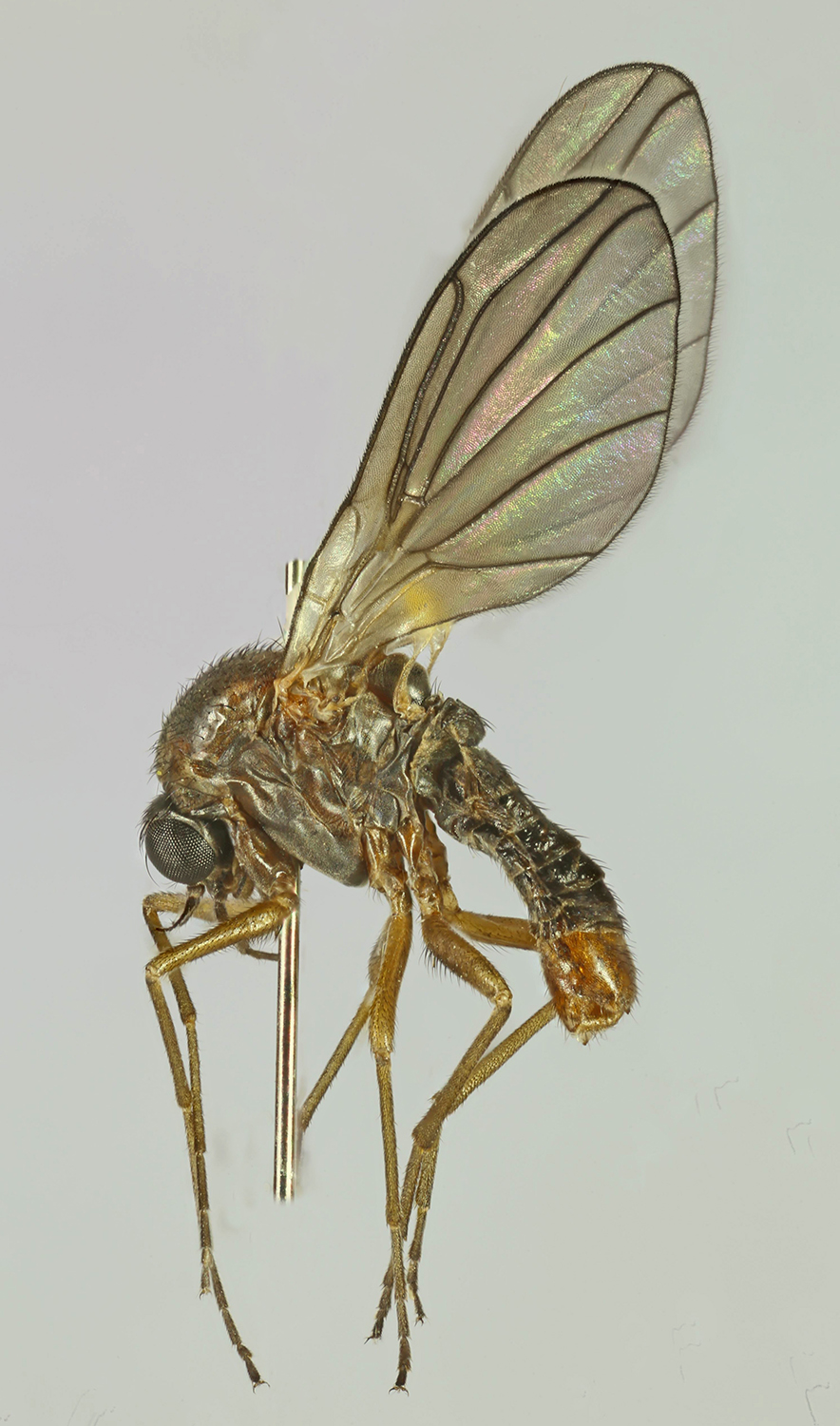
- Thaumalea verralli
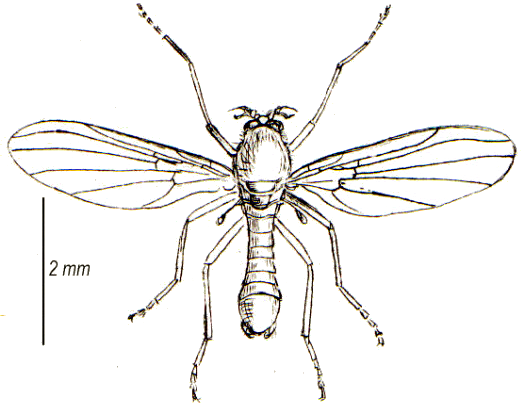
- Thaumalea testacea

Scientific classification
- Kingdom: Animalia
- Phylum: Arthropoda
- Clade: Pancrustacea
- Class: Insecta
- Order: Diptera
- Superfamily: Chironomoidea
- Family: Thaumaleidae; Bezzi, 1913

Genera
- Afrothaumalea; Androprosopa; Austrothaumalea; Niphta; Oterere; Thaumalea; Trichothaumalea

= Thaumaleidae =

Family of flies

Thaumaleidae, the solitary midges or trickle midges, are a group of nematoceran flies related to the Ceratopogonidae, Chironomidae, and the Simuliidae. They are small, stocky, yellow to brown flies (3–4 mm). Very few species are known for this family (about 120 species in five genera). Larvae are found in films on rocks and the non-feeding adults are usually found on foliage along the same streams in which the larvae are found. A few solitary midges are found in the Southern Hemisphere, but Thaumaleidae are generally a Holarctic family.

== Description ==
Adults are recognized by the seven veins reaching the margin, the costa running around the entire margin, the absence of ocelli, and particularly by the short antennae which are no longer than the head.

Wing venation of Thaumaleidae

Larvae resemble larval Lutzomyia (Psychodidae), Forcipomyia (Ceratopogonidae), and some Chironomidae. However, unpaired prolegs, a ventrally directed truncate head, and prothoracic spiracles on a short respiratory tube differentiate them.

For further information see * Family keys and image

== Biology ==
Adult Thaumaleidae are encountered infrequently, usually close to the hygropetric aquatic larval habitat. The undersides of bridges over smaller running waters are common adult gathering sites. Thaumaleid larvae are usually hygropetric in vertical, thin water films alongside waterfalls and torrents. They prefer low temperatures and are most frequent in fully shaded localities. They feed by grazing on diatoms. Little or no life history information is available.

== Name ==
The dipteran family name Orphnephilidae Rondani, 1847, based on Orphnephila Haliday, 1832, was used until Bezzi (1913) synonymized Orphnephila with Thaumalea Ruthe, 1831 and adopted Thaumaleidae, based on the senior synonym Thaumalea. This family name has been almost universally used since that time and it is to be maintained. Had Thaumaleidae not come into prevailing usage, Orphnephilidae would continue in use despite the fact that Orphnephila is a junior synonym. Thaumaleidae is cited with its own author and date, followed by the date of the replaced name in parentheses: Thaumaleidae Bezzi, 1913 (1847). It takes precedence over Orphnephilidae Rondani, 1847, and any subsequently published synonyms.
