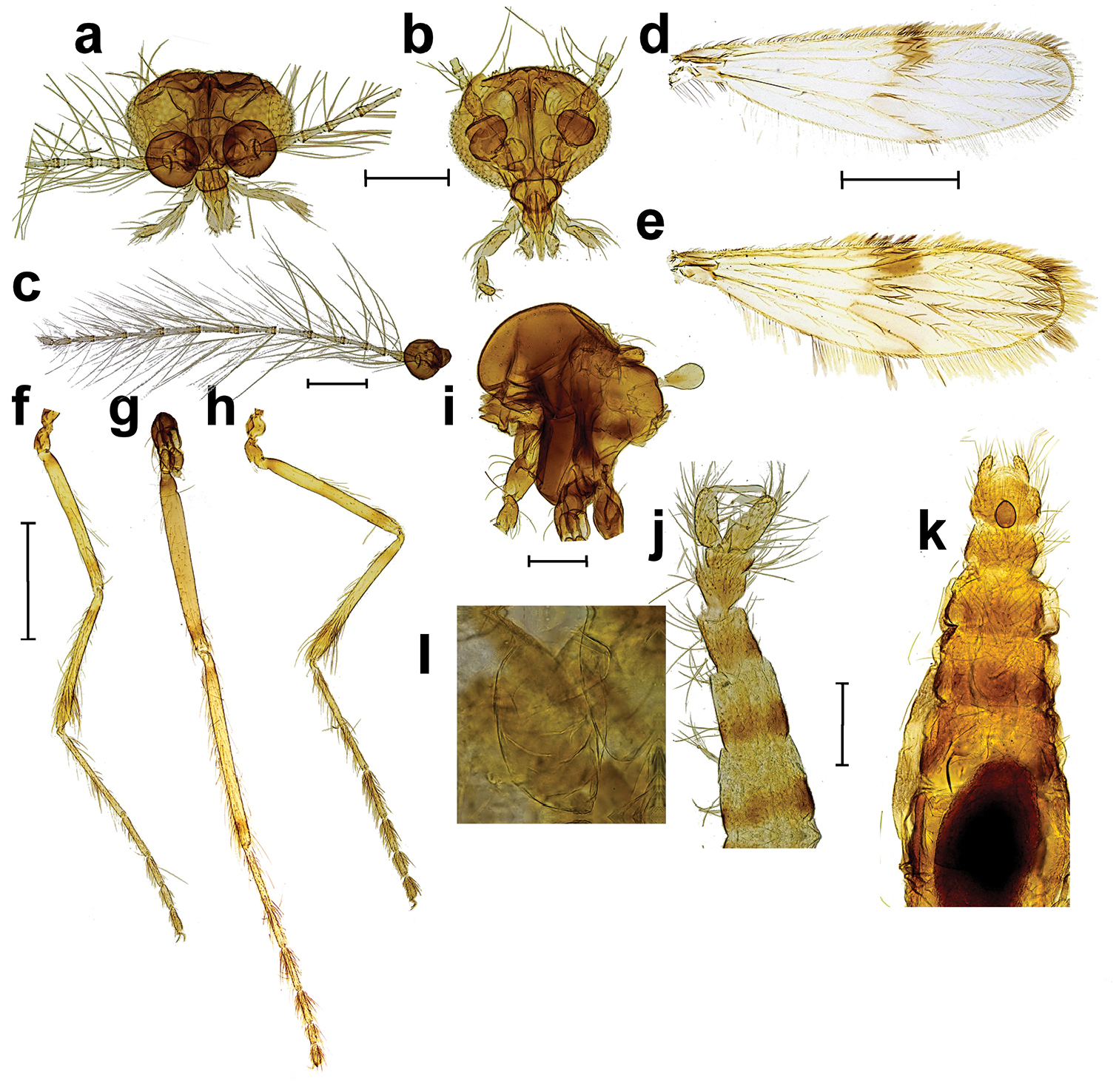
- Corethrella oppositophila

Scientific classification
- Kingdom: Animalia
- Phylum: Arthropoda
- Clade: Pancrustacea
- Class: Insecta
- Order: Diptera
- Family: Corethrellidae
- Genus: Corethrella; Coquillett, 1902

Type species
- Corethrella brakeleyi Coquillett, 1902

Species
- see text

= Corethrella =

Genus of insects

Corethrella is a genus of midges that are classified in the family Corethrellidae.

== Systematics ==
The genus currently comprises 132 extant and 10 fossil species.

=== Extant species ===
==== Subgenus Corethrella Coquillett, 1902 ====
1. Corethrella aereus Wang & Yu, 2015
2. Corethrella alba Borkent, 2008
3. Corethrella albicoxa Borkent, 2008
4. Corethrella alticola Lane, 1939
5. Corethrella amabilis Borkent, 2008
6. Corethrella amazonica Lane, 1939
7. Corethrella ananacola Dyar, 1926
8. Corethrella anniae Borkent, 2008
9. Corethrella appendiculata Grabham, 1906
10. Corethrella aridicola Borkent, 2008
11. Corethrella atricornis Borkent, 2008
12. Corethrella aurita Borkent, 2008
13. Corethrella badia Borkent, 2008
14. Corethrella belkini Borkent, 2008
15. Corethrella bicincta Borkent, Grafe & Miyagi, 2012
16. Corethrella bicolor Borkent, 2008
17. Corethrella bifida Amaral & Pinho, 2023
18. Corethrella bipigmenta Borkent & Grafe, 2012
19. Corethrella blanda Dyar, 1928
20. Corethrella blandafemur Borkent, 2008
21. Corethrella blantoni Borkent, 2008
22. Corethrella borkenti Amaral, Pinho, 2015
23. Corethrella brakeleyi (Coquillett, 1902)
24. Corethrella brandiae Borkent, 2008
25. Corethrella brevivena Borkent, 2008
26. Corethrella briannae Borkent, 2008
27. Corethrella brunnea Borkent, 2012
28. Corethrella buettikeri Cranston, 1980
29. Corethrella cabocla Feijó, Belchior, Marialva & Pessoa, 2021
30. Corethrella calathicola Edwards, 1930
31. Corethrella cambirela Amaral, Mariano & Pinho, 2019
32. Corethrella canningsi Borkent, 2008
33. Corethrella carariensis Borkent, 2008
34. Corethrella cardosoi Lane, 1942
35. Corethrella caribbeana Borkent, 2008
36. Corethrella collessi Borkent, 2008
37. Corethrella colombiana Borkent, 2008
38. Corethrella compacta Amaral & Pinho, 2025
39. Corethrella condita Borkent, 2008
40. Corethrella contraria Borkent, 2008
41. Corethrella coronata Amaral & Pinho, 2025
42. Corethrella curta Borkent, 2008
43. Corethrella davisi Shannon & Del Ponte, 1928
44. Corethrella dehuai Wang & Yu, 2015
45. Corethrella dicosimoae Borkent, 2008
46. Corethrella doryphallica Amaral & Pinho, 2025
47. Corethrella douglasi Borkent, 2008
48. Corethrella drakensbergensis Borkent, 2008
49. Corethrella edwardsi Lane, 1942
50. Corethrella evenhuisi Borkent, 2008
51. Corethrella feipengi Yu, Huang & Zhang, 2013
52. Corethrella flavitibia Lane, 1939
53. Corethrella fulva Lane, 1939
54. Corethrella fuscifimbria Amaral & Pinho, 2023
55. Corethrella fuscipalpis Borkent, 2008
56. Corethrella fusciradialis Borkent, 2008
57. Corethrella galba Borkent, 2024
58. Corethrella gilva Borkent & Grafe, 2012
59. Corethrella globosa Borkent, 2008
60. Corethrella gloma Borkent, 2008
61. Corethrella grandipalpis Borkent, 2008
62. Corethrella guadeloupensis Borkent, 2008
63. Corethrella harrisoni Freeman, 1962
64. Corethrella hirta Borkent, 2008
65. Corethrella hispaniolensis Borkent, 2008
66. Corethrella ielemdei Feijó, Ramires, Lima & Pessoa, 2021
67. Corethrella inca Lane, 1939
68. Corethrella incompta Borkent, 2008
69. Corethrella inepta Annandale, 1911
70. Corethrella infuscata Lane, 1939
71. Corethrella inornata Borkent, 2008
72. Corethrella jenningsi Lane, 1942
73. Corethrella kerrvillensis (Stone, 1965)
74. Corethrella kipferi Dorff, Borkent & Curler, 2022
75. Corethrella lepida Borkent, 2008
76. Corethrella librata Belkin, Heinemann & Page, 1970
77. Corethrella longituba Belkin, Heinemann & Page, 1970
78. Corethrella lopesi Lane, 1942
79. Corethrella lutea Borkent & Grafe, 2012
80. Corethrella manaosensis (Lane & Cerqueira, 1958)
81. Corethrella marksae Colless, 1986
82. Corethrella mckeeveri Colless, 1994
83. Corethrella melanica Lane & Aitken, 1956
84. Corethrella menini Feijó, Picelli, Ríos-Velásquez & Pessoa, 2021
85. Corethrella mitra Borkent & Grafe, 2012
86. Corethrella munteantaroku Amaral, Mariano & Pinho, 2019
87. Corethrella nanoantennalis Borkent & Grafe, 2012
88. Corethrella nippon Miyagi, 1980
89. Corethrella obtusa Amaral & Pinho, 2025
90. Corethrella oppositophila Kvifte & Bernal, 2018
91. Corethrella orthicola Borkent, 2008
92. Corethrella pallida Lane, 1942
93. Corethrella pallidula Bugledich, 1999
94. Corethrella pallitarsis Edwards, 1930
95. Corethrella parallela Amaral & Pinho, 2025
96. Corethrella patasho Amaral & Pinho, 2023
97. Corethrella pauciseta Borkent, 2008
98. Corethrella peruviana Lane, 1939
99. Corethrella picticollis Edwards, 1930
100. Corethrella pillosa Lane, 1939
101. Corethrella pindorama Amaral & Pinho, 2023
102. Corethrella procera Borkent, 2008
103. Corethrella puella Shannon & Ponte, 1928
104. Corethrella quadrivittata Shannon & Ponte, 1928
105. Corethrella ramentum Borkent, 2008
106. Corethrella ranapungens Borkent, 2008
107. Corethrella redacta Borkent, 2008
108. Corethrella remiantennalis Borkent, 2008
109. Corethrella rotunda Borkent, 2008
110. Corethrella selvicola Lane, 1939
111. Corethrella solomonis Belkin, 1962
112. Corethrella squamifemora Borkent, 2008
113. Corethrella stenostyla Amaral, Bello-González & Pinho, 2021
114. Corethrella tarsata Lane, 1942
115. Corethrella tigrina Borkent & Grafe, 2012
116. Corethrella towadensis Okada & Hara, 1962
117. Corethrella travassosi Lane, 1942
118. Corethrella trivittata Amaral & Pinho, 2025
119. Corethrella truncata Borkent, 2008
120. Corethrella ugandensis Borkent, 2008
121. Corethrella unifasciata Amaral & Pinho, 2023
122. Corethrella unisetosa Borkent, 2008
123. Corethrella unizona Borkent & Grafe, 2012
124. Corethrella urumense Miyagi, 1980
125. Corethrella varia Borkent, 2008
126. Corethrella vittata Lane, 1939
127. Corethrella whartoni Vargas, 1952
128. Corethrella wirthi Stone, 1968
129. Corethrella xokleng Amaral, Mariano & Pinho, 2019
130. Corethrella yanomami Amaral, Mariano & Pinho, 2019
131. Corethrella yucuman Caldart & Pinho, 2016

==== Subgenus Notocorethrella Belkin, 1968 ====
1. Corethrella novaezealandiae Tonnoir, 1927

==== Nomina dubia ====
- Corethrella barrettoi Lane, 1942
- Corethrella japonica (Komyo, 1954)
- Corethrella maculata Lane, 1939
- Corethrella shannoni Lane, 1939
- Corethrella stonei Lane, 1942
- Corethrella striata Lane, 1942
- Corethrella whitmani Lane, 1942

=== Fossil species ===
==== Subgenus Corethrella Coquillett, 1902 ====
1. Corethrella andersoni Poinar & Szadziewski, 2007
2. Corethrella baltica Borkent, 2008
3. Corethrella dominicana Borkent, 2008
4. Corethrella miocaenica Szadziewski, Krzeminski and Kutscher, 1994
5. Corethrella nudistyla Borkent and Szadziewski, 1992
6. Corethrella patula Baranov & Kvifte, 2019
7. Corethrella prisca Borkent & Szadziewski, 1992
8. Corethrella rovnoensis Baranov & Kvifte, 2016
9. Corethrella sontagae Baranov & Kvifte, 2016

==== Subgenus Fossicorethrella Szadziewski, 1995 ====
1. Corethrella cretacea Szadziewski, 1995
