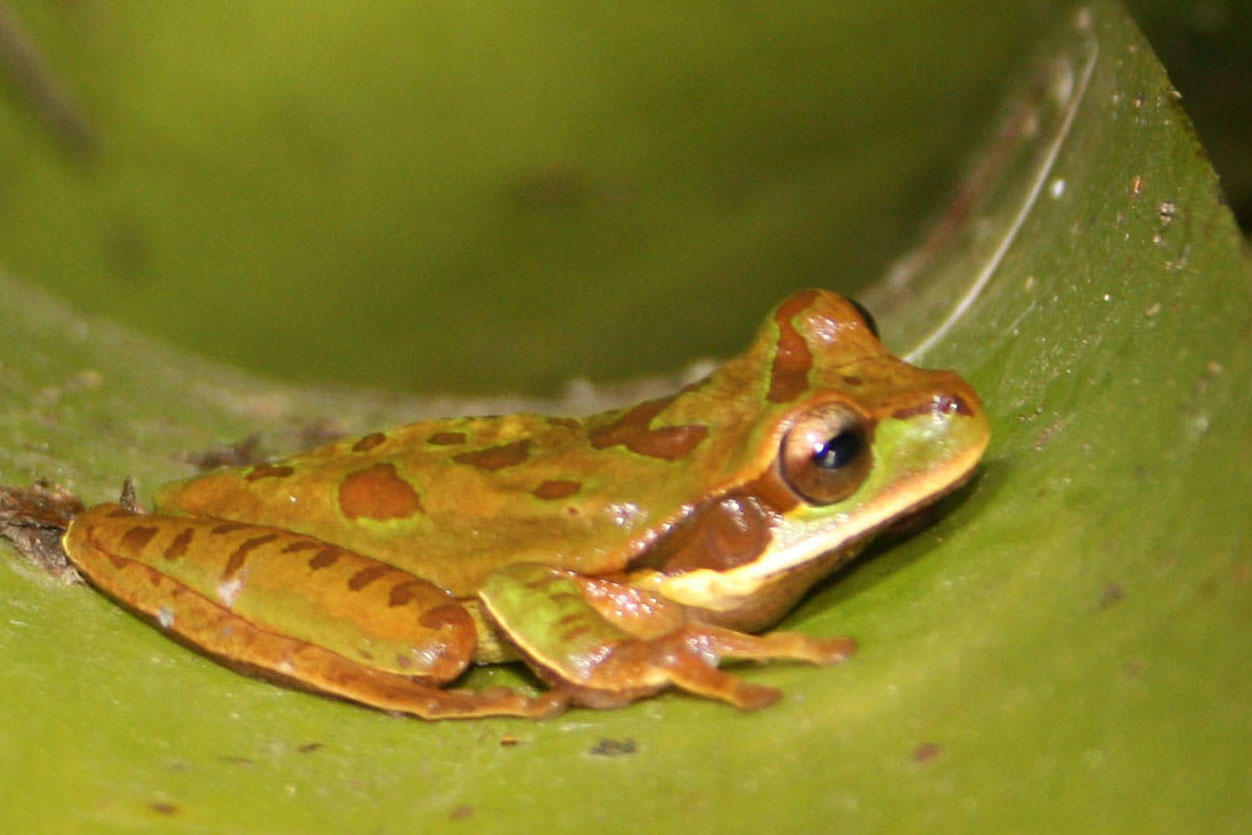

Conservation status
- Least Concern (IUCN 3.1)

Scientific classification
- Kingdom: Animalia
- Phylum: Chordata
- Class: Amphibia
- Order: Anura
- Family: Hylidae
- Genus: Smilisca
- Species: S. phaeota

Binomial name
- Smilisca phaeota (Cope, 1862)

= New Granada cross-banded tree frog =

Species of amphibian

The New Granada cross-banded tree frog (Smilisca phaeota), also known as the masked tree frog, is a species of frog in the family Hylidae found in Colombia, Costa Rica, Ecuador, Honduras, Nicaragua, and Panama. Its natural habitats are subtropical or tropical dry forest, subtropical or tropical moist lowland forest, rivers, freshwater marshes, intermittent freshwater marshes, plantations, rural gardens, urban areas, heavily degraded former forests, ponds, and canals and ditches.

Their nickname of masked tree frog comes from the black or dark colored markings that start at their nose and go back along the face toward their ear, covering their eye.

Because it goes across their eye, it can help with camouflage, as many predators find prey by their open eyes.

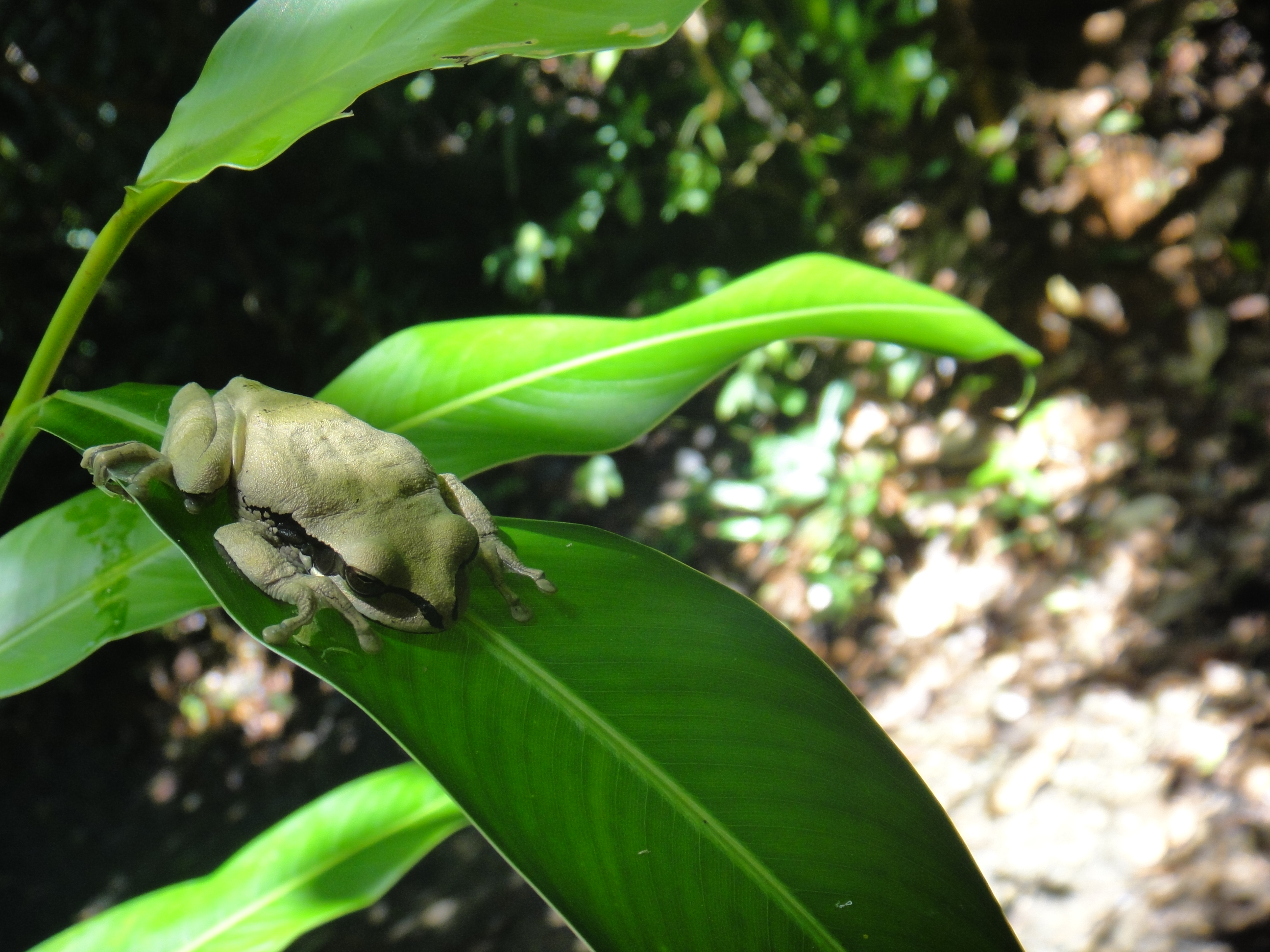
Masked tree frog resting during the day.

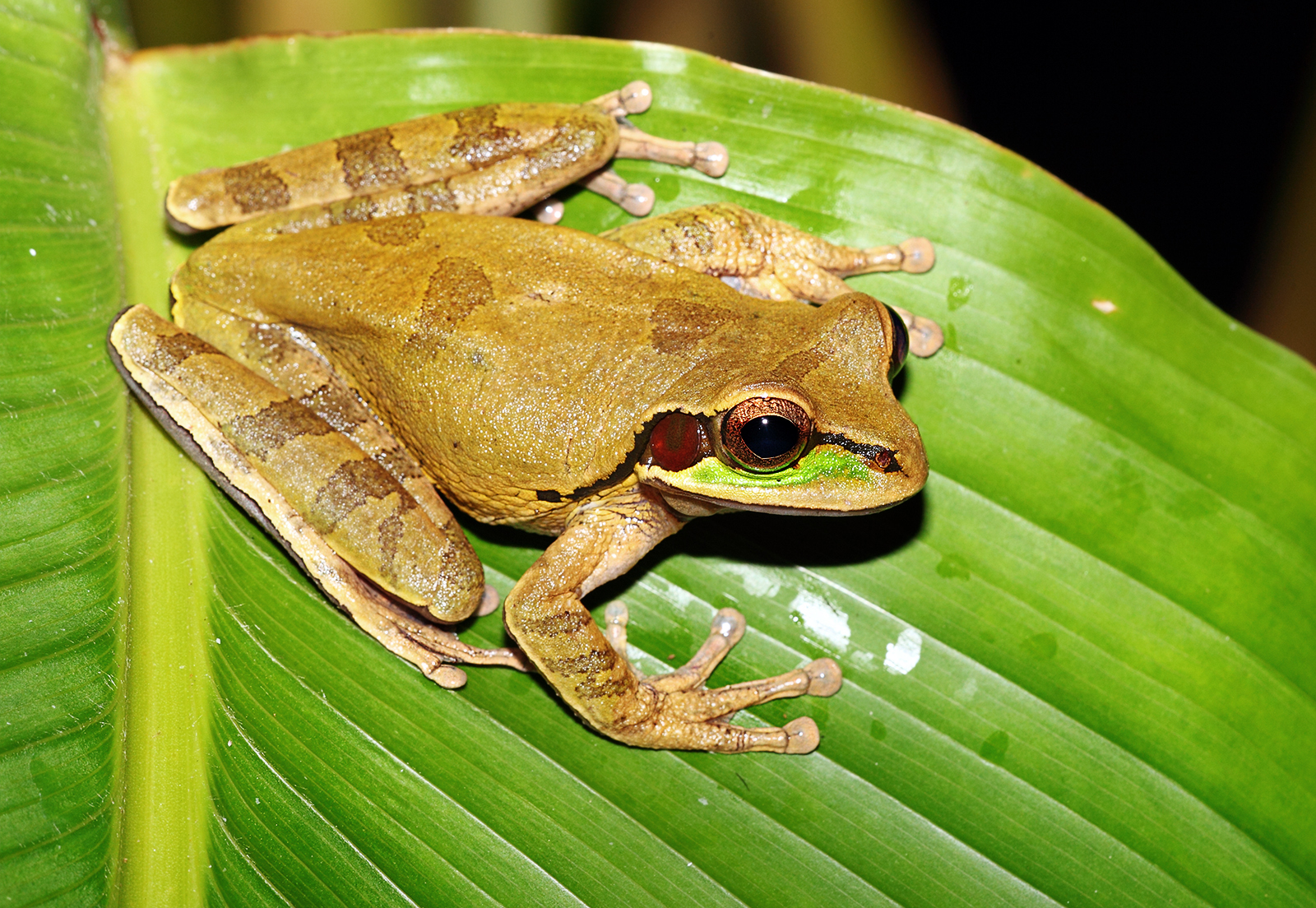
Smilisca phaeota, pictured here on the Osa Peninsula of Costa Rica
