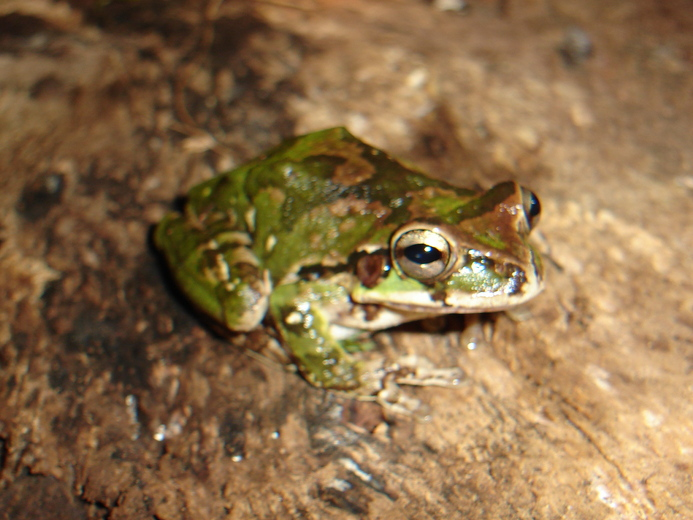

Conservation status
- Least Concern (IUCN 3.1)

Scientific classification
- Kingdom: Animalia
- Phylum: Chordata
- Class: Amphibia
- Order: Anura
- Family: Hylidae
- Genus: Smilisca
- Species: S. baudinii

Binomial name
- Smilisca baudinii Duméril & Bibron, 1841

Synonyms
- Hyla baudinii Hyla vanvlietii Hyla vociferans Hyla muricolor Smilisca daulinia Hyla beltrani Hyla manisorum

= Common Mexican tree frog =

Species of amphibian

The common Mexican tree frog (Smilisca baudinii) is a nocturnal species of tree frog whose native range extends from the Sonoran Desert and the Lower Rio Grande Valley of Texas south to Costa Rica. Common names include Mexican tree frog, Baudin's tree frog and Van Vliet's frog. They are usually found within lightly forested areas near permanent sources of water.

== Description ==
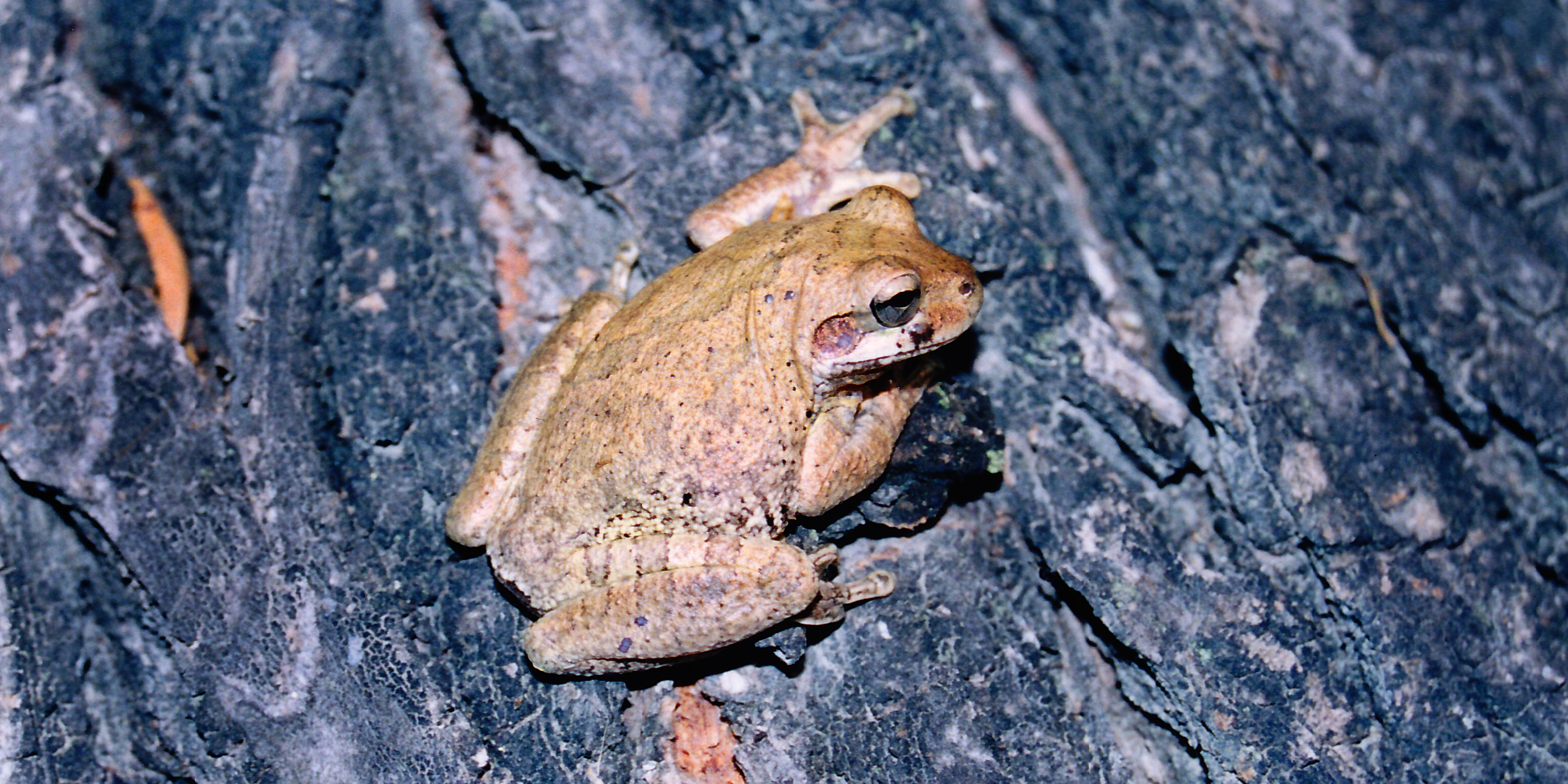
Mexican Treefrog (Smilisca baudinii), Municipality of Abasolo, Tamaulipas, Mexico (18 May 2002).

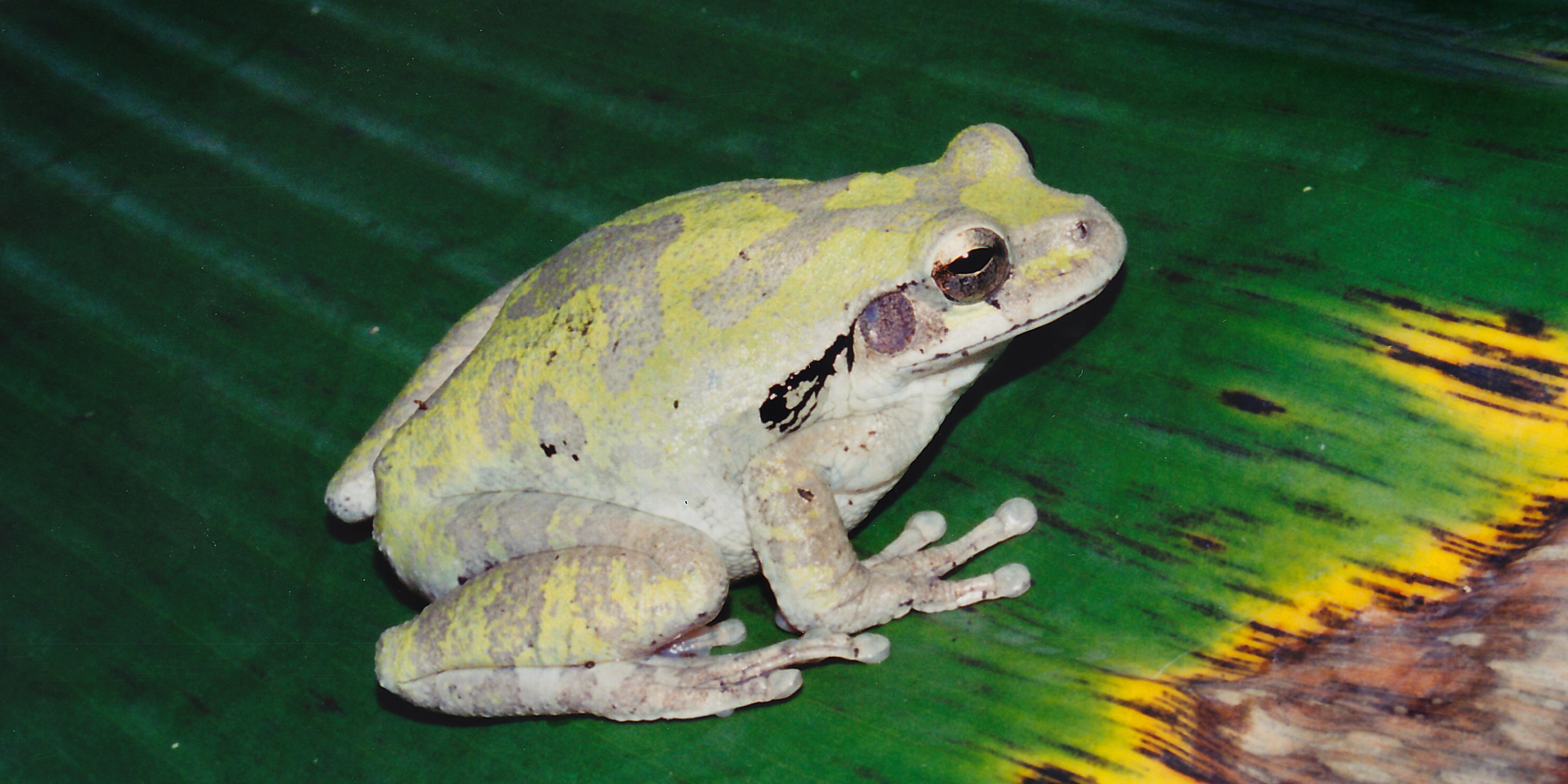
Mexican Treefrog (Smilisca baudinii), Gómez Farías, Municipality of Gómez Farías, Tamaulipas, Mexico (8 August 2004).

The common Mexican tree frog is generally brown-grey in color, with darker brown, irregular blotching. Its underside is typically a lighter grey or white. Its legs have distinctive dark banding.

== Taxonomy ==
The species has numerous synonymous classifications due to disjunct populations, and was mistakenly redescribed on several occasions by field researchers.

== Conservation ==
The common Mexican tree frog is considered to be a threatened species in the US state of Texas. It has only been reported in a few counties, and no estimates of its actual population count have been made.
