= Corethrellidae =

Corethrellidae Temporal range: Cretaceous-Recent, 110–0 Ma
- Wing venation R1 is short

Scientific classification
- Kingdom: Animalia
- Phylum: Arthropoda
- Class: Insecta
- Order: Diptera
- Superfamily: Culicoidea
- Family: Corethrellidae; Edwards, 1932

Genera
- Corethrella Coquillett, 1902

Family of flies

Corethrellidae are a family of biting midges, small flying insects belonging to the order Diptera, females of which feed on the blood of frogs. The members of the family are sometimes known as frog-biting midges. The family currently consists of just one genus, totalling 115 extant and 10 fossil species worldwide. Most extant species are found in the lower latitudes, usually associated around the tropics.

They are tiny flies with a wing length of 0.6-2.5 mm. The wing venation is similar to Culicidae (R 4 branched, M 2 branched, Cu 2 branched) with branches of Rs and M nearly parallel. R1 is, however, closer to Sc or almost midway between Sc and R2. They were, from 1962 until 1989, placed as a tribe Corethrellini within the Chaoborinae, a subfamily of Culicidae.

Adult female Corethrella are attracted to the mating calls of male frogs, their chosen host taxa. As obligate external parasites, the midges feed almost exclusively on the blood of these frogs. Because of this, Corethrella follow typical distribution patterns of external parasites and are restricted to only areas with abundant populations of their host frogs. Female midges most likely detect their hosts using a specialized organ called a Johnston's organ, a collection of sensory cells found on the second antenna segment. There is evidence of host specificity and selection of particular biting sites for some species. Corethrella species have been observed sucking blood from individuals of the tree frog genus Hyla. Specifically, the North American tree frog species Hyla avivoca, Hyla cinerea and Hyla gratiosa were recorded as confirmed corethrellid hosts in a 1977 study.

A few, select species are known vectors of frog-specific species of the parasitic protozoan Trypanosoma. Corethrellid parasitism is thus a recorded cause of trypanosomiasis among host frog populations.

The family contains members that date to the lower Cretaceous Period some 110 million years ago. At least one species, Corethrella andersoni, has been found in Burmese amber deposits dating from this time.

== Development ==
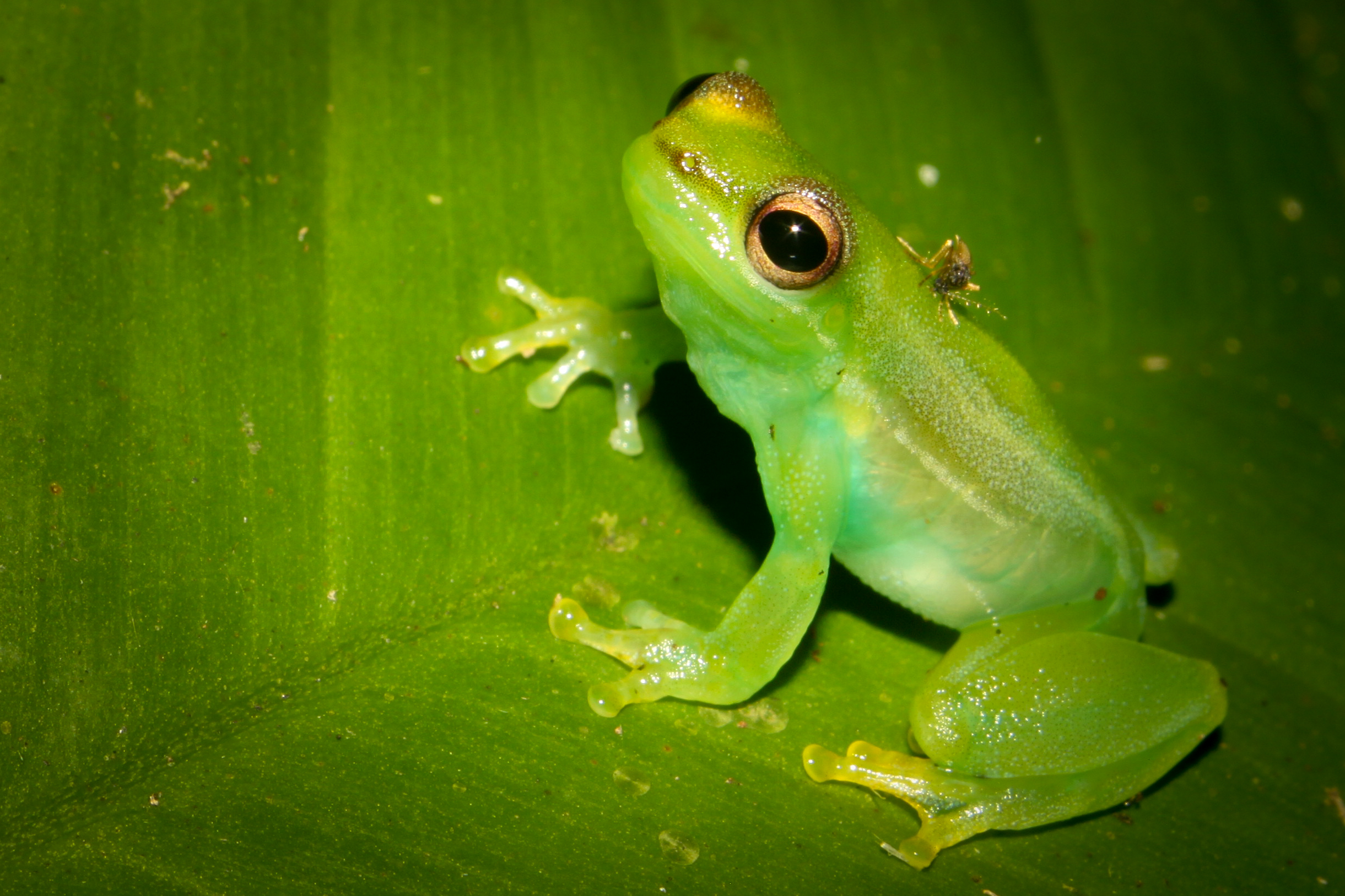
Corethrella biting Sphaenorhynchus pauloalvini

Larvae of the Corethrellidae resemble those of phantom midges (Chaoboridae) and inhabit small collections of water, often within tree holes, leaf axils, or occasionally subterranean pools. They are predatory, using their elongated antennae to seize small arthropods in a rapid, snap-like motion.

== Bibliography ==
- "Corethrellidae". Integrated Taxonomic Information System.
- "Corethrella". Integrated Taxonomic Information System.
- "Lutzomiops". Integrated Taxonomic Information System.
