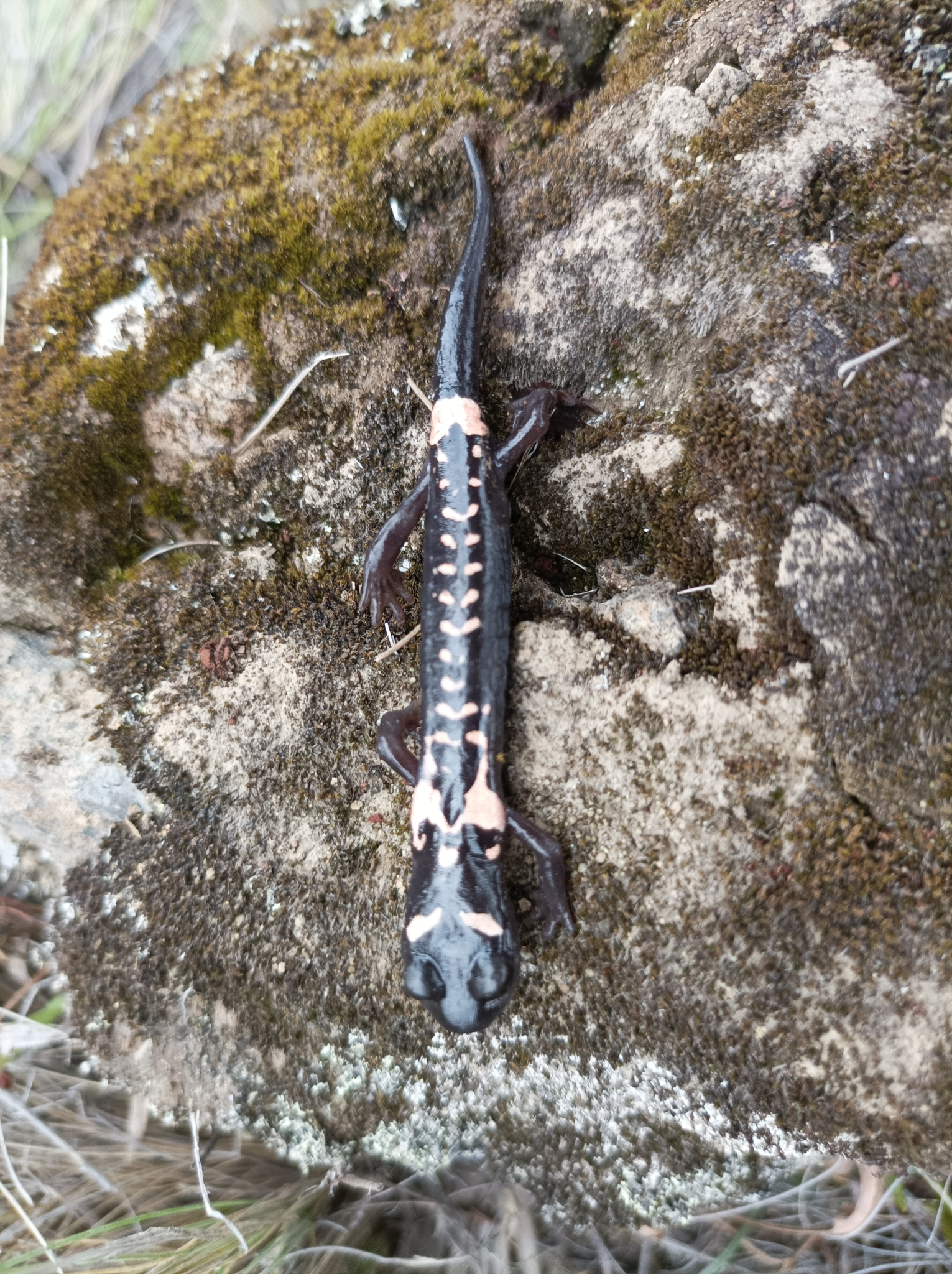

Conservation status
- Critically Endangered (IUCN 3.1)

Scientific classification
- Kingdom: Animalia
- Phylum: Chordata
- Class: Amphibia
- Order: Urodela
- Family: Plethodontidae
- Genus: Isthmura
- Species: I. naucampatepetl

Binomial name
- Isthmura naucampatepetl (Parra-Olea, Papenfuss, and Wake, 2001)

Synonyms
- Pseudoeurycea naucampatepetl Parra-Olea, Papenfuss, and Wake, 2001

= Isthmura naucampatepetl =

Species of amphibian

Isthmura naucampatepetl, commonly known as the Cofre de Perote salamander, is a species of salamanders in the family Plethodontidae. It is endemic to the Sierra Madre Oriental in central Veracruz, Mexico, where it is known from between Cofre de Perote and Cerro Volcancillo, a satellite peak of Cofre de Perote.

== Etymology ==
The specific name naucampatepetl is Nahuatl name for Cofre de Perote.

== Description ==
Adult males measure 68–82 mm (2.7–3.2 in) and females up to 83 mm (3.3 in) in snout–vent length (SVL). The tail is slender and shorter than SVL; it tapers gradually but has a blunt tip. The body is moderately robust. The head is prominent and the eyes are large and relatively protuberant. The snout is large and broadly rounded. The limbs are long and robust. The digits are well developed, and there is no appreciable webbing. The coloration is striking, with solid black background color and with bright pink to pinkish-cream dorsal spots: there is a pair of rounded spots on the back of the head, about the size of the eyeball in diameter, a small mid-dorsal spot in the neck, and a pair of large spots at the level of the forelimbs. These larger spots are followed by 11 pairs of small spots. Finally, there is a conspicuous U-shaped mark behind the hips, pointing backward. The venter is pale gray to dark gray.

== Habitat and conservation ==
Its natural habitat is pine-oak forest at elevations of 2,500–3,000 m (8,200–9,800 ft) above sea level, with plenty of bunch grass. All specimens in the type series were found on roadside banks, under a surface layer of moist soil with a somewhat dry outer crust.

This species is known from only six specimens. An individual was photographed in 2015, but surveys have failed to locate the species. Extensive logging, farming, and expanding human settlements have led to loss of much of the original habitat, and what remains is very degraded. The IUCN SSC Amphibian Specialist Group considers Isthmura naucampatepetl critically endangered.
