= Graceful splayfoot salamander =

Conservation status
- Vulnerable (IUCN 3.1)

Scientific classification
- Kingdom: Animalia
- Phylum: Chordata
- Class: Amphibia
- Order: Urodela
- Family: Plethodontidae
- Genus: Chiropterotriton
- Species: C. cracens

Binomial name
- Chiropterotriton cracens Rabb, 1958

Synonyms
- Chiropterotriton chondrostega cracens Rabb, 1958

Species of amphibian

The graceful splayfoot salamander (Chiropterotriton cracens), also known as the graceful flat-footed salamander, is a species of salamander in the family Plethodontidae. It is endemic to the state of Tamaulipas in northeastern Mexico. Its type locality is near Gómez Farías, Tamaulipas.

== Description ==
Chiropterotriton cracens is a small, slender salamander. Adults measure 24–31 mm (0.94–1.22 in) in snout–vent length. The tail is long, maximally 1.5 times the snout-vent length. Limbs are well developed; hind legs are slightly longer than forelegs. Dorsal colour is light brown, sides are slightly darker.

Females collected in summer had more and smaller eggs than those collected in spring when eggs were quite large, 1–2.5 mm (0.039–0.098 in), but few in number (3-5 per side). Juveniles (12–14 mm (0.47–0.55 in) body length) have been collected in May and August.

== Habitat and conservation ==
Its natural habitat are cloud forests between 1000 and 2000 meters elevation, where it lives in bromeliads.

Chiropterotriton cracens only known from the El Cielo Biosphere Reserve, a protected area. Despite this, Chiropterotriton cracens has declined. The reasons for this decline are unknown but could relate to climate change or disease (e.g. chytridiomycosis).
