= Alta Cima =

- Village
- Alta Cima
- Interactive map of Alta Cima
- Location within Tamaulipas Location within Mexico
- Coordinates: 23°03′40″N 99°11′55″W
- Country: Mexico
- State: Tamaulipas
- Municipality: Gómez Farías

Population
  - Total: 180

Alta Cima is a village located within El Cielo Biosphere Reserve, in the municipality of Gómez Farías in Tamaulipas, Mexico. There are approximately 180 residents living in 40 households. The nearest cities are Ciudad Mante and Ciudad Victoria.

== Tourism ==
There is one hotel in Alta Cima, Hotel El Pino, which consists of cabins and campsites. The homes of residents of Alta Cima are open to visitors and tourists, and some operate ecotourism guiding businesses.

== Natural Resources ==
Alta Cima and the surrounding nature reserve are biodiversity hotspots. Bird watching is popular with more than 255 species of resident birds and 175 migrants.
