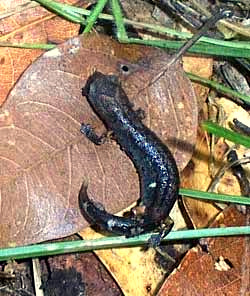
- Aquiloeurycea rubrimembris showing a little red on the hind legs and tail

Scientific classification
- Kingdom: Animalia
- Phylum: Chordata
- Class: Amphibia
- Order: Urodela
- Family: Plethodontidae
- Genus: Aquiloeurycea
- Species: A. rubrimembris

Binomial name
- Aquiloeurycea rubrimembris Taylor & Smith, 1945

Synonyms
- Bolitoglossa cephalica rubrimembris Taylor & Smith, 1945; Pseudoeurycea cephalica rubrimembris (Taylor & Smith, 1945)

= Aquiloeurycea rubrimembris =

Species of amphibian

Aquiloeurycea rubrimembris, the red-legged false brook salamander, is a rare, seldom documented species of salamander native just to a highland part of central Mexico. It belongs to the family Plethodontidae.

== Description ==
Here are key features distinguishing Aquiloeurycea rubrimembris:

- It occurs only in a limited part of the highlands of east-central Mexico.
- It is short, stubby, mostly black but modestly adorned with red patches. The body is up to 5.3 cm (2 in) long, with the tail about 3.8 cm (1 1/2 in) in length. The head, with distinctly pitted skin, is short, with the eye greater than the mouth's length. The broad head is about 9 mm (3/8 in) wide. The tail has approximately 22 grooves.
- It is similar to Aquiloeurycea cephalica, but with more red on the greater portion of the legs and the rear third or fourth of the tail.

== Distribution ==
Endemic just to east-central Mexico, Aquiloeurycea rubrimembris occurs in the southeastern part of the state of San Luis Potosí, eastern Querétaro, northern Hidalgo, and the state of México.

== Habitat ==
Aquiloeurycea rubrimembris has been found beneath stones in a grassy, unforested ravine at 4,500 m (14,800 ft) in elevation. In Querétaro state, at 1,900 m (6,200 ft) in elevation, it inhabits humid, mixed forests of pine and oak, while in Hidalgo state between 1,400 and 2,000 m (4,600 and 6,600 ft) it occurs in the same habitat, with bromeliads, beneath bark on moist trees, and among dead leaves on the ground. On this page is shown an individual found on moist, moss- and leaf-covered ground in a mountaintop relict community of Sweetgum trees, Liquidambar styraciflua, at an elevation of about 2,900 m (9,500 ft), in Querétaro state.

== Behavior ==
As Aquiloeurycea rubrimembris moves forward in a normal manner, the tail follows straight back, except for the terminal 13 mm (1/2 in) or so, which is flipped forward with each step made by one particular leg. Upon being swung forward into position, the tip is placed on the ground, and then by straightening and pivoting on the tip the tail pushes the body forward. This is repeated with each step.

== Conservation status ==
The conservation status of Aquiloeurycea rubrimembris does not appear to have been formally established, though it has been mentioned that in one of the few sites in which it has been observed, ecology of the area is very threatened by deforestation and urban development.

== Taxonomy ==
In 1945, Edward Harrison Taylor and Hobart Muir Smith formally described and name Aquiloeurycea rubrimembris under the basionym of Bolitoglossa cephalica rubrimembris. In 2026 the latter taxon was considered a synonym of Aquiloeurycea rubrimembris by GBIF, Catalogue of Life and Mexico's taxonomic authority EncicloVida (CONABIO). As recently as 2014, Aquiloeurycea rubrimembris was treated as a subspecies of Pseudoeurycea cephalica, and was considered to be part of a species complex.

=== Etymology ===
The genus name Aquiloeurycea is constructured from the Latin aquilo, which refers to the north wind or just "north," with the -eurycea referencing the genus Eurycea, thus "northern Eurycea". The distribution of Eurycea species is northern to most other genera of the subfamily Bolitoglossinae, to which the genus belongs. Eurycea is part of the story because Aquiloeurycea rubrimembris earlier was considered to be Pseudoeurycea cephalica rubrimembris.

The species name rubrimembris is from the Latin rubrum, meaning "reddish," and membrum, meaning "part." This refers to reddish color at the tail's tip.
