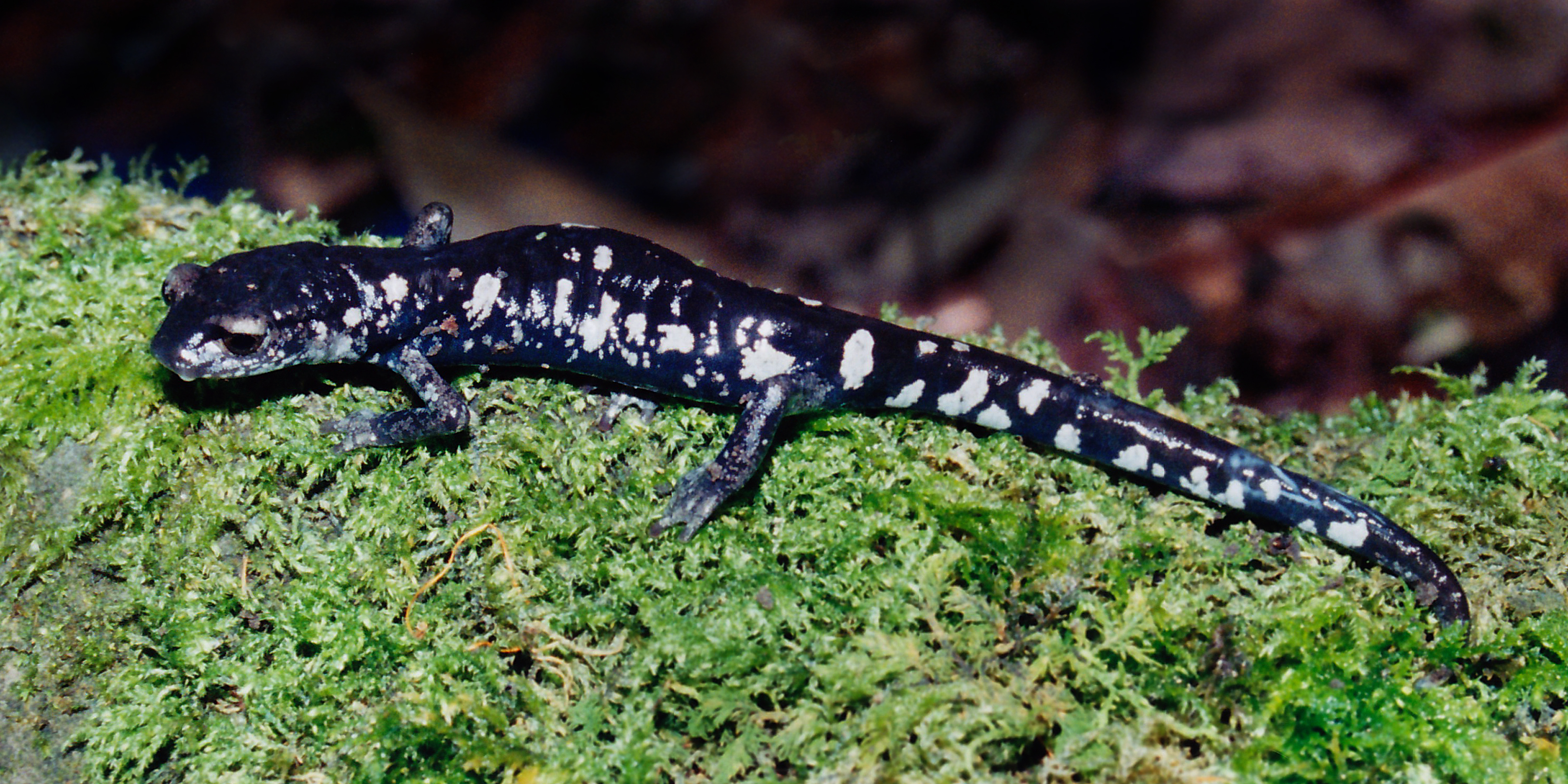
- Aquiloeurycea scandens

Scientific classification
- Kingdom: Animalia
- Phylum: Chordata
- Class: Amphibia
- Order: Urodela
- Family: Plethodontidae
- Subfamily: Hemidactyliinae
- Genus: Aquiloeurycea; Rovito, Parra-Olea, Recuero, and Wake, 2015

Type species
- Spelerpes cephalicus Cope, 1869

= Aquiloeurycea =

Genus of salamanders

Aquiloeurycea is a genus of salamanders in the family Plethodontidae. They are endemic to Mexico. The genus corresponds to the former "Pseudoeurycea cephalica species group", which was established in order to preserve Ixalotriton and Bolitoglossa while avoiding paraphyly of Pseudoeurycea.

== Species ==
It contains the following species:

- Aquiloeurycea cafetalera (Parra-Olea, Rovito, Márquez-Valdelmar, Cruz, Murrieta-Galindo, and Wake, 2010)
- Aquiloeurycea cephalica (Cope, 1865)
- Aquiloeurycea galeanae (Taylor, 1941)
- Aquiloeurycea praecellens (Rabb, 1955)
- Aquiloeurycea quetzalanensis (Parra-Olea, Canseco-Márquez, and García-París, 2004)
- Aquiloeurycea rubrimembris (Taylor & Smith, 1945)
- Aquiloeurycea scandens (Walker, 1955)

== Gallery ==
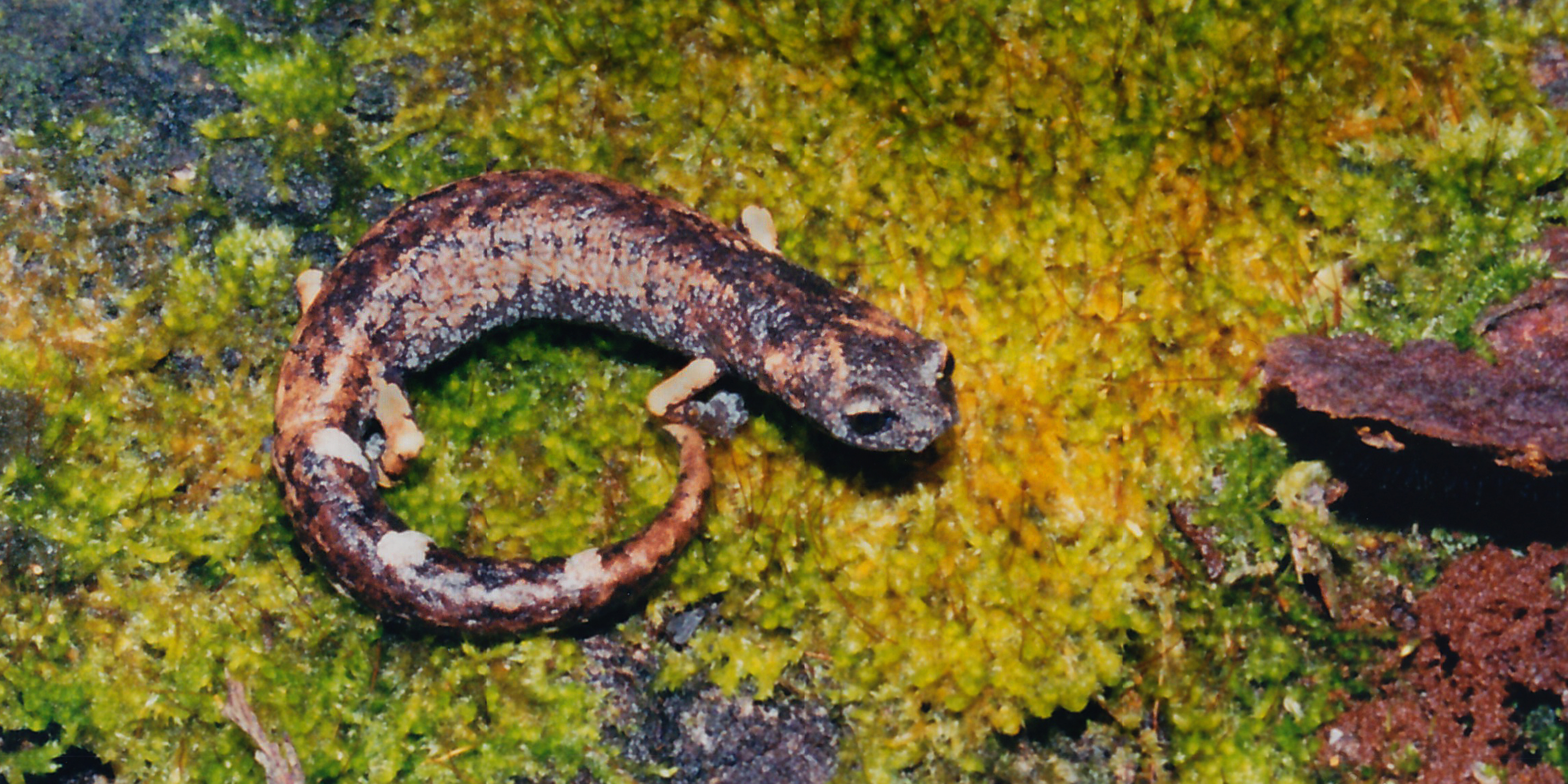
Chunky false brook salamander (Aquiloeurycea cephalica), El Cielo Biosphere Reserve, Municipality of Gómez Farías, Tamaulipas, Mexico (12 August 2004).

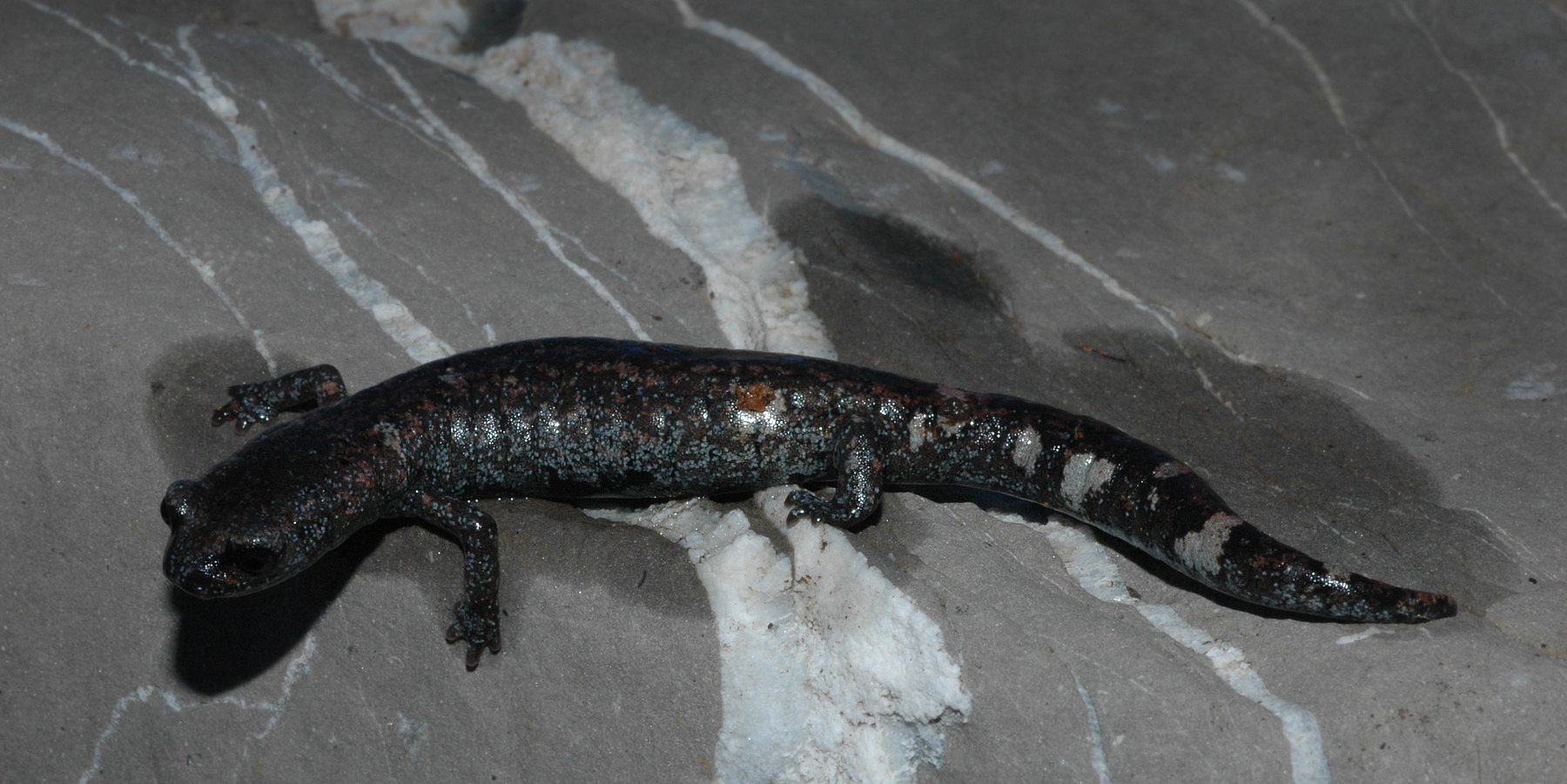
Galeana false brook salamander (Aquiloeurycea galeanae). Miquihuana, Tamaulipas, Mexico, 5 October 2008. W. L. Farr

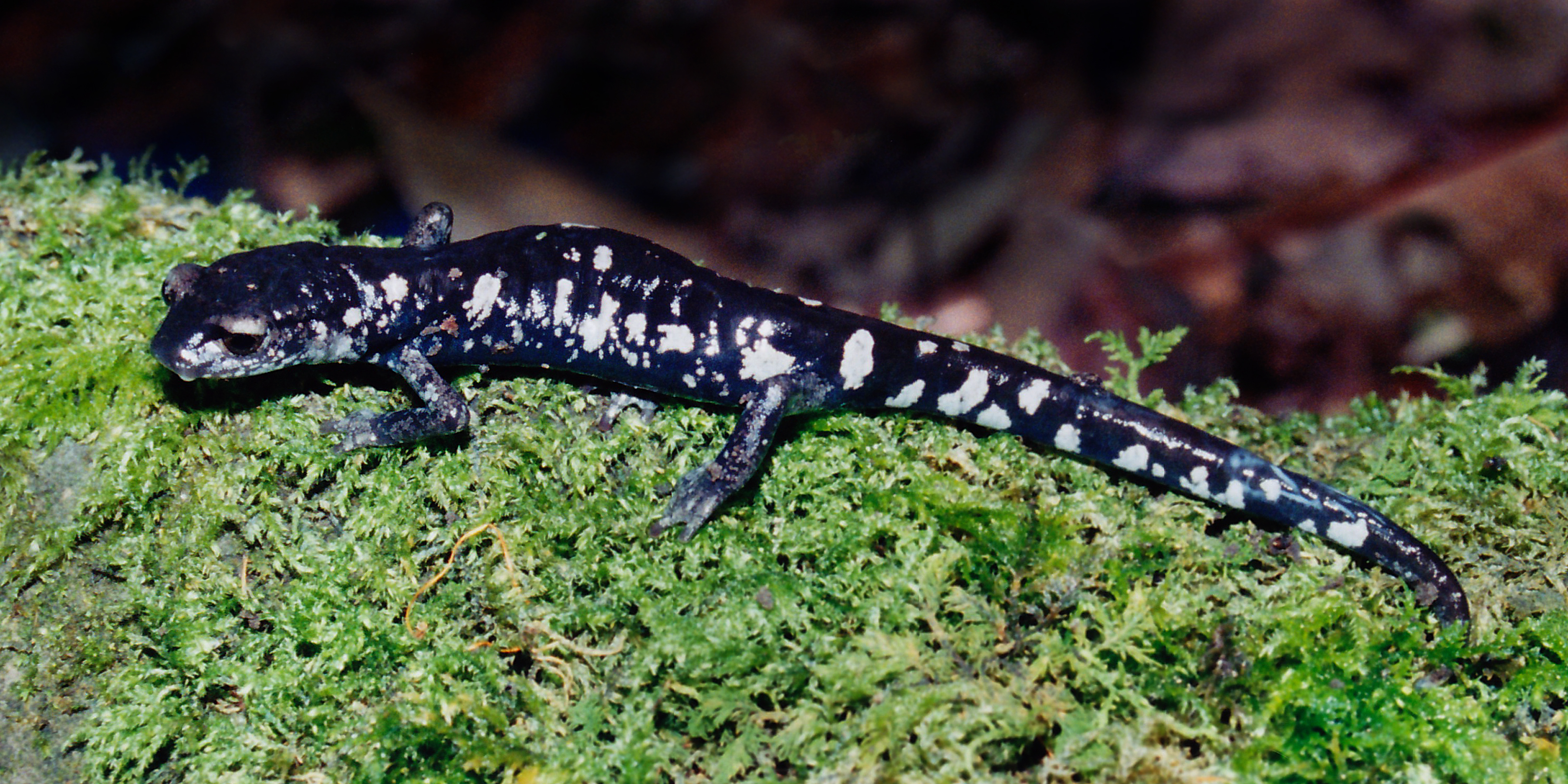
Tamaulipan false brook salamander (Aquiloeurycea scandens), El Cielo Biosphere Reserve, Municipality of Gómez Farías, Tamaulipas, Mexico (25 May 2005).
