= Isthmura boneti =

Conservation status
- Endangered (IUCN 3.1)

Scientific classification
- Kingdom: Animalia
- Phylum: Chordata
- Class: Amphibia
- Order: Urodela
- Family: Plethodontidae
- Genus: Isthmura
- Species: I. boneti

Binomial name
- Isthmura boneti (Alvarez and Martín, 1967)

Synonyms
- Pseudoeurycea boneti Alvarez and Martín, 1967

Species of amphibian

Isthmura boneti, commonly known as the Oaxacan false brook salamander, is a species of salamander in the family Plethodontidae. It is endemic to north-central Oaxaca, Mexico. Its natural habitats are pine and pine-oak forests at high elevations. It is terrestrial and found beneath logs and rocks. Formerly very abundant, the species has declined for unknown reasons; it has also declined in suitable habitat, so habitat loss is not a sufficient explanation.
