= Cuetzalan salamander =

Conservation status
- Critically Endangered (IUCN 3.1)

Scientific classification
- Kingdom: Animalia
- Phylum: Chordata
- Class: Amphibia
- Order: Urodela
- Family: Plethodontidae
- Genus: Aquiloeurycea
- Species: A. quetzalanensis

Binomial name
- Aquiloeurycea quetzalanensis (Parra-Olea, Canseco-Márquez, and García-París, 2004)

Synonyms
- Pseudoeurycea quetzalanensis Parra-Olea, Canseco-Márquez, and García-París, 2004

Species of amphibian

The Cuetzalan salamander (Aquiloeurycea quetzalanensis) is a species of salamander in the family Plethodontidae. It is endemic to the Sierra Madre Oriental in Puebla, Mexico. Its specific name refers to its type locality, Cuetzalan del Progreso. Its natural habitat is cloud forest, but it also occurs in coffee groves. It has been found in a range of micro-habitats, such as under moss in rock walls, under stones, inside and under rotten logs, and in leaf axils. It might be threatened by habitat loss caused by human settlements and tourist development.
