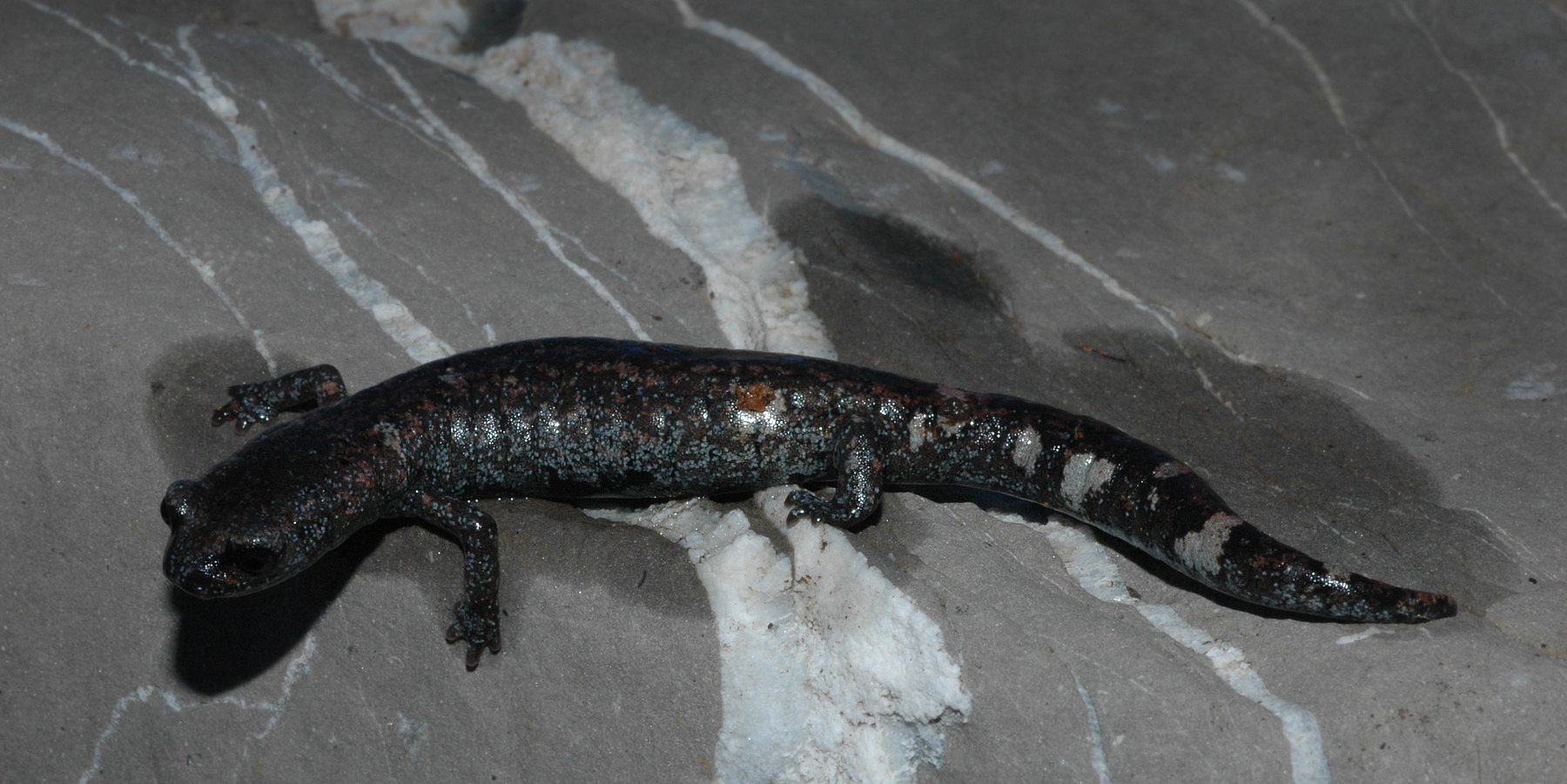
- In Tamaulipas, Mexico

Conservation status
- Vulnerable (IUCN 3.1)

Scientific classification
- Kingdom: Animalia
- Phylum: Chordata
- Class: Amphibia
- Order: Urodela
- Family: Plethodontidae
- Genus: Aquiloeurycea
- Species: A. galeanae

Binomial name
- Aquiloeurycea galeanae (Taylor, 1941)

Synonyms
- Bolitoglossa galaenae Taylor, 1941; Bolitoglossa galeanae Taylor, 1941 (emendation); Pseudoeurycea galeanae (Taylor, 1941)

= Aquiloeurycea galeanae =

Species of amphibian

Aquiloeurycea galeanae, commonly known as the Galeana false brook salamander, is a species of salamander in the family Plethodontidae. It is endemic to north-eastern Mexico and known from higher elevations in the Sierra Madre Oriental of southern Nuevo León (including elevations above the eponymic Galeana) as well as adjacent Coahuila and Tamaulipas.

== Description ==
Aquiloeurycea galeanae is a relatively large salamander. Two males in the type series measure 50–52 mm (2.0–2.0 in) and four females 66–70 mm (2.6–2.8 in) in snout–vent length (SVL). The tail is shorter than the body; the maximum SVL and total length are 75–135 mm (3.0–5.3 in), respectively. The head is relatively large and wider than the body. The eyes are moderately large. The digits are webbed at their base and have rounded pads at their tips. Skin is smooth. The body is slaty to purplish black. There are a few relatively large, irregular whitish lichen like spots, particularly on the tail, and smaller flecks of brown, tan, to dull red specks on the dorsum. The ventrum is slightly lighter than the dorsum. The tips of the digits are also lighter in color.

== Habitat and conservation ==
Natural habitats of this species are semi-open pine-oak forests with madrone and agaves at elevations of 1,800–2,800 m (5,900–9,200 ft) above sea level, up to 2936 meters in Tamaulipas. It is a terrestrial salamander that can be found under stones. It tolerates some habitat modification and has been found in agave plantations and scrubby open country. It can be locally abundant. The main threat to this species is complete clearance of its habitats. It is not known to occur in any protected area.
