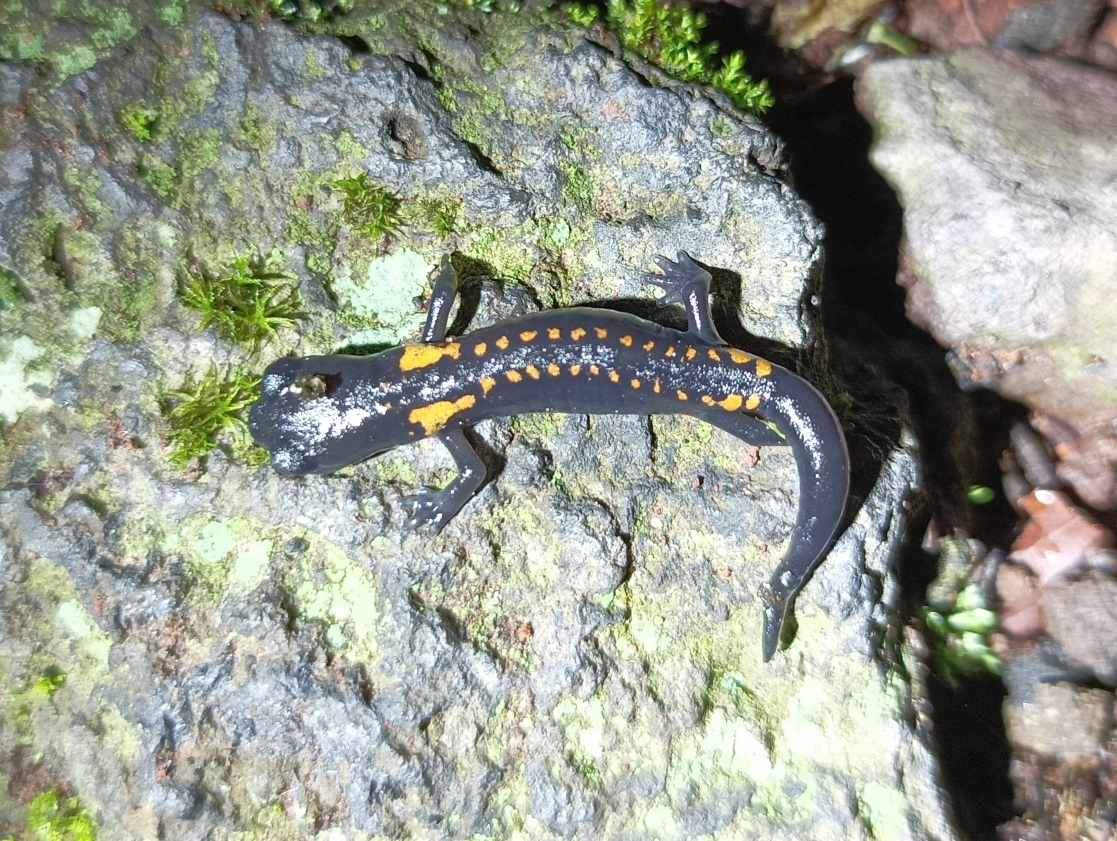

Conservation status
- Endangered (IUCN 3.1)

Scientific classification
- Kingdom: Animalia
- Phylum: Chordata
- Class: Amphibia
- Order: Urodela
- Family: Plethodontidae
- Genus: Isthmura
- Species: I. gigantea

Binomial name
- Isthmura gigantea (Taylor, 1939)

Synonyms
- Oedipus giganteus Taylor, 1939 "1938"; Bolitoglossa gigantea (Taylor, 1939); Pseudoeurycea gigantea (Taylor, 1939)

= Isthmura gigantea =

Species of amphibian

Isthmura gigantea, commonly known as the giant false brook salamander, is a species of salamander in the family Plethodontidae. It is endemic to Mexico and known from the eastern margins Sierra Madre Oriental between north-eastern Hidalgo and northern Puebla and central Veracruz near Xalapa.

The natural habitat of this terrestrial species is the pine-oak/cloud forest interface at elevations of 1,000–2,000 m (3,300–6,600 ft) above sea level. It tolerates some habitat disturbance but is threatened from severe habitat loss from logging, mining, agriculture, and human settlement that is occurring within its range.
