= Southern giant salamander =

Conservation status
- Endangered (IUCN 3.1)

Scientific classification
- Kingdom: Animalia
- Phylum: Chordata
- Class: Amphibia
- Order: Urodela
- Family: Plethodontidae
- Genus: Isthmura
- Species: I. maxima

Binomial name
- Isthmura maxima (Parra-Olea, García-París, Papenfuss, and Wake, 2005)

Synonyms
- Pseudoeurycea maxima Parra-Olea, García-París, Papenfuss, and Wake, 2005

Species of amphibian

The southern giant salamander (Isthmura maxima) is a species of salamander in the family Plethodontidae. It is endemic to Mexico and known from the Sierra Madre del Sur of western and southern Oaxaca and eastern Guerrero. It is the largest tropical salamander; the holotype had a total length of about 24 cm (9.4 in) and weighed 58 grams (2.0 oz).

== Description ==
Adult males measure 90–125 mm (3.5–4.9 in) and females 89–128 mm (3.5–5.0 in) in snout–vent length (SVL). The tail is moderately long, on average 99% of SVL in males and 85% SVL in females. The coloration is variable, but in general it is uniformly black, with markings consisting of parallel rows of vivid red-orange to pale orange spots on the head, body, and proximal part of the tail. The body is robust, and the head is large and relatively broad but with short snout. The limbs are long and robust. The fingers and toes are well developed but relatively short and without appreciable webbing.

== Habitat and conservation ==
This little-known salamander has been found in a banana field and a roadside bank at elevations of 750–2,000 m (2,460–6,560 ft) above sea level. It appears to live in permanent burrows. Although it seems to tolerate some habitat modification, urbanization and changed agricultural practices are potential threats. It is not known from any protected areas.
