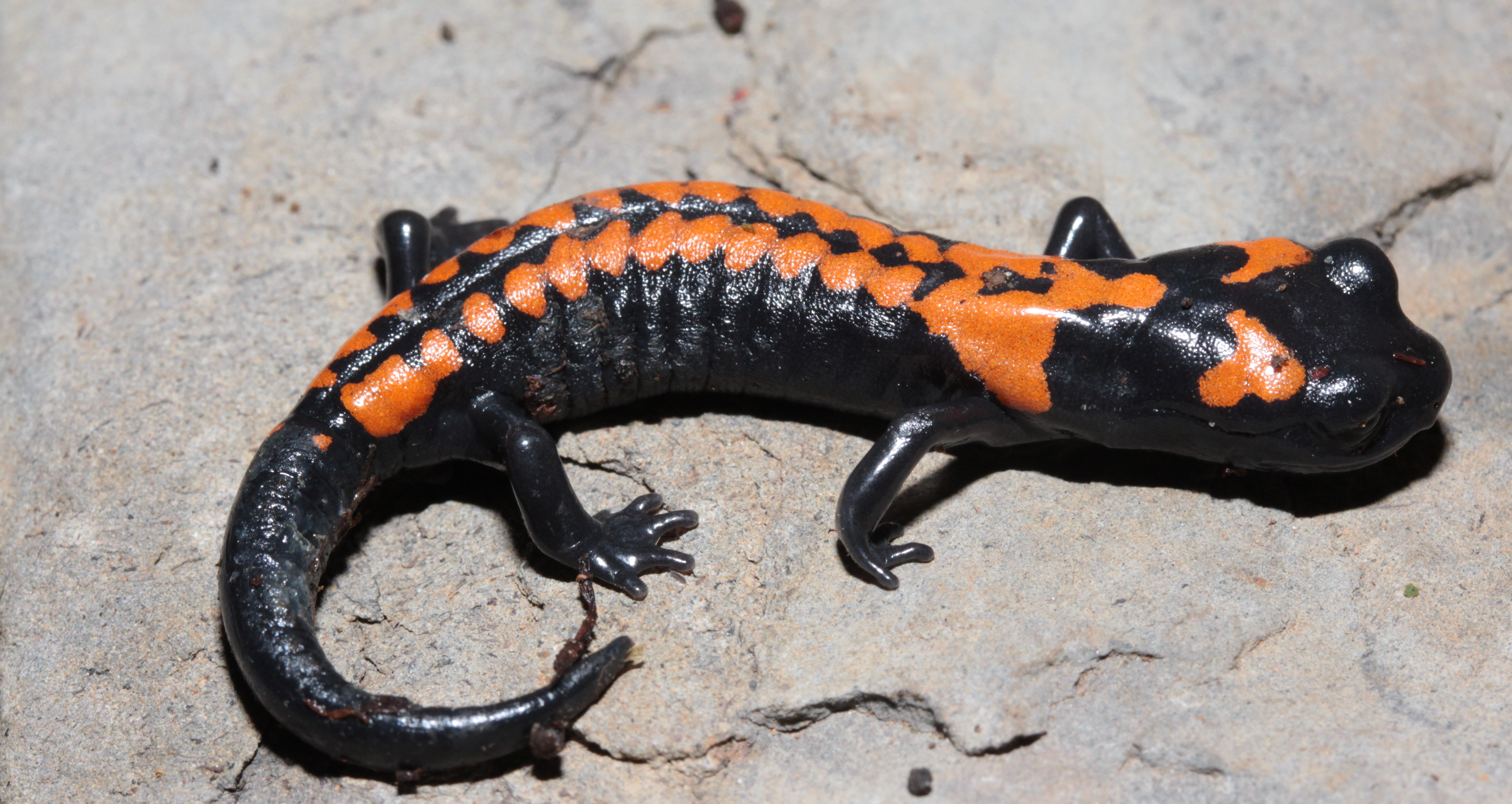
- Isthmura bellii

Scientific classification
- Kingdom: Animalia
- Phylum: Chordata
- Class: Amphibia
- Order: Urodela
- Family: Plethodontidae
- Subfamily: Hemidactyliinae
- Genus: Isthmura; Dubois and Raffaelli, 2012

Type species
- Spelerpes belli Gray, 1850

Species
- 7 species (see text)

= Isthmura =

Genus of salamanders

Isthmura is a genus of salamanders in the family Plethodontidae. They are endemic to Mexico. The genus, which corresponds to the former "Pseudoeurycea bellii species group" and was first described as a subgenus of Pseudoeurycea, was raised to full generic level in 2015 in order to preserve Ixalotriton and Bolitoglossa while avoiding paraphyly of Pseudoeurycea.

== Description ==
Isthmura are large to very large salamanders, and the largest plethodontid salamanders in the Neotropics. They have robust, black bodies that usually have bold red, orange, or pink markings. The toes have slight webbing. The fifth toe is well-developed. They inhabit montane forests mostly above 2,000 m (6,600 ft), although Isthmura gigantea and Isthmura maxima have lower minimum altitude limits (respectively 1,000 and 750 m (3,280 and 2,460 ft)).

== Species ==
Isthmura contains the following species:

- Isthmura bellii (Gray, 1850)
- Isthmura boneti (Alvarez and Martín, 1967)
- Isthmura corrugata Sandoval-Comte, Pineda-Arredeondo, Rovito, and Luría-Manzano, 2017
- Isthmura gigantea (Taylor, 1939)
- Isthmura maxima (Parra-Olea, García-París, Papenfuss, and Wake, 2005)
- Isthmura naucampatepetl (Parra-Olea, Papenfuss, and Wake, 2001)
- Isthmura sierraoccidentalis (Lowe, Jones, and Wright, 1968)
