= Aquiloeurycea praecellens =

Conservation status
- Critically endangered, possibly extinct (IUCN 3.1)

Scientific classification
- Kingdom: Animalia
- Phylum: Chordata
- Class: Amphibia
- Order: Urodela
- Family: Plethodontidae
- Genus: Aquiloeurycea
- Species: A. praecellens

Binomial name
- Aquiloeurycea praecellens (Rabb, 1955)

Synonyms
- Parvimolge praecellens Rabb, 1955; Pseudoeurycea praecellens

Species of amphibian

Aquiloeurycea praecellens, also known as the admirable false brook salamander, is a species of salamander in the family Plethodontidae. It is endemic to the Sierra Madre Oriental in Veracruz, Mexico. Its natural habitat is lowland tropical moist forest where it is threatened by habitat loss.

== Description ==
Aquiloeurycea praecellens is a stocky, ground dwelling species that may reach a total length of 6.5 centimetres (2.6 in), almost half of which is tail. It has short, strong limbs and partially webbed fingers and toes. The general colour is brownish black and there are whitish spots along the sides and on the tail. The underside is paler brown. There is some doubt as to the validity of this species as it is only known from a single specimen (holotype) found in 1940. It was an immature specimen so its full size when mature is not known. However, it is likely that it is the smallest species of false brook salamander. The eggs probably hatch directly into small salamanders.

== Distribution ==
Aquiloeurycea praecellens is known from humid tropical forest on the Atlantic side of the Sierra Madre Oriental near Cordoba in Veracruz State in Mexico. Another sighting was made in a canyon at Teocelo near Jalapa, but this may not have been the same species.

== Conservation ==
Aquiloeurycea praecellens is listed in the IUCN Red List of Threatened Species as Critically Endangered. This is because only a single individual has ever been recorded (in 1940) and it was found not far from the city of Cordoba, which has expanded considerably since that date. It is unlikely that any suitable habitat survives.
