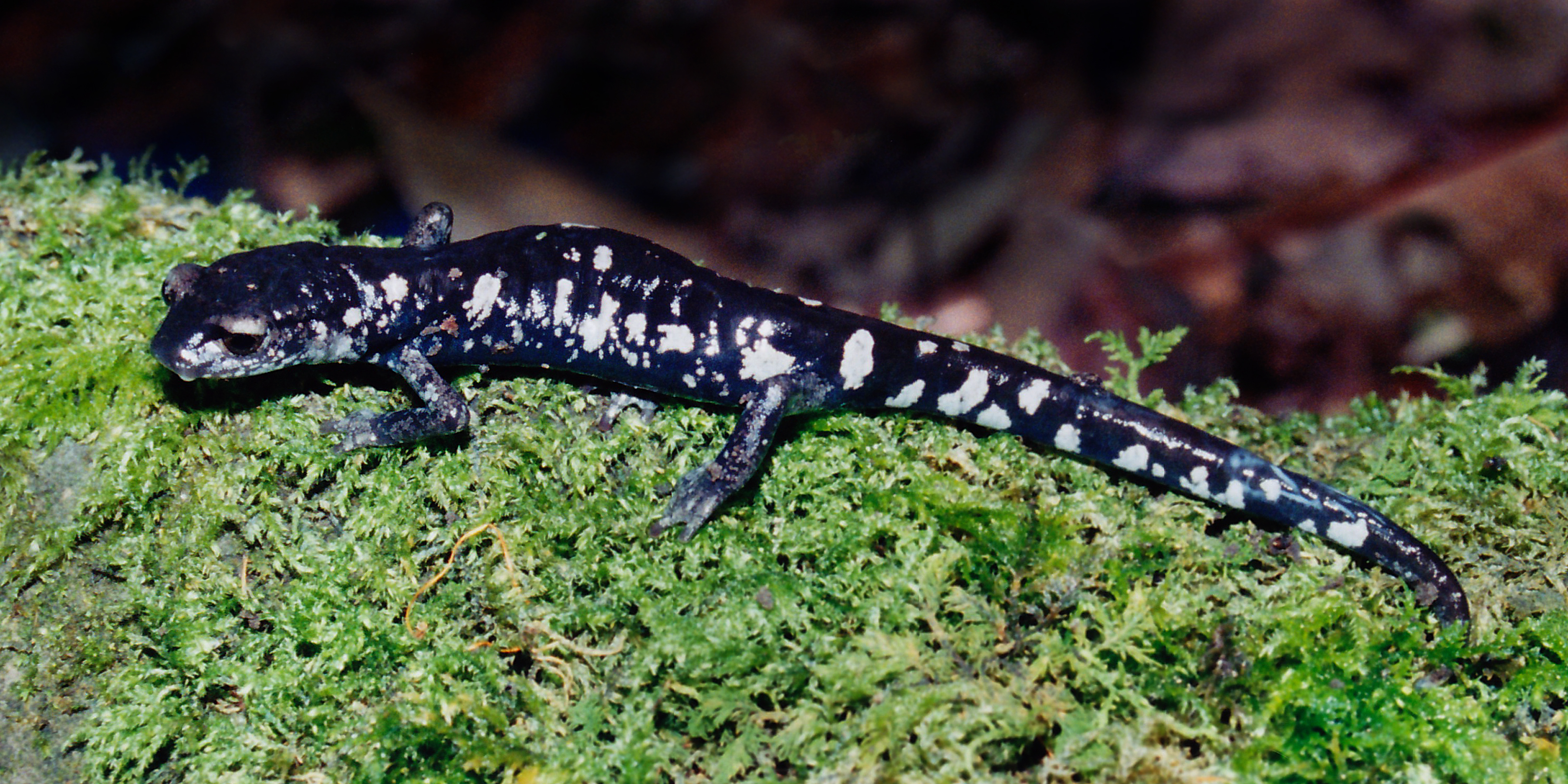
- At El Cielo Biosphere Reserve, Tamaulipas, Mexico

Conservation status
- Least Concern (IUCN 3.1)

Scientific classification
- Kingdom: Animalia
- Phylum: Chordata
- Class: Amphibia
- Order: Urodela
- Family: Plethodontidae
- Genus: Aquiloeurycea
- Species: A. scandens

Binomial name
- Aquiloeurycea scandens (Walker, 1955)

Synonyms
- Pseudoeurycea scandens Walker, 1955

= Aquiloeurycea scandens =

Species of amphibian

Aquiloeurycea scandens, commonly known as the Tamaulipan false brook salamander, is a species of salamander in the family Plethodontidae. It is endemic to Mexico and known from the El Cielo Biosphere Reserve in southern Tamaulipas. There are also reports from San Luis Potosí and Coahuila, but these may well refer to other, as yet unnamed species.

Its natural habitat is caves. Within the El Cielo Biosphere Reserve its habitat is well protected. It was once fairly common, but has not been seen after mid-1980s. Whether this reflects a genuine decline or low survey effort is not known.
