= Gómez Farías, Tamaulipas =

Municipal seat in Tamaulipas

Gómez Farías
- Municipality
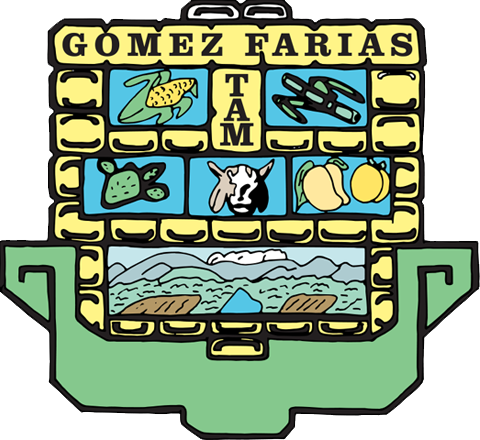
- Coat of arms

- Location in Mexico Gómez Farías (Mexico)
- Country: Mexico
- State: Tamaulipas
- Demonym: (in Spanish)
- Time zone: UTC−6 (CST)

Gómez Farías is the municipal seat of Gómez Farías Municipality, Tamaulipas.

As of 2010 Gómez Farías was the 2nd most populous locality in Gómez Farías Municipality, having 883 inhabitants.
