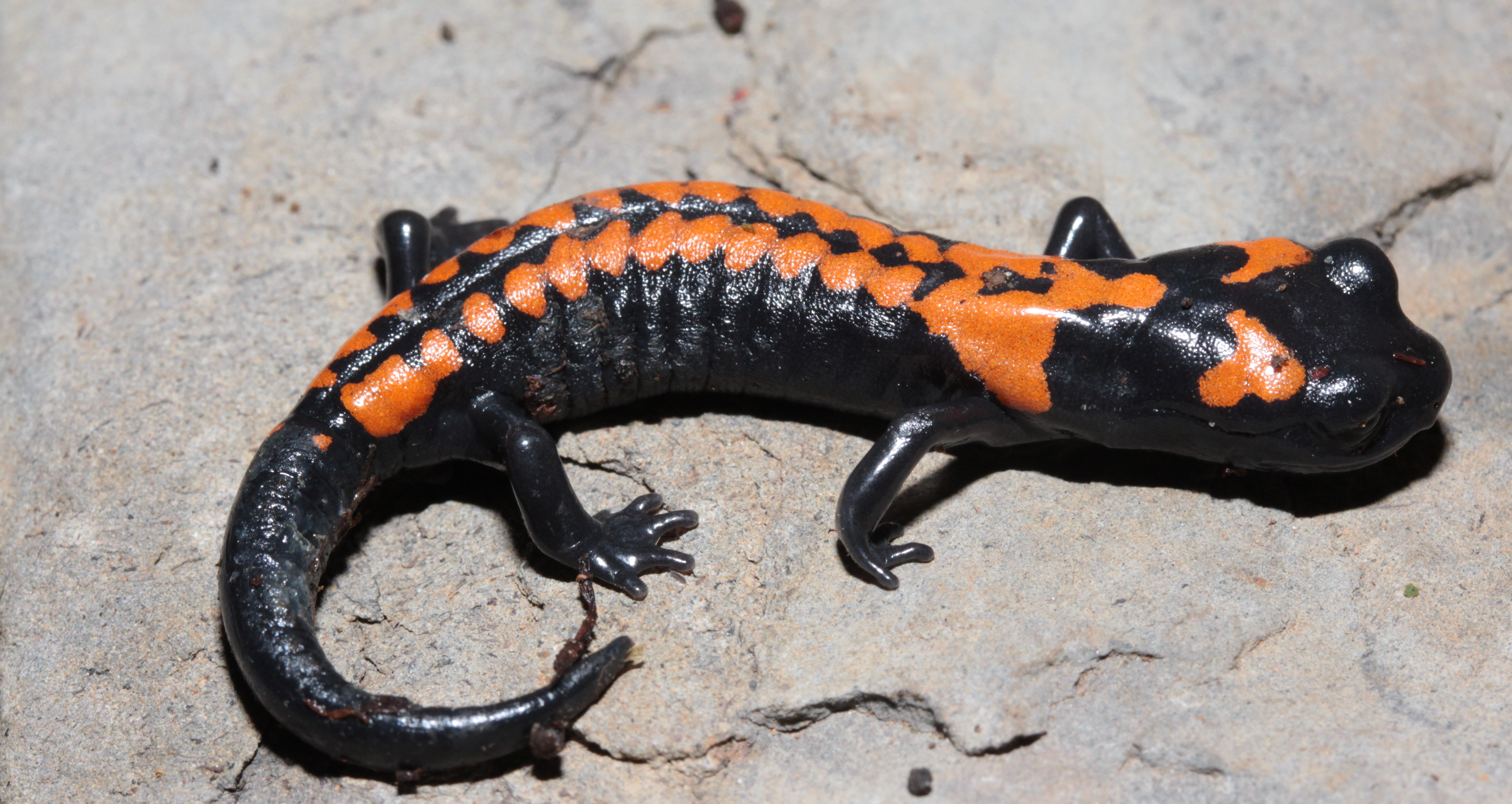
- Juvenile I. bellii

Conservation status
- Least Concern (IUCN 3.1)

Scientific classification
- Kingdom: Animalia
- Phylum: Chordata
- Class: Amphibia
- Order: Urodela
- Family: Plethodontidae
- Genus: Isthmura
- Species: I. bellii

Binomial name
- Isthmura bellii (Gray, 1850)

Synonyms
- Spelerpes bellii Gray, 1850; Pseudoeurycea bellii (Gray, 1850)

= Isthmura bellii =

Species of amphibian

Isthmura bellii, commonly known as Bell's false brook salamander or Bell's salamander, is a species of salamander in the family Plethodontidae. It is endemic to Mexico and occurs mostly along the western and southern margins of the Mexican Plateau, with isolated populations elsewhere.

== Habitat ==
Its natural habitats are pine and pine-oak forests at high elevation, as well as forest edges and grazed areas. It tolerates habitat modification and is also found in degraded forests, coffee plantations, rural gardens, and close to urbanized and highly disturbed areas. This terrestrial species is typically found beneath logs, rocks, waste timber, brush piles, and within leaf litter. Once common, this species has disappeared from many places. The reasons for this decline are unclear, although habitat loss is occurring throughout its range.

== Behavior ==
Isthmura bellii is terrestrial and nocturnal.

== Taxonomy ==
Isthmura bellii is a member of Plethodontidae, also known as the lungless salamanders. Some research indicates that Isthmura bellii is a species complex, meaning that there are multiple species grouped under this name with unresolved evolutionary relationships. Isthmura sierraoccidentalis was promoted from subspecies to species, creating this complication. Genetic analysis suggests there are many cryptic species within the Isthmura bellii group, and further genetic research will be needed to resolve these relationships.
