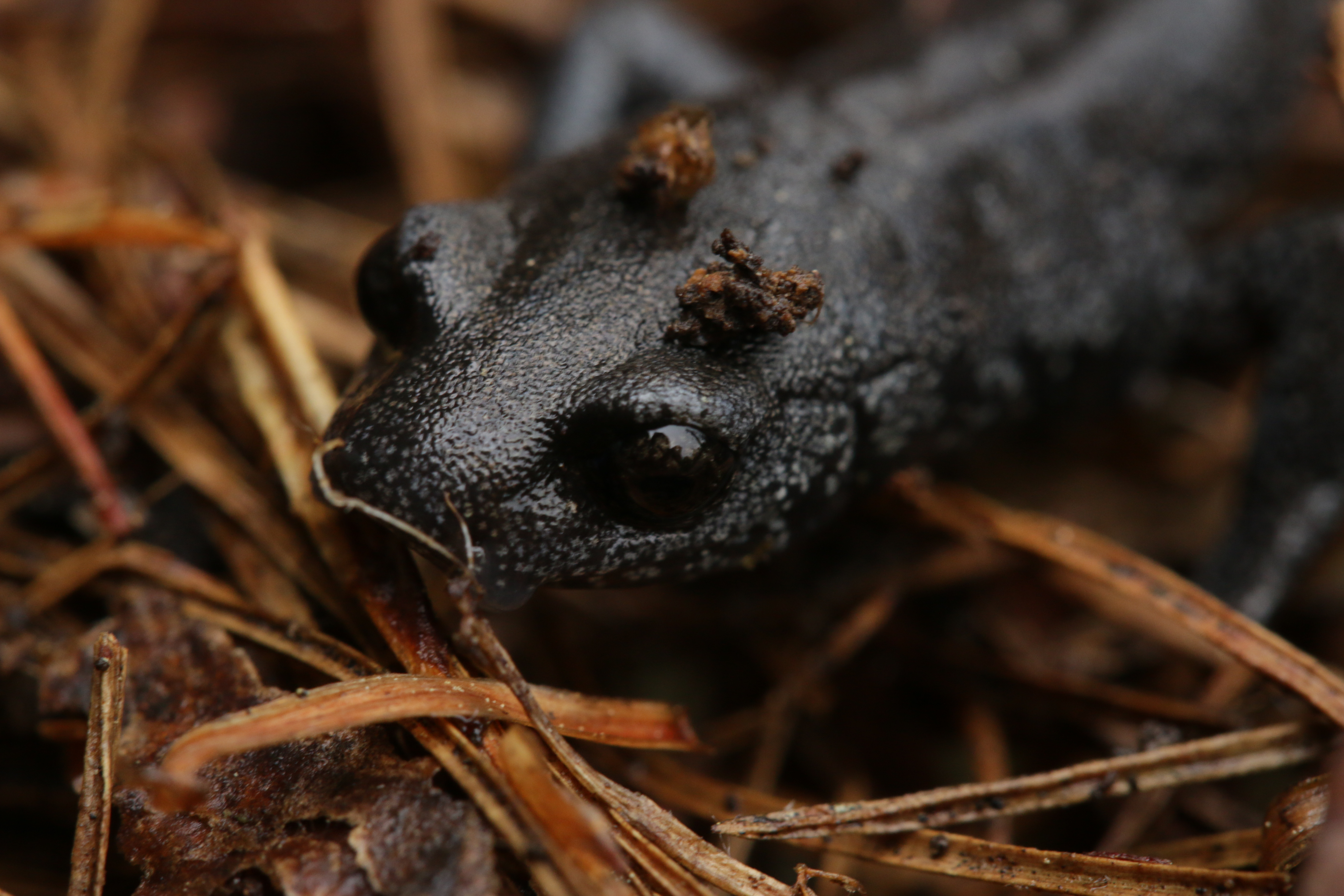

Conservation status
- Least Concern (IUCN 3.1)

Scientific classification
- Kingdom: Animalia
- Phylum: Chordata
- Class: Amphibia
- Order: Urodela
- Family: Plethodontidae
- Genus: Aquiloeurycea
- Species: A. cephalica

Binomial name
- Aquiloeurycea cephalica (Cope, 1865)

Synonyms
- Spelerpes cephalicus Cope, 1865; Pseudoeurycea cephalica (Cope, 1865)

= Aquiloeurycea cephalica =

Species of salamander

Aquiloeurycea cephalica is a species of salamander in the family Plethodontidae. It is endemic to central Mexico. It is a species complex.

Aquiloeurycea cephalica are found in pine, pine-oak, fir, and cloud forests, and in the upper extent of lowland forest. They are commonly encountered beneath rocks, logs and other debris on the ground. The species tolerates some habitat change and occurs in forest edges, rural gardens, and small patches of forest in urban areas. It is threatened by habitat loss.

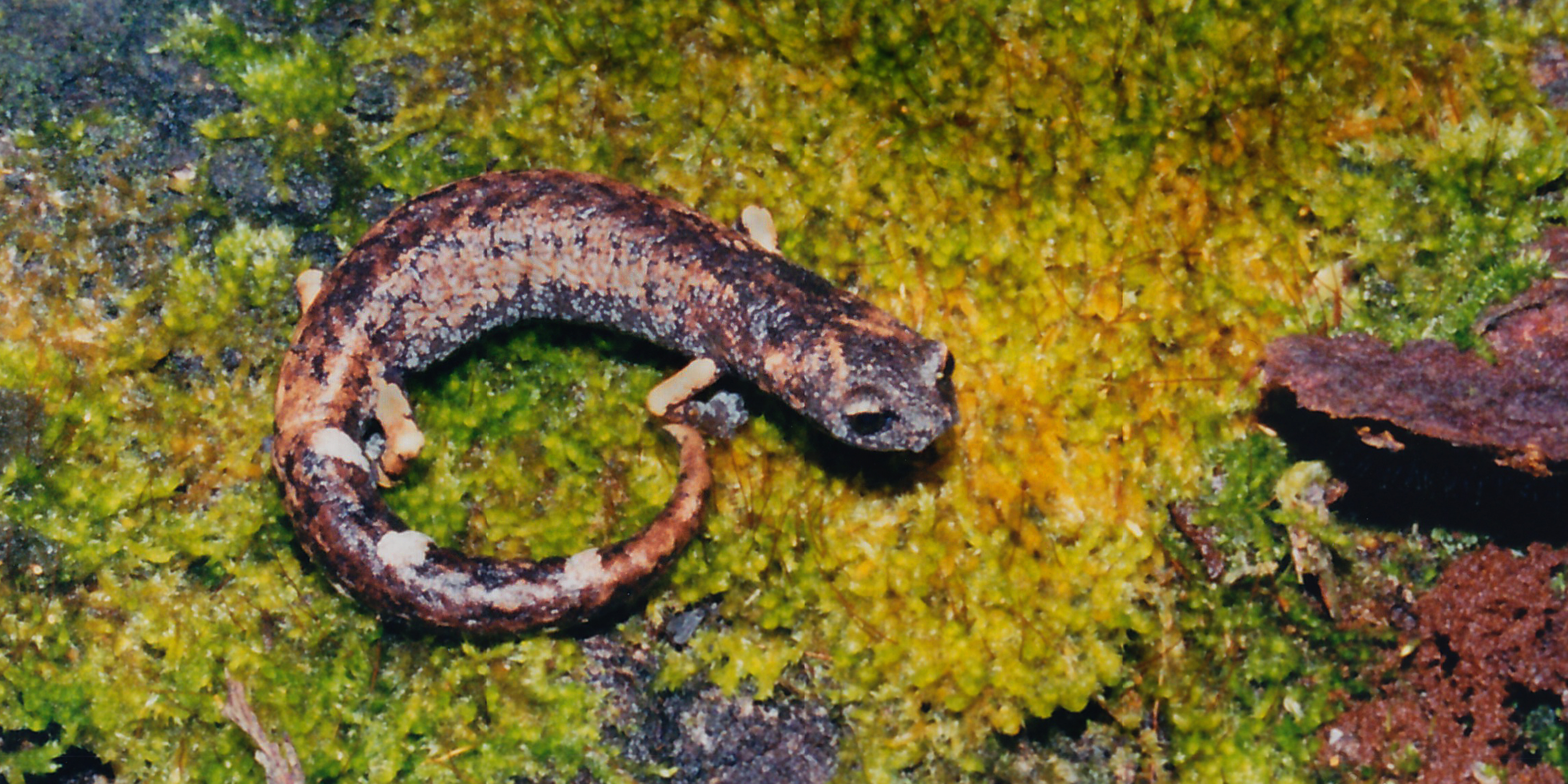
Chunky False Brook Salamander (Aquiloeurycea cephalica), El Cielo Biosphere Reserve, Municipality of Gómez Farías, Tamaulipas, Mexico (12 August 2004).
