= Gómez Farías Municipality, Tamaulipas =

Municipality in Tamaulipas, Mexico

Coordinates: 23°02′N 99°09′W

Gómez Farías
- Municipality
- Interactive map of Gómez Farías
- Country: Mexico
- State: Tamaulipas

Population (2010)
  - Municipality: 8,786
- Demonym: (in Spanish)
- Time zone: UTC−6 (CST)

Gómez Farías Municipality is situated in the Mexican state of Tamaulipas. The town of Gómez Farías serves as the municipal seat of government. Covering an area of 433 square kilometres (167 sq mi), Gómez Farías Municipality had a population of 8,786 as of 2010. The town of Gómez Farías, specifically, had a population of 883 in the same year. Additionally, within the municipal area, a portion of 23,124 hectares (57,140 acres) (equivalent to 231 square kilometers) is encompassed by the El Cielo Biosphere Reserve.

== History ==
In 1749, a settlement was established on the site of Gómez Farías to concentrate the semi-nomadic indigenous peoples of the area into a single community. On 10 January 1869, the municipality was created and named after Valentín Gómez Farías, a former President of Mexico.

== Geography ==
=== Climate ===
Most of the State of Tamaulipas is semi-arid and typically covered in a thorny scrub vegetation called Tamaulipan Mezquital. Gómez Farías and a few other areas on the eastern slopes of the Sierra Madre Oriental are the exception, with high precipitation and luxuriant vegetation. El Cielo Biosphere Reserve is the most northerly area in Mexico of tropical Veracruz moist forests. Temperate cloud forests are found at higher elevations.

Climate data for Gomez Farias, Tamaulipas. 23 03 N, 99 09W. Elevation: 327 metres (1,073 ft)
Month	Jan	Feb	Mar	Apr	May	Jun	Jul	Aug	Sep	Oct	Nov	Dec	Year
Mean daily maximum °C (°F)	22.5 (72.5)	24.7 (76.5)	28.3 (82.9)	30.9 (87.6)	32.2 (90.0)	32.2 (90.0)	31.7 (89.1)	32.3 (90.1)	30.8 (87.4)	28.7 (83.7)	25.9 (78.6)	22.9 (73.2)	28.6 (83.5)
Daily mean °C (°F)	17.3 (63.1)	19.1 (66.4)	22.3 (72.1)	24.9 (76.8)	26.7 (80.1)	27.0 (80.6)	26.8 (80.2)	27.1 (80.8)	26.0 (78.8)	23.9 (75.0)	20.9 (69.6)	18.9 (66.0)	23.3 (73.9)
Mean daily minimum °C (°F)	12.2 (54.0)	13.4 (56.1)	16.4 (61.5)	18.9 (66.0)	21.3 (70.3)	21.9 (71.4)	21.8 (71.2)	21.9 (71.4)	21.2 (70.2)	19.0 (66.2)	16.0 (60.8)	13.1 (55.6)	16.1 (61.0)
Average precipitation mm (inches)	31 (1.2)	30 (1.2)	47 (1.9)	77 (3.0)	172 (6.8)	323 (12.7)	365 (14.4)	270 (10.6)	289 (11.4)	153 (6.0)	50 (2.0)	39 (1.5)	1,847 (72.7)
Source: Weatherbase: Gomez Farias, Tamaulipas.

== Economy ==
Sugar cane, mostly grown with irrigation, is by far the most important agricultural product of the municipality. Cattle, citrus, and mango are also important. In the mountainous part of the municipality, maize is the principal crop, grown mostly by small-scale farmers. Gómez Farías attracts a sizable number of tourists, including bird watchers and botanists, to the El Cielo Biosphere Reserve and scenic areas along the Sabinas and Frio rivers.
