= Gabriela Parra-Olea =

Mexican herpetologist, researcher (born 1967)

- Born: 1967 (age 58–59); Mexico City
- Education: Metropolitan Autonomous University; University of California at Berkeley
- Occupations: Herpetologist, researcher
- Known for: Evolutionary biology, amphibian conservation

Gabriela Parra-Olea (born 1967) is a Mexican herpetologist and researcher in the Department of Zoology at the Institute of Biology at National Autonomous University of Mexico (UNAM). She has collaborated on the description of numerous new species of salamanders.

== Biography ==
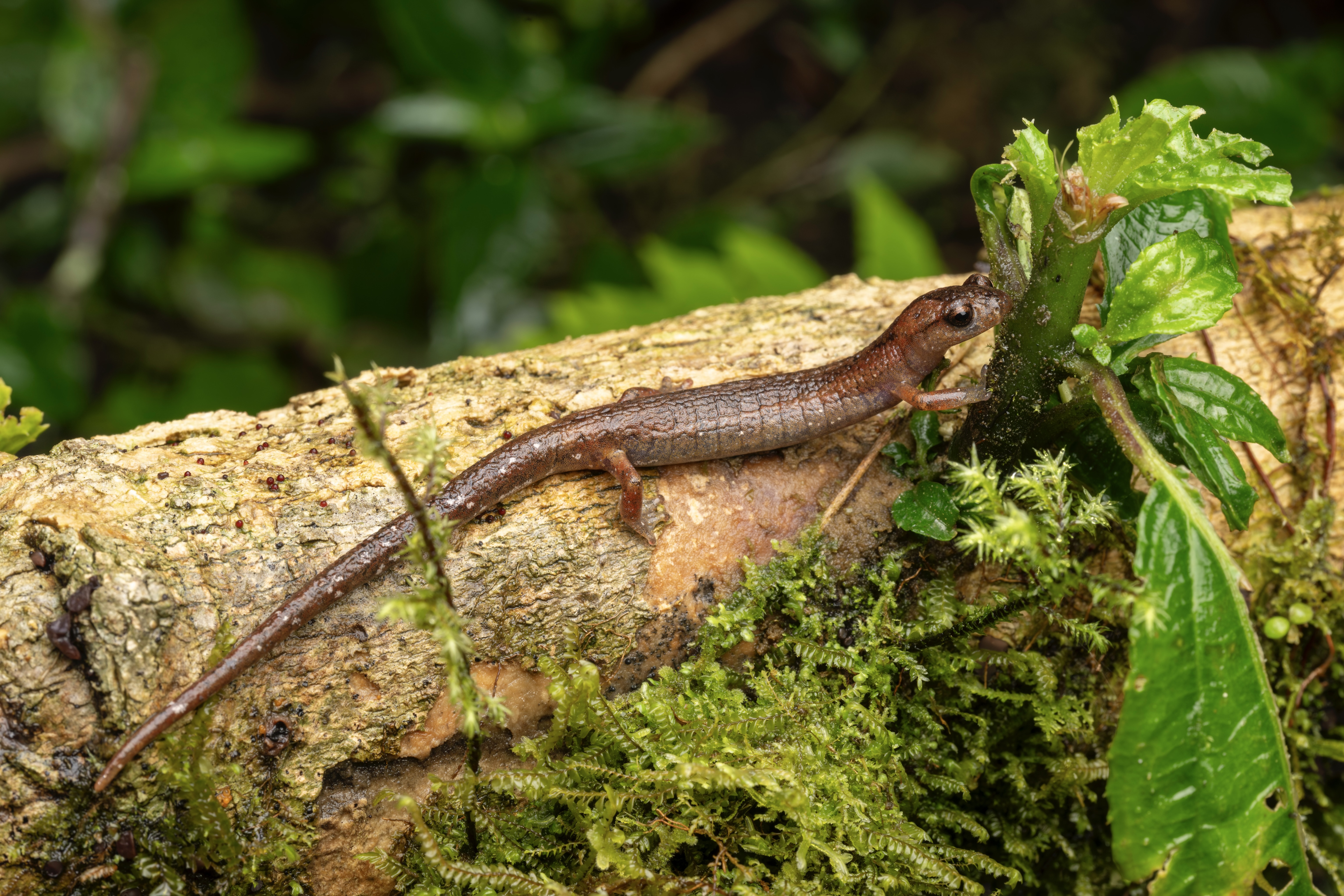
Bolitoglossa tica from Savegre Reserve, San José, Costa Rica (García-París, Parra-Olea & Wake, 2008)

Born in Mexico City, she earned her bachelor's degree in hydrobiology in 1989 from the Metropolitan Autonomous University and a PhD in Science in 1999 from the University of California at Berkeley, with her dissertation, Molecular Evolution and Systematics of Neotropical Salamanders (Caudata: Plethodontidae: Bolitoglossini), directed by David B. Wake. In 2000 and 2001, she completed a postdoctoral fellowship at Harvard University, continuing her research into the molecular systematics of neotropical salamanders, working under the supervision of James Hanken, director of the Museum of Comparative Zoology at Harvard University.

In August 2001, she joined the Institute of Biology at the National Autonomous University of Mexico, where she leads her own laboratory. She has also volunteered with the Amphibian Specialist Group (ASG).

== Research ==
Parra-Olea specializes in systematics, evolutionary biology, and amphibian conservation, with a special focus on salamanders. According to one source in 2011, "The phylogenetic hypotheses proposed by Dr. Parra have utilized the most modern methods of systematic analysis, including not only the use of morphological characters but also, importantly, molecular markers. The combination of both types of characters has even led her to recognize the existence of at least 30 other salamander species that are currently being described."

Her additional research concerns the conservation of Mexican amphibians. To do so, she created population genetics studies to lay the groundwork for the establishment of practical conservation policies. Then she added the goal of discovering why infectious diseases have caused a significant global decline in the amphibian population. She is working on disease detection measures.

== Selected awards ==
- 2010 National Prize in Natural Sciences

== Selected publications ==
- Parra Olea G, Garcia-Castillo MG, Rovito SM, Maisano JA, Hanken J, Wake DB. 2020. Descriptions of five new species of the salamander genus Chiropterotriton (Caudata: Plethodontidae) from eastern Mexico and the status of three currently recognized taxa. PeerJ 8:e8800 https://doi.org/10.7717/peerj.8800
- Basanta, MD, Byrne, AQ, Rosenblum, EB, Piovia‐Scott, J., & Parra‐Olea, G. (2020). Early presence of Batrachochytrium dendrobatidis in Mexico with a contemporary dominance of the global panzootic lineage. Molecular Ecology.
- Scheele, BC, Pasmans, F., Skerratt, L.F., Berger, L., Martel, A., Beukema, W., ... & De la Riva, I. (2020). Response to Comment on “Amphibian fungal panzootic causes catastrophic and ongoing loss of biodiversity.” Science, 367 (6484).
- Mendoza-Henao, AM, Arias, E., Townsend, JH, & Parra-Olea, G. (2020). Phylogeny-based species delimitation and integrative taxonomic revision of the Hyalinobatrachium fleischmanni species complex, with resurrection of H. viridissimum (Taylor, 1942). Systematics and Biodiversity, 18 (5), 464–484.
