= Webbed foot =

Animal feet with non-pathogenic interdigital webbing

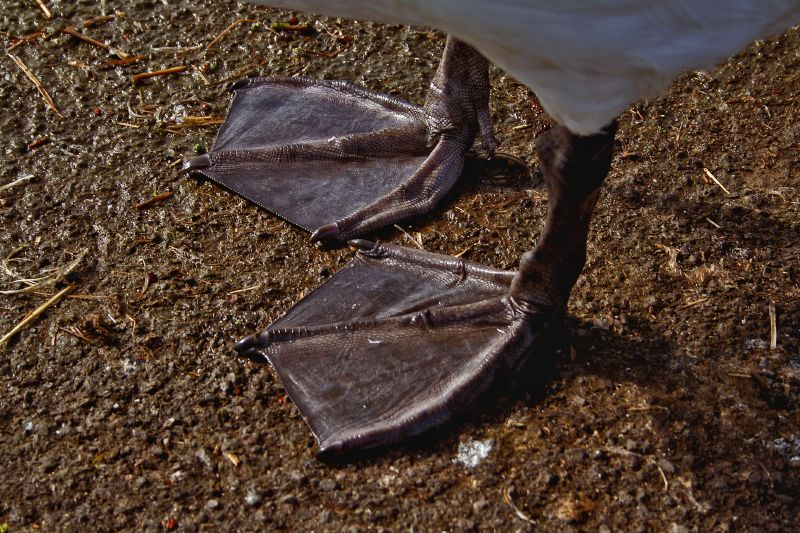
Webbed feet of a mute swan. Here, the delta (triangular) shape of the foot is clearly visible. This shape allows for the formation of leading edge vortices and lift-based propulsion during swimming.

The webbed foot is a specialized limb with interdigital membranes (webbings) that aids in aquatic locomotion, present in a variety of tetrapod vertebrates. This adaptation is primarily found in semiaquatic species, and has convergently evolved many times across vertebrate taxa.

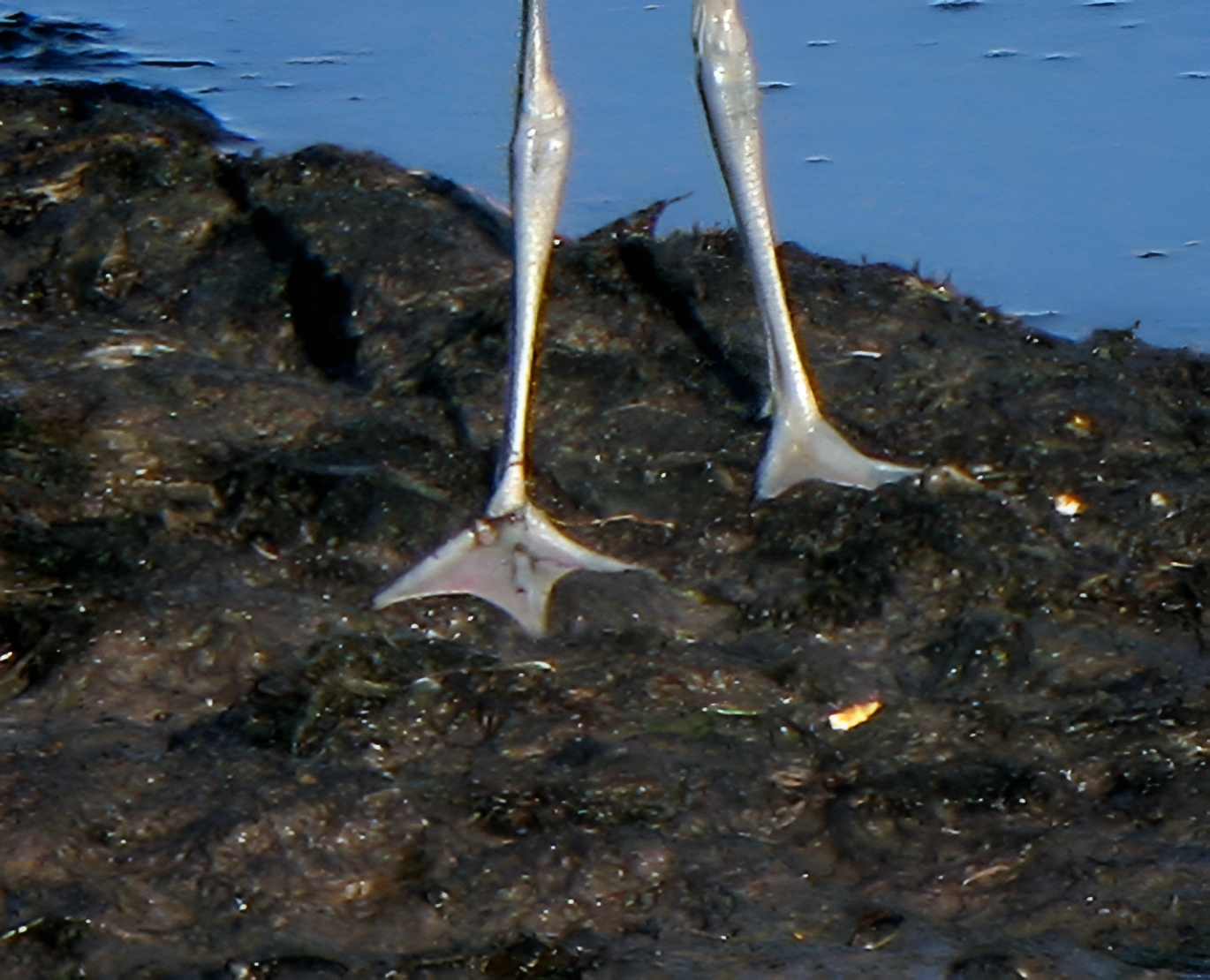
Unlike other waders, the pied avocet has webbed feet, and can swim well.

It likely arose from mutations in developmental genes that normally cause tissue between the digits to apoptose. These mutations were beneficial to many semiaquatic animals because the increased surface area from the webbing allowed for more swimming propulsion and swimming efficiency, especially in surface swimmers. The webbed foot also has enabled other novel behaviors like escape responses and mating behaviors. A webbed foot may also be called a paddle to contrast it from a more hydrofoil-like flipper.

== Morphology ==
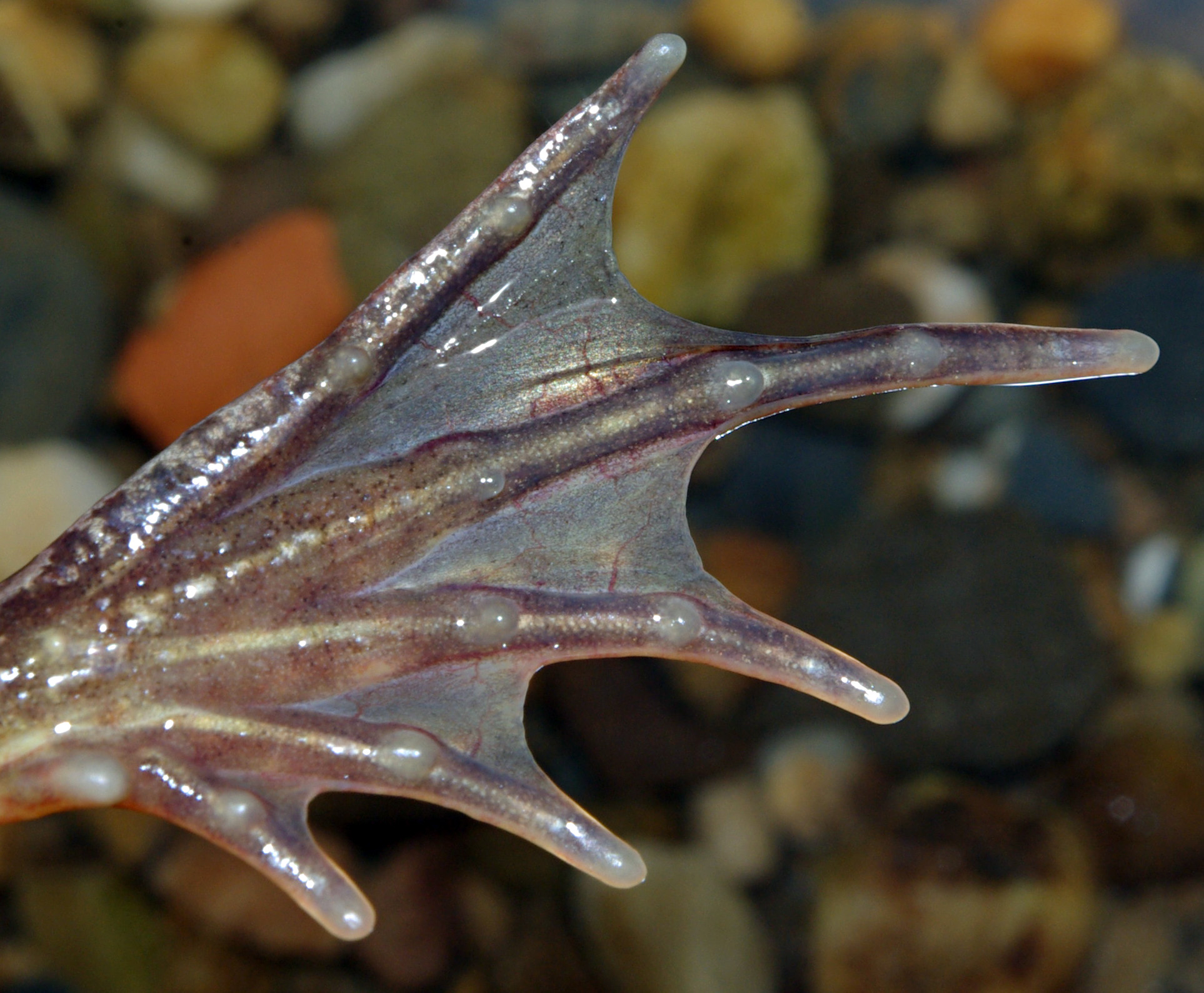
The webbed foot of Rana temporaria, the common frog. Here, the foot has a delta (triangular) shape that allows for the formation of leading edge vortices and likely increases swimming efficiency.

A webbed foot has connecting tissue between the toes of the foot. Several distinct conditions can give rise to webbed feet, including interdigital webbing and syndactyly. The webbing can consist of membrane, skin, or other connective tissue and varies widely in different taxa. This modification significantly increases the surface area of the feet. One of the consequences of this modification in some species, specifically birds, is that the feet are a major location for heat loss. In birds, the legs utilize countercurrent heat exchange so that blood reaching the feet is already cooled by blood returning to the heart to minimize this effect. Webbed feet take on a variety of different shapes; in birds, the webbing can even be discontinuous, as seen in lobate-footed birds like grebes. However, one of the most common is the delta (Δ) or triangular shape seen in most waterfowl and frogs. This delta wing shape is a solution that has convergently evolved in many taxa, and is also used in aircraft to allow for high lift forces at high attack angles. This shape allows for the production of large forces during swimming through both drag-based and lift-based propulsion.

Webbed feet are a compromise between aquatic and terrestrial locomotion. Aquatic control surfaces of non-piscine vertebrates may be paddles or hydrofoils. Paddles generate less lift than hydrofoils, and paddling is associated with drag-based control surfaces. The roughly triangular design of webbed feet, with a broad distal end, is specialized to increase propulsive efficiency by affecting a larger mass of water over generating increased lift. This is in contrast to a more hydrofoil-like flipper of many permanently aquatic animals.

== Evolution ==
=== Development ===
Webbed feet are the result of mutations in genes that normally cause interdigital tissue between the toes to apoptose. Apoptosis, or programmed cell death, in development is mediated by a variety of pathways, and normally causes the creation of digits by death of tissue separating the digits. Different vertebrate species with webbed feet have different mutations that disrupt this process, indicating that the structure arose independently in these lineages.

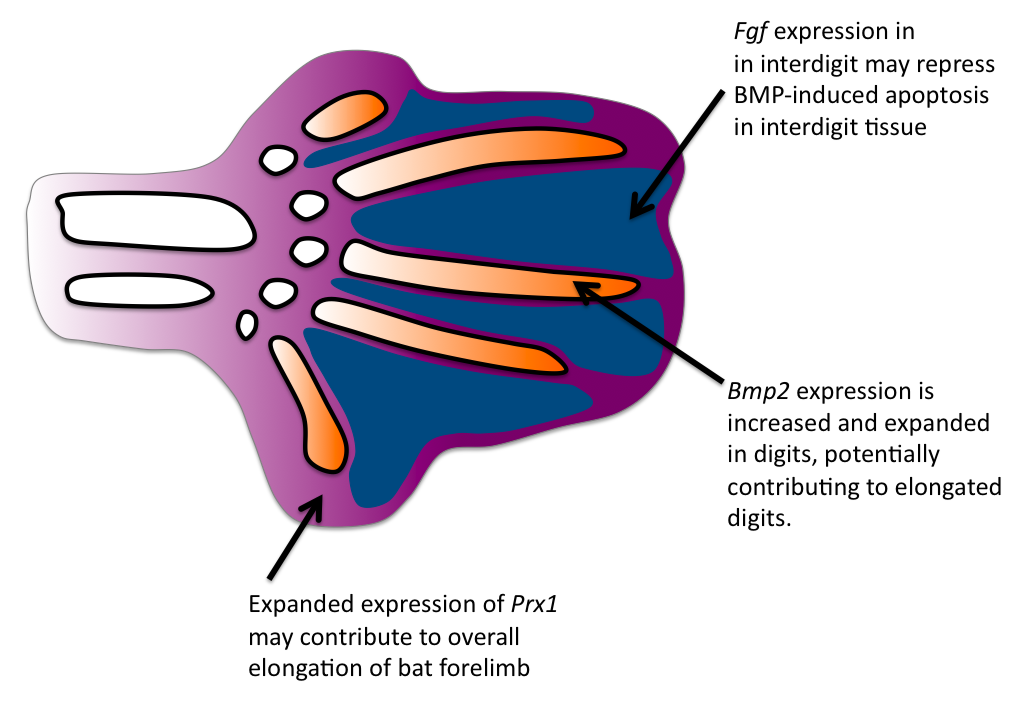
Bats have also developed interdigital webbing for flight. Reductions in the BMP-induced apoptosis likely allowed this trait to arise.

In humans, syndactyly can arise from as many as nine unique subtypes with their own clinical, morphological, and genetic fingerprints. In addition, the same genetic mutations can underlie different phenotypic expressions of syndactyly. While these conditions are disorders in humans, the variability in genetic cause of webbed digits informs our understanding of how this morphological change arose in species where webbed feet were selectively advantageous. These conditions also demonstrate a variety of genetic targets for mutation resulting in webbed feet, which may explain how this homologous structure could have arisen many times over the course of evolutionary history.

One pathway implicated in interdigital necrosis is the bone morphogenetic protein (BMP) signaling pathway. BMP signaling molecules (BMPs) are expressed in the tissue regions between digits during development. In experiments with chickens, mutations to a BMP receptor disrupted the apoptosis of interdigital tissue and caused webbed feet similar to ducks to develop. In ducks, BMPs are not expressed at all. These results indicate that in avian lineages, the disruption of BMP signaling in interdigital tissue caused webbed feet to arise. The magnitude of attenuation in this pathway is correlated with the amount of interdigital tissue preserved. Other genetic changes implicated in webbed feet development in avians include reduction of TGFβ-induced chondrogenesis and reduction of msx-1 and msx-2 gene expression.

Webbed feet could also arise due to being linked to other morphological changes, without a selective advantage. In salamanders, webbed feet have arisen in multiple lineages, but in most do not contribute to increased function. However, in the cave salamander species Chiropterotriton magnipes (bigfoot splayfoot salamander), their webbed feet are morphologically unique from other salamanders and may serve a functional purpose. This demonstrates that webbed feet arise from developmental changes, but do not necessarily correlate with a selective advantage functionally.

=== Phylogeny ===
Webbed feet have arisen in all major vertebrate lineages with limbed animals. Most webbed-footed species spend part of their time in aquatic environments, indicating that this homologous structure provides some advantage to swimmers. Some examples from each class are highlighted here, but this is not a complete listing.

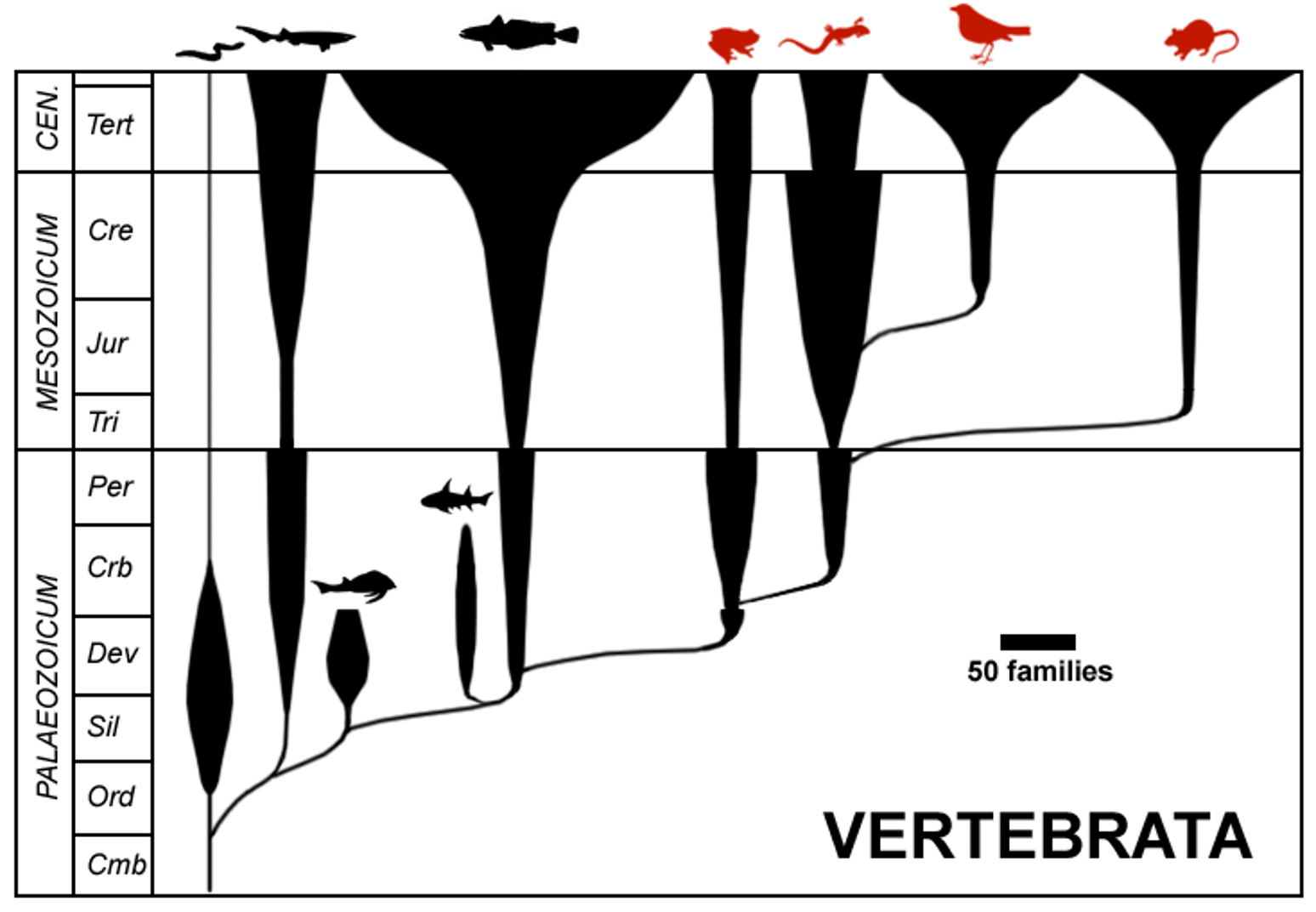
A phylogenetic tree of vertebrate taxa. The classes highlighted in red contain species with webbed feet. In all these cases, webbed feet arose homologously and independently of other classes through convergent evolution.

==== Amphibians ====
Of the three orders of amphibians, Anura (frogs and toads) and Urodela (salamanders) have representative species with webbed feet. Frogs that live in aquatic environments, like the common frog (Rana temporaria), have webbed feet. Salamanders in arboreal and cave environments also have webbed feet, but in most species, this morphological change does not likely have a functional advantage.

==== Reptiles ====
Reptiles have webbed-footed representatives that include freshwater turtles and geckos. While turtles with webbed feet are aquatic, most geckos live in terrestrial and arboreal environments.

==== Birds ====
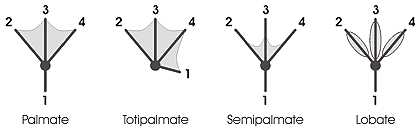
Webbing and lobation in a bird's right foot

Birds are typically classified as a sub-group of reptiles, but they are a distinct class within vertebrates, so are discussed separately. Birds have a wide span of representatives with webbed feet, due to the diversity of waterfowl. Ducks, geese, and swans all have webbed feet. They utilize different foraging behaviors in water, but use similar modes of locomotion. There is a wide variety of webbing and lobation styles in bird feet, including birds with all digits joined in webbing, like the Brandt's cormorant and birds with lobed digits, like grebes. Palmations and lobes enable swimming or help walking on loose ground such as mud. Penguins are notable for being the only birds (as well as animals in general) with both webbed feet and flippers (they have 2 each). The webbed or palmated feet of birds can be categorized into several types:

- Palmate: only the anterior digits (2–4) are joined by webbing. Found in ducks, geese and swans, gulls and terns, and other aquatic birds (penguins, auks, flamingos, fulmars, jaegers, loons, petrels, shearwaters and skimmers). Diving ducks also have a lobed hind toe (1), and gulls, terns and allies have a reduced hind toe.
- Totipalmate: all four digits (1–4) are joined by webbing. Found in gannets and boobies, pelicans, cormorants, anhingas, frigatebirds, and tropicbirds. Some gannets have brightly colored feet used in display.
- Semipalmate: a small web between the anterior digits (2–4). Found in some plovers (Eurasian dotterels) and sandpipers (semipalmated sandpipers, stilt sandpipers, upland sandpipers, greater yellowlegs and willet), avocet, herons (only two toes), magpie geese, screamers, all grouse, and some domesticated breeds of chicken. Plovers and lapwings have a vestigial hind toe (1), and sandpipers and their allies have a reduced and raised hind toe barely touching the ground. The sanderling is the only sandpiper having 3 toes (tridactyl foot).
- Lobate: the anterior digits (2–4) are edged with lobes of skin. Lobes expand or contract when a bird swims. In grebes, coots, phalaropes, finfoots and some palmate-footed ducks on the hallux (1). Grebes have more webbing between the toes than coots and phalaropes.

The palmate foot is most common.

==== Mammals ====
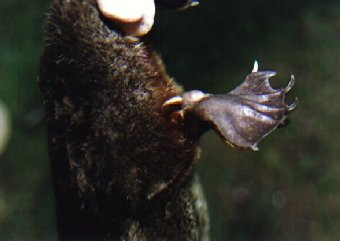
Platypus foot

Some semiaquatic mammals have webbed feet. Most of these have interdigital webbing, as opposed to the syndactyly found in birds. Some notable examples include the platypus, the beaver, the otter, and the water opossum. Capybaras have slightly webbed feet, while hippopotamuses have webbed toes.

== Function ==
=== Swimming propulsion ===
In many species, webbed feet likely evolved to aid in generation of propulsion during swimming. Most webbed-footed animals utilize paddling modes of locomotion where their feet stroke backwards relative to their whole body motion, generating a propulsive force. The interdigital membrane increases the surface area, which increases the propulsive drag the animal can generate with each stroke of its foot. This is a drag-based mode of propulsion. However, some waterfowl also utilize lift-based modes of propulsion, where their feet generate hydrodynamic lift due to the angle of attack of the foot and the relative water velocity. For example, great-crested grebes use solely lift-based propulsion due to their lateral foot stroke and asymmetric, lobated toes. Most waterfowl use a combination of these two modes of propulsion, where the first third of their foot stroke generates propulsive drag and the last two-thirds of the stroke generates propulsive lift.

The stroke of the foot through the water also generates vortices that aid propulsion. During the transition from drag-based to lift-based propulsion in ducks, leading edge vortices formed on the front of the foot are shed, which creates a flow of water over the foot that likely aids lift production. Other species also create these vortices during their webbed foot stroke. Frogs also create vortices that shed off their feet when swimming in water. The vortices from the two feet do not interfere with each other; therefore, each foot is generating forward propulsion independently.

Most fully aquatic vertebrates do not use paddling modes of locomotion, instead using undulatory modes of locomotion or flipper locomotion. Fully aquatic mammals and animals typically have flippers instead of webbed feet, which are a more heavily specialized and modified limb. It is hypothesized that an evolutionary transition between semiaquatic and fully aquatic higher vertebrates (especially mammals) involved both the specialization of swimming limbs and the transition to underwater, undulatory modes of motion. However, for semiaquatic animals that mainly swim at the surface, webbed feet are highly functional; they trade-off effectively between efficient terrestrial and aquatic locomotion. In addition, some waterfowl can also use paddling modes for underwater swimming, with added propulsion from flapping their wings. Diving ducks can swim underwater to forage. These ducks expend more than 90% of their energy to overcome their own buoyancy when they dive. They can also achieve higher speeds underwater due to surface speeds being limited to their hull speed; at this speed, the wave drag increases to the point where the duck cannot swim faster.

=== Other behaviors ===
In ducks, webbed feet have also enabled extreme forms of propulsion that are used for escape behaviors and courtship display. Surface swimmers are speed-limited due to increasing drag as they approach a physically defined hull speed, which is determined by their body length. In order to achieve speeds higher than hull speed, some ducks, like eider ducks, use distinctive modes of locomotion that involve lifting the body out of the water. They can hydroplane, where they lift part of their body out of the water and paddle with their webbed feet to generate forces that allow them to overcome gravity; they also use paddle-assisted flying, where the whole body is lifted out of the water, and the wings and feet work in concert to generate lift forces. In extreme cases, this type of behavior is used for sexual selection. Western and Clark's grebes utilize their lobated feet to generate nearly 50% of the force required to allow them to walk on water in elaborate sexual displays; they are likely the largest animal to "walk" on water, and are an order of magnitude heavier than the well-known lizards that exhibit a similar behavior.

==== Terrestrial locomotion ====
While webbed feet have mainly arisen in swimming species, they can also aid in terrestrial locomotors by increasing contact area on slick or soft surfaces. For P. rangei, the Namib sand gecko, their webbed feet may serve as sand shoes that enable them to move atop sand dunes. However, some ecologists believe that their webbed feet do not aid aboveground locomotion, but are mainly utilized as shovels for burrowing and digging in the sand. In salamanders, most species do not benefit from the increased surface area of their feet. However, some, like the bigfoot splayfoot salamander (Chiropterotriton magnipes) increase their body size to foot surface area ratio enough to provide increased suction. This species lives in cave environments where they often encounter wet, slick surfaces. Therefore, their webbed feet may enable them to move on these surfaces with ease.

== See also ==
- Webbed toes
- Interdigital webbing
- Syndactyly
- Bird feet and legs
- Tradeoffs for locomotion in air and water
