= NKX3-3 =

Gene

NK3 homeobox 3, also known as NKX3-3, zax, bagpipe homeobox or zampogna is a paralogous gene of NKX3-2. It is named after the italian instrument called zampogna. NKX3-3 is not present in the human genome.

== Function ==
NKX3-3 is a homeodomain transcription factor. It plays a role in the development of the larval skeleton of anuran tadpoles. A knockdown of this NKX3-2 related homeobox gene in Xenopus laevis causes fatal head deformation, disappearing of jaw cartilages and shifted muscular insertions.
