= Chignahuapan splayfoot salamander =

Conservation status
- Vulnerable (IUCN 3.1)

Scientific classification
- Kingdom: Animalia
- Phylum: Chordata
- Class: Amphibia
- Order: Urodela
- Family: Plethodontidae
- Genus: Chiropterotriton
- Species: C. orculus

Binomial name
- Chiropterotriton orculus (Cope, 1865)

Synonyms
- Spelerpes orculus Cope, 1865

Species of amphibian

The Chignahuapan splayfoot salamander (Chiropterotriton orculus), also known as Cope's flat-footed salamander, is a species of salamander in the family Plethodontidae. It is endemic to Mexico and known from the southern and eastern margins of the Mexican Plateau between northern Morelos and northern Puebla. It was removed from the synonymy of Chiropterotriton chiropterus in 1994; unnamed species may also exist in this species complex.

Its natural habitats are pine-oak and fir forests; it tolerates some habitat modification. It is a relatively common, terrestrial species. It is threatened by habitat loss caused by logging and human settlement.
