= Cave splayfoot salamander =

Conservation status
- Critically Endangered (IUCN 3.1)

Scientific classification
- Kingdom: Animalia
- Phylum: Chordata
- Class: Amphibia
- Order: Urodela
- Family: Plethodontidae
- Genus: Chiropterotriton
- Species: C. mosaueri

Binomial name
- Chiropterotriton mosaueri (Woodall, 1941)

Species of amphibian

The cave splayfoot salamander (Chiropterotriton mosaueri) is a species of salamander in the family Plethodontidae. It is endemic to Mexico, specifically in the Sierra Madre Oriental pine–oak forests of the northern region of Hidalgo, Mexico. The species was thought to be extinct for over 70 years since its first observation and a study of five salamanders made by Robert Livingston and Harold T. Woodall in 1937. In 2010, this species was spotted for the first time since its 1941 description by Dr. Sean Rovito who identified two individuals during his search for other lost amphibian species.

When preserved in alcohol they found the specimens had an overall dark brown coloration with a light tan underbelly. Features of interest were their webbed "spatulate" feet, number of costal grooves (12–13) and tails which were slightly longer in length than the head and body combined. Their proportionally longer limbs, shorter heads, and large quantity of vomerine teeth set them apart from other species of Chiropterotriton. Their natural habitat is believed to be damp caves where they were initially discovered, however the exact locations are unknown. They are threatened by habitat loss due to deforestation and the expansion of agriculture in the region which causes the caves to become dry.

The cave splayfoot salamander and the bigfoot splayfoot salamander (Chiropterotriton magnipes) are considered to be sympatric since both are rare species and observed in the same cave.
