= Toothy splayfoot salamander =

Conservation status
- Endangered (IUCN 3.1)

Scientific classification
- Kingdom: Animalia
- Phylum: Chordata
- Class: Amphibia
- Order: Urodela
- Family: Plethodontidae
- Genus: Chiropterotriton
- Species: C. multidentatus

Binomial name
- Chiropterotriton multidentatus (Taylor, 1939)

Synonyms
- Oedipus multidentatus Taylor, 1939 "1938"

Species of amphibian

The toothy splayfoot salamander (Chiropterotriton multidentatus), also known as the toothy salamander, is a species of salamander in the family Plethodontidae. It is endemic to Mexico and known from the Sierra Madre Oriental of southeastern Hidalgo, Tlaxcala, and south-central San Luis Potosí, at elevations of 1,070–2,440 m (3,510–8,010 ft) asl.

Its natural habitats are pine and pine-oak forests. It is an arboreal species living in bromeliads, and also in crevices. The species is declining, and can no longer be found at its type locality in San Luis Potosí. Reasons for the decline are unknown, but habitat loss is likely involved.
