= Chiropterotriton casasi =

Conservation status
- Critically Endangered (IUCN 3.1)

Scientific classification
- Kingdom: Animalia
- Phylum: Chordata
- Class: Amphibia
- Order: Urodela
- Family: Plethodontidae
- Genus: Chiropterotriton
- Species: C. casasi

Binomial name
- Chiropterotriton casasi Parra-Olea, García-Castillo, Rovito, Maisano, Hanken & Wake, 2020

Species of amphibian

Chiropterotriton casasi, also known as the Tlapacoyan salamander, is a species of salamander in the family Plethodontidae. It was last seen in 1969, and is possibly extinct.

== Taxonomy ==
The Tlapacoyan salamander was first described in 2020, and was given its specific name in honor of Mexican herpetologist Gustavo Casas Andreu.

== Description ==
Tlapacoyan salamanders are large salamanders for their genus, being an average of 35-40mm long. Females are slightly larger than males. They are stout-bodied, have long, slender legs, and are a mottled brown color.

== Habitat and Distribution ==
The Tlapacoyan salamander is only known from its type locality, southwest of Tlapacoyan, Veracruz, Mexico. At the time they were discovered, their habitat consisted primarily of cloud forest, though it has since been mostly destroyed.

== History ==
Only five specimens, four males and one female, of Tlapacoyan salamanders have been recorded. All were collected in 1969 by herpetologist Ronald Altig. Searches at the species' type locality have failed to find any more individuals. The species was described in 2020, and listed as critically endangered and possibly extinct by the IUCN.
