= Chondrogenesis =

Biological process of cartilage development

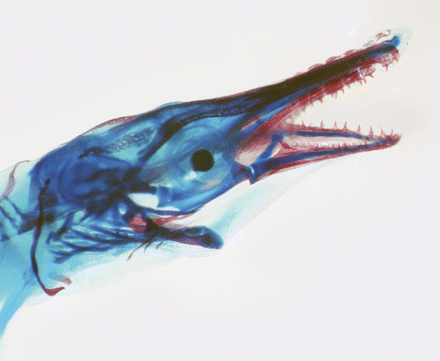
A spotted gar larva at 22 days stained for cartilage (blue) and bone (red)

Chondrogenesis is the biological process through which cartilage tissue, known as chondrocytes, is formed and developed. This intricate and tightly regulated cellular differentiation pathway plays a crucial role in skeletal development, as cartilage serves as a fundamental component of the embryonic skeleton. Chondrogenesis occurs when mesenchymal cells condense, differentiate into chondroprogenitor cells, and form into chondrocytes. These chondrocytes will either stay in their current state and become articular cartilage or they will enter a process called endochondral ossification where the cells will proliferate, undergo hypertrophic differentiation, and eventually apoptosis. The resulting hypertrophic cartilage is then replaced by bone tissue.

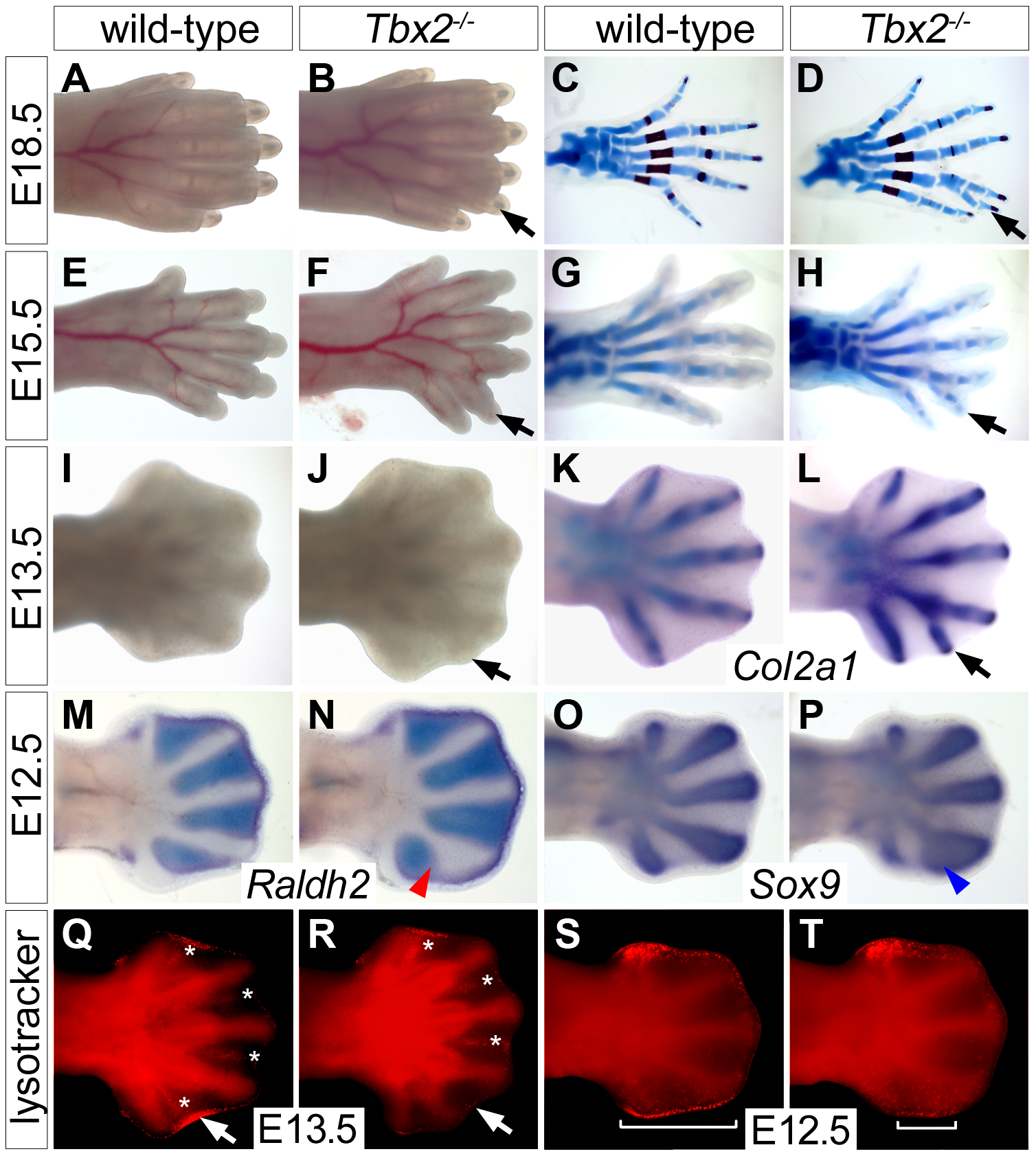
Duplication of digit 4 is preceded by reduced apoptosis and expanded chondrogenesis in the posterior limb mesenchyme

The term "chondrogenesis" is derived from the Greek words "chondros," meaning cartilage, and "genesis," meaning origin or formation.

== Biological processes of cartilage development ==
=== Embyronic and fetal development ===
In embryogenesis, the skeletal system is derived from the mesoderm and ectoderm germ layers. Chondrification (also known as chondrogenesis) is the process by which cartilage is formed from condensed mesenchyme tissue, which differentiates into chondrocytes and begins secreting the molecules that form the extracellular matrix.

Early in fetal development, the greater part of the skeleton is cartilaginous. This temporary cartilage is gradually replaced by bone (endochondral ossification), a process that ends at puberty. In contrast, the cartilage in the joints remains unossified during the whole of life and is, therefore, permanent. While in early life, cell-cell adhesion is mediated by molecules like N-cadherin, in later stages adhesion is mediated by interactions with the extracellular matrix (ECM). These cell-matrix interactions are essential for cartilage development.

=== Mineralization of articular cartilage ===
Adult hyaline articular cartilage is progressively mineralized at the junction between cartilage and bone. It is then termed articular calcified cartilage. A mineralization front advances through the base of the hyaline articular cartilage at a rate dependent on cartilage load and shear stress. Intermittent variations in the rate of advance and mineral deposition density of the mineralizing front, lead to multiple "tidemarks" in the articular calcified cartilage.

In adults, the calcified zone of articular cartilage is adjacent to the subchondral bone and exhibits similarities to endochondral ossification. Although adult articular cartilage is avascular, blood vessels invade the adjacent subchondral bone, where new bone is actively deposited. While similar to endochondral ossification, this process lacks the zonal organization of the growth cartilage. A cement line demarcates articular calcified cartilage from subchondral bones.

=== Cartilage Regeneration ===
Once damaged, cartilage has limited repair capabilities. Because chondrocytes are bound in lacunae, they cannot migrate to damaged areas. Also, because hyaline cartilage does not have a blood supply, the deposition of new matrix is slow. Damaged hyaline cartilage is usually replaced by fibrocartilage scar tissue.

Studies involving the dynamic compressive loading of bone marrow-derived mesenchymal stem cells (MSCs) have been central to understanding how mechanical stimuli can induce chondrogenic differentiation. Dynamic loading combined with the presence of growth factors has been seen to enhance MSC chondrogenic differentiation. This conversion of external mechanical forces into internal cellular responses is known as mechanotransduction.

In a 1994 trial, Swedish doctors repaired damaged knee joints by implanting cells cultured from the patient's own cartilage. In 1999, US chemists created an artificial liquid cartilage for use in repairing torn tissue. The cartilage is injected into a wound or damaged joint and will harden with exposure to ultraviolet light.

== Synthetic cartilage ==
Researchers say their lubricating layers of "molecular brushes" can outperform nature under the highest pressures encountered within joints, with potentially important implications for joint replacement surgery. Each 60-nanometre-long brush filament has a polymer backbone from which small molecular groups stick out. Those synthetic groups are very similar to the lipids found in cell membranes.

"In a watery environment, each of these molecular groups attracts up to 25 water molecules through electrostatic forces, so the filament as a whole develops a slick watery sheath. These sheathes ensure that the brushes are lubricated as they rub past each other, even when firmly pressed together to mimic the pressures at bone joints."

Known as double-network hydrogels, the incredible strength of these new materials was a happy surprise when first discovered by researchers at Hokkaido in 2003. Most conventionally prepared hydrogels - materials that are 80 to 90 percent water held in a polymer network - easily break apart like a gelatin. The Japanese team serendipitously discovered that the addition of a second polymer to the gel made them so tough that they rivaled cartilage - tissue which can withstand the abuse of hundreds of pounds of pressure.

== Molecular level ==
Bone morphogenetic proteins are growth factors released during embryonic development to induce condensation and determination of cells, during chondrogenesis. Noggin, a developmental protein, inhibits chondrogenesis by preventing condensation and differentiation of mesenchymal cells.

The molecule sonic hedgehog (Shh) modifies the activation of the L-Sox5, Sox6, Sox9 and Nkx3.2. Sox9 and Nkx3.2 induce each other in a positive feedback loop where Nkx3.2 inactivates a Sox9 inhibitor. This loop is supported by BMP expression. The expression of Sox9 induces the expression of BMP, which causes chondrocytes to proliferate and differentiate.

L-Sox5 and Sox6 share this common role with Sox9. L-Sox5 and Sox6 are thought to induce the activation of the Col2a1 and the Col11a2 genes, and to repress the expression of Cbfa1, a marker for late stage Chondrocytes. L-Sox5 is also thought to be involved primarily in embryonic chondrogenesis, while Sox6 is thought to be involved in post-natal chondrogenesis.

The molecule Indian hedgehog (Ihh) is expressed by prehypertrophic chondrocytes. Ihh stimulates chondrocyte proliferation and regulates chondrocyte maturation by maintaining the expression of PTHrP. PTHrP acts as a patterning molecule, determining the position in which the chondrocytes initiate differentiation.

Research is still ongoing and novel transcription factors, such as ATOH8 and EBF1, are added to the list of genes that regulate chondrogenesis.

== Sulfation ==
The SLC26A2 gene is a sulfate transporter. Defects in the gene result in several forms of osteochondrodysplasia.
