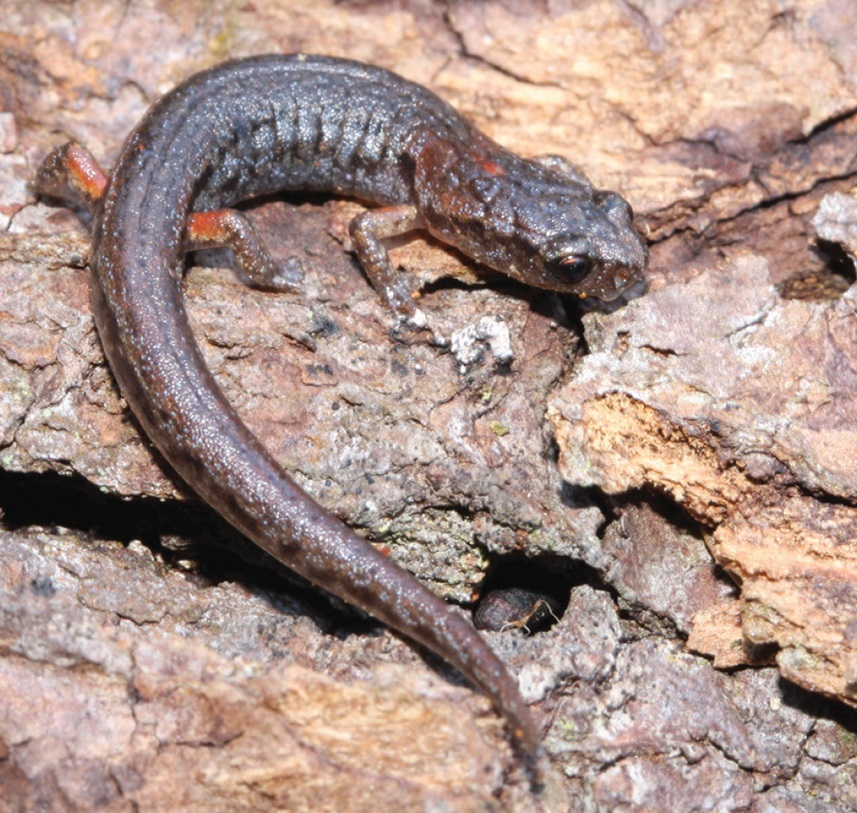

Conservation status
- Vulnerable (IUCN 3.1)

Scientific classification
- Kingdom: Animalia
- Phylum: Chordata
- Class: Amphibia
- Order: Urodela
- Family: Plethodontidae
- Genus: Chiropterotriton
- Species: C. dimidiatus

Binomial name
- Chiropterotriton dimidiatus (Taylor, 1940)1939

Synonyms
- Bolitoglossa dimidiata Taylor, 1940 "1939"

= Dwarf splayfoot salamander =

Species of amphibian

The dwarf splayfoot salamander (Chiropterotriton dimidiatus), also known as the dwarf flat-footed salamander, is a species of salamander in the family Plethodontidae. It is endemic to southern Hidalgo, Mexico.

Its natural habitats are pine-oak and fir forests. It is threatened by habitat loss.
