= Gristle-headed splayfoot salamander =

Conservation status
- Endangered (IUCN 3.1)

Scientific classification
- Kingdom: Animalia
- Phylum: Chordata
- Class: Amphibia
- Order: Urodela
- Family: Plethodontidae
- Genus: Chiropterotriton
- Species: C. chondrostega

Binomial name
- Chiropterotriton chondrostega Taylor, 1941

Species of amphibian

The gristle-headed splayfoot salamander (Chiropterotriton chondrostega) is a species of salamander in the family Plethodontidae. It is endemic to the Sierra Madre Oriental of east-central Mexico.

Its natural habitat is subtropical or tropical moist montane forests. It is threatened by habitat loss.
