= Arboreal splayfoot salamander =

Conservation status
- Critically Endangered (IUCN 3.1)

Scientific classification
- Kingdom: Animalia
- Phylum: Chordata
- Class: Amphibia
- Order: Urodela
- Family: Plethodontidae
- Genus: Chiropterotriton
- Species: C. arboreus

Binomial name
- Chiropterotriton arboreus (Taylor, 1941)

Synonyms
- Bolitoglossa arborea Taylor, 1941; Chiropterotriton arborea (Taylor, 1941)

Species of amphibian

The arboreal splayfoot salamander (Chiropterotriton arboreus), or arboreal flat-footed salamander, is a species of bromeliad-dwelling salamander in the family Plethodontidae. It is endemic to Mexico where it is only found near its type locality near Tianguistengo in Hidalgo state.

== Morphology ==
The arboreal splayfoot salamander is morphologically specialized to life in a bromeliad microhabitat. Like most bromeliad-dwelling salamanders it has relatively long legs with widely-spread digits. C. arboreus is a member of the multidentatus group, whose members are distinguished by webbed digits, and large terminal phylangeal pads.

The arboreal splayfoot salamander has a prehensile tail which can be regenerated if lost.The tail is longer than the rest of the body. The snout-to-vent length of known specimens ranges between 27–38 mm while the tail length of intact tails ranges from 32–50mm.

Like other bromelid-dwelling salamenders, the arboreal splayfoot salamander has forward-facing eyes. Like other member of the multidentatus group it has teeth which are both larger and fewer in number than those of most arboreal salamanders. Collected specimens whose teeth could be counted had 9–17 vomerine teeth, 25–62 maxillary teeth, and 35–49 mandibular teeth. The teeth of males tend to be larger than those of females.

== Habitat and ecology ==
The arboreal splayfoot salamander inhabits humid pine-oak and cloud forests at elevations of 1,900–2,100 m (6,200–6,900 ft) above sea level. It lives in arboreal bromeliad microhabitats where it feeds on small insects.

The arboreal splayfoot salamander is considered critically endangered as its known habitat consists of only 14km^{2}, leaving it extremely vulnerable to habitat loss by deforestation and habitat fragmentation.
