= ATOH8 =

Protein-coding gene in humans

Identifiers
- Aliases: ATOH8, HATH6, bHLHa21, atonal bHLH transcription factor 8
- External IDs: MGI: 1918343; GeneCards: ATOH8

Gene location (Human)
Chr.	Chromosome 2 (human)
Band	2p11.2	Start	85,751,344 bp
Band	2p11.2	End	85,791,383 bp

Gene location (Mouse)
Chr.	Chromosome 6 (mouse)
Band	6|6 C1	Start	72,183,161 bp
Band	6|6 C1	End	72,212,561 bp
RNA expression pattern
Bgee	Human / Mouse (ortholog); Top expressed in: right lobe of thyroid gland; left lobe of thyroid gland; right lung; tibial nerve; popliteal artery; tibial arteries; thoracic aorta; right auricle of heart; ascending aorta; apex of heart / Top expressed in: spermatid; gastrula; seminiferous tubule; spermatocyte; tail of embryo; genital tubercle; endothelial cell of lymphatic vessel; aortic valve; muscle of thigh; ascending aorta; More reference expression data
BioGPS	n/a
Gene ontology
Molecular function	DNA binding; protein dimerization activity; DNA-binding transcription factor activity; transcription factor binding; E-box binding; DNA-binding transcription factor activity, RNA polymerase II-specific
Cellular component	cytoplasm; nuclear speck; nucleus; nucleoplasm
Biological process	cell differentiation; positive regulation of endothelial cell differentiation; regulation of transcription, DNA-templated; SMAD protein signal transduction; transcription, DNA-templated; nervous system development; negative regulation of endothelial cell proliferation; positive regulation of endothelial cell migration; positive regulation of transcription, DNA-templated; multicellular organism development; tube formation; myoblast proliferation; formation of primary germ layer; negative regulation of transcription, DNA-templated; regulation of transcription by RNA polymerase II; positive regulation of gene expression; negative regulation of gene expression; positive regulation of pri-miRNA transcription by RNA polymerase II
Sources:Amigo / QuickGO
Orthologs
Databases	NCBI: entry; OMA: entry
Species	Human	Mouse
Entrez	84913	71093
Ensembl	ENSG00000168874	ENSMUSG00000037621
UniProt	Q96SQ7	Q99NA2
RefSeq (mRNA)	NM_032827	NM_153778
RefSeq (protein)	NP_116216	NP_722473
Location (UCSC)	Chr 2: 85.75 – 85.79 Mb	Chr 6: 72.18 – 72.21 Mb
PubMed search
- Wikidata
View/Edit Human	View/Edit Mouse

Atonal bHLH transcription factor 8 is a protein that in humans is encoded by the ATOH8 gene. It is hypothesized to play a role endochondral ossification as a regulator of chondrocyte proliferation and differentiation. In addition, it also participates in the chondrogenesis of limb bud mesenchymal progenitor cells.
