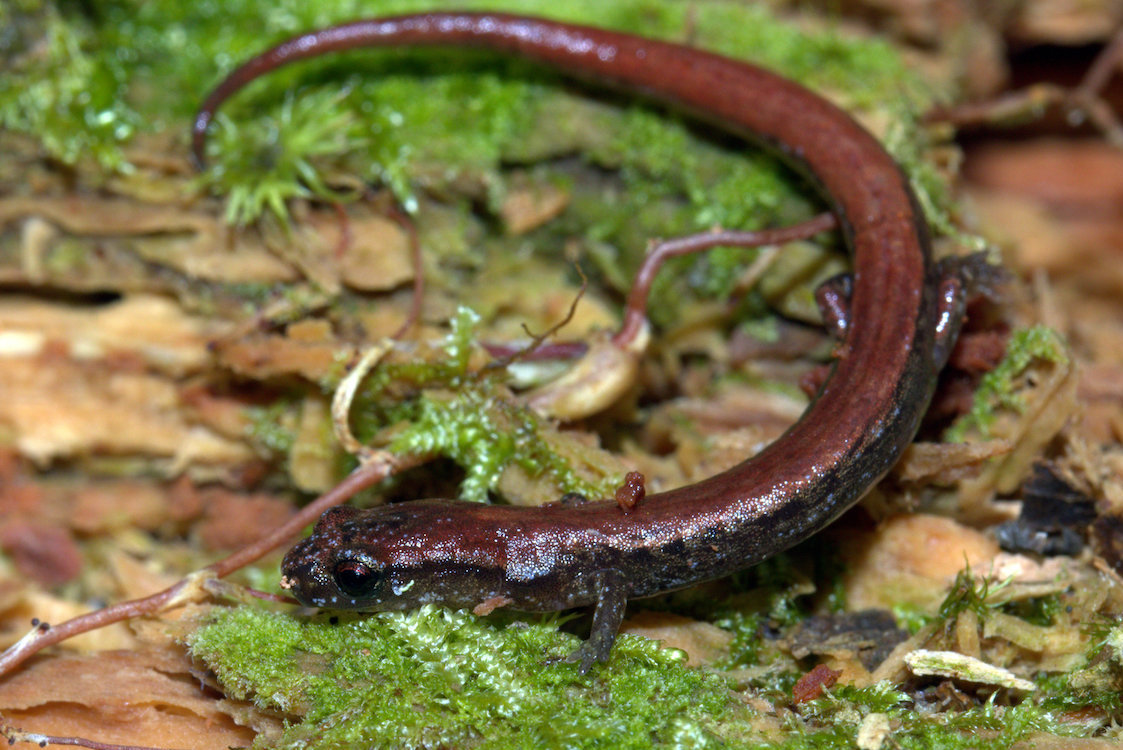

Conservation status
- Critically Endangered (IUCN 3.1)

Scientific classification
- Kingdom: Animalia
- Phylum: Chordata
- Class: Amphibia
- Order: Urodela
- Family: Plethodontidae
- Genus: Chiropterotriton
- Species: C. terrestris

Binomial name
- Chiropterotriton terrestris (Taylor, 1941)

Synonyms
- Bolitoglossa terrestris Taylor, 1941

= Terrestrial splayfoot salamander =

Species of amphibian

The terrestrial splayfoot salamander (Chiropterotriton terrestris), also known as the terrestrial flat-footed salamander, is a species of salamander in the family Plethodontidae. It is endemic to the Sierra Madre Oriental of eastern Hidalgo state, Mexico. Its natural habitats are humid pine–oak and cloud forests. It is threatened by habitat loss due to deforestation and the potential spread of amphibian pathogens due to the illegal pet trade.
