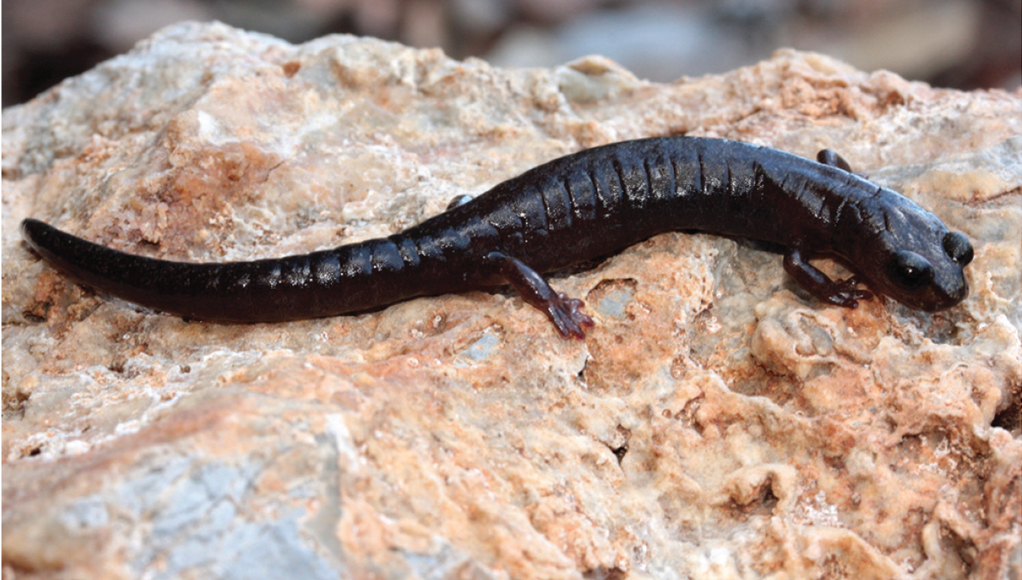

Conservation status
- Near Threatened (IUCN 3.1)

Scientific classification
- Kingdom: Animalia
- Phylum: Chordata
- Class: Amphibia
- Order: Urodela
- Family: Plethodontidae
- Genus: Chiropterotriton
- Species: C. priscus

Binomial name
- Chiropterotriton priscus Rabb, 1956

Synonyms
- Chiropterotriton prisca Rabb, 1956

= Primeval splayfoot salamander =

Species of amphibian

The primeval splayfoot salamander (Chiropterotriton priscus), also known as the primeval flat-footed salamander, is a species of salamander in the family Plethodontidae. It is endemic to Mexico and known from near its type locality on Cerro Potosí in Nuevo León as well as from adjacent Coahuila, at elevations above 3,000 m (9,800 ft) asl. Its natural habitats are pine and pine-fir forests. It is a terrestrial species found under fallen logs and under bark.

The species is still abundant, but its range is small and there is a risk of habitat loss through logging.
