= EBF1 =

Protein-coding gene in the species Homo sapiens

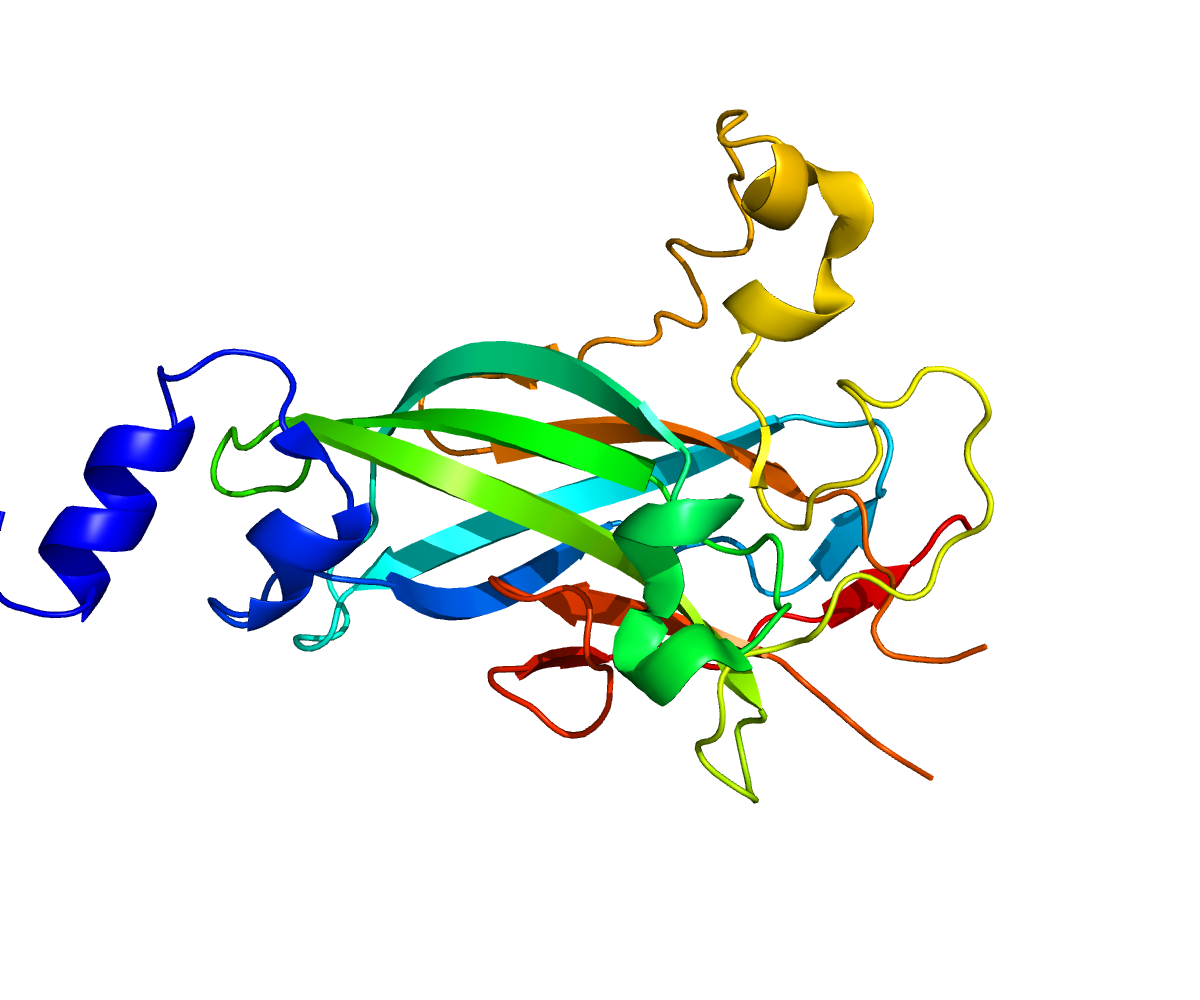

Identifiers
- Aliases: EBF1, COE1, EBF, O/E-1, OLF1, early B-cell factor 1, early B cell factor 1, EBF transcription factor 1
- External IDs: OMIM: 164343; MGI: 95275; GeneCards: EBF1
Available structures
PDB	Ortholog search: PDBe RCSB
PDB	List of PDB id codes 3LYR, 3MQI

Gene location (Human)
Chr.	Chromosome 5 (human)
Band	5q33.3	Start	158,695,916 bp
Band	5q33.3	End	159,099,916 bp

Gene location (Mouse)
Chr.	Chromosome 11 (mouse)
Band	11 B1.1|11 26.45 cM	Start	44,617,317 bp
Band	11 B1.1|11 26.45 cM	End	45,008,091 bp
RNA expression pattern
Bgee	Human / Mouse (ortholog); Top expressed in: synovial joint; synovial membrane; Achilles tendon; oocyte; buccal mucosa cell; skin of hip; cardiac muscle tissue of right atrium; parietal pleura; vena cava; spinal ganglia / Top expressed in: external carotid artery; internal carotid artery; trigeminal ganglion; superior cervical ganglion; spinal ganglia; neural tube; ankle; lumbar spinal ganglion; subcutaneous adipose tissue; brown adipose tissue; More reference expression data
BioGPS	n/a
Gene ontology
Molecular function	DNA binding; protein binding; metal ion binding; DNA-binding transcription factor activity; protein dimerization activity; DNA-binding transcription factor activity, RNA polymerase II-specific; C2H2 zinc finger domain binding; DNA-binding transcription activator activity, RNA polymerase II-specific
Cellular component	nucleus
Biological process	multicellular organism development; regulation of transcription, DNA-templated; transcription, DNA-templated; regulation of transcription by RNA polymerase II; positive regulation of transcription by RNA polymerase II
Sources:Amigo / QuickGO
Orthologs
Databases	NCBI: entry; OMA: entry
Species	Human	Mouse
Entrez	1879	13591
Ensembl	ENSG00000164330	ENSMUSG00000057098
UniProt	Q9UH73	Q07802
RefSeq (mRNA)	NM_001290360; NM_024007; NM_182708; NM_001324101; NM_001324103 NM_001324106; NM_001324107; NM_001324108; NM_001324109; NM_001324111; NM_001364155; NM_001364156; NM_001364157; NM_001364158; NM_001364159	NM_001290709; NM_001290710; NM_001290711; NM_007897
RefSeq (protein)	NP_001277289; NP_001311030; NP_001311032; NP_001311035; NP_001311036 NP_001311037; NP_001311038; NP_001311040; NP_076870; NP_874367; NP_001351084; NP_001351085; NP_001351086; NP_001351087; NP_001351088	NP_001277638; NP_001277639; NP_001277640; NP_031923; NP_001349498 NP_001349500; NP_001349503; NP_001349504; NP_001349505; NP_001349506; NP_001349507; NP_001349508
Location (UCSC)	Chr 5: 158.7 – 159.1 Mb	Chr 11: 44.62 – 45.01 Mb
PubMed search
- Wikidata
View/Edit Human	View/Edit Mouse

Transcription factor COE1 is a protein that in humans is encoded by the EBF1 gene. EBF1 stands for Early B-Cell Factor 1.

EBF1 controls the expression of key proteins required for B cell differentiation, signal transduction and function. The crucial role of this factor is shown in the regulation of expression of SLAM family co-receptors in B-cells. In addition, EBF1 is also noted for its role in chondrogenic differentiation in limb bud mesenchymal progenitor cells.

== Interactions ==
EBF1 has been shown to interact with ZNF423 and CREB binding protein.
