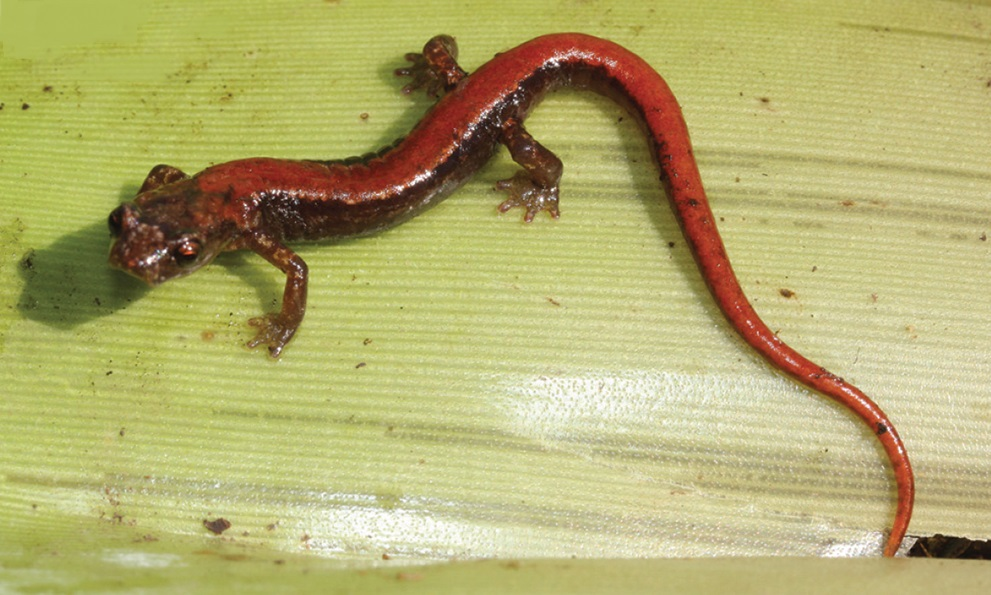

Conservation status
- Critically Endangered (IUCN 3.1)

Scientific classification
- Kingdom: Animalia
- Phylum: Chordata
- Class: Amphibia
- Order: Urodela
- Family: Plethodontidae
- Genus: Chiropterotriton
- Species: C. lavae

Binomial name
- Chiropterotriton lavae (Taylor, 1942)

Synonyms
- Bolitoglossa lavae Taylor, 1942

= Pygmy splayfoot salamander =

Species of amphibian

The pygmy splayfoot salamander (Chiropterotriton lavae), also known as the pygmy flat-footed salamander, is a species of salamander in the family Plethodontidae. It is endemic to the central-western Veracruz state, Mexico. Its natural habitats are pine-oak and cloud forests at about 1,200 m (3,900 ft) altitude. It lives in bromeliads. It is threatened by severe habitat loss caused by logging and mining.
