= ZNF423 =

Protein-coding gene in the species Homo sapiens

Identifiers
- Aliases: ZNF423, Ebfaz, JBTS19, NPHP14, OAZ, Roaz, ZFP423, Zfp104, hOAZ, zinc finger protein 423
- External IDs: OMIM: 604557; MGI: 1891217; GeneCards: ZNF423
Available structures
PDB	Ortholog search: PDBe RCSB
PDB	List of PDB id codes 2MDG

Gene location (Human)
Chr.	Chromosome 16 (human)
Band	16q12.1	Start	49,487,524 bp
Band	16q12.1	End	49,857,919 bp

Gene location (Mouse)
Chr.	Chromosome 8 (mouse)
Band	8|8 C3	Start	88,388,438 bp
Band	8|8 C3	End	88,686,223 bp
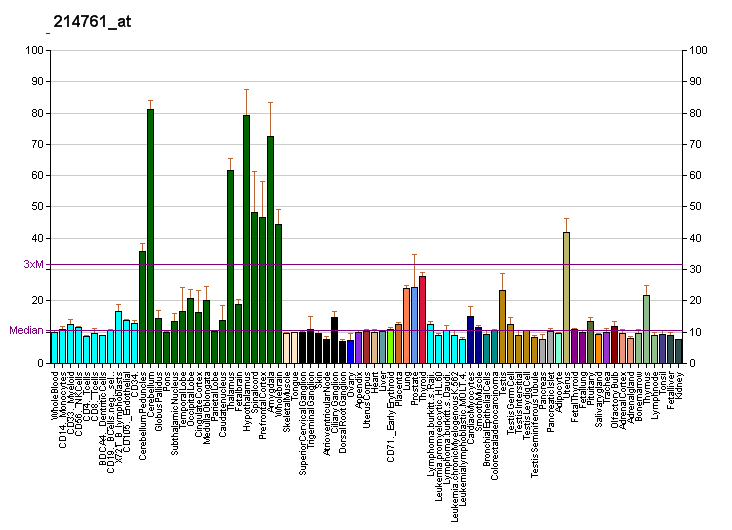
RNA expression pattern
Bgee	Human / Mouse (ortholog); Top expressed in: Skeletal muscle tissue of biceps brachii; cartilage tissue; tail of epididymis; ganglionic eminence; skin of hip; Skeletal muscle tissue of rectus abdominis; optic nerve; vastus lateralis muscle; buccal mucosa cell; caput epididymis / Top expressed in: tail of embryo; genital tubercle; medial dorsal nucleus; dorsomedial hypothalamic nucleus; zygote; lateral septal nucleus; lateral geniculate nucleus; vestibular sensory epithelium; secondary oocyte; ventricular zone; More reference expression data
BioGPS	More reference expression data
Gene ontology
Molecular function	DNA binding; protein binding; metal ion binding; nucleic acid binding; DNA-binding transcription factor activity, RNA polymerase II-specific; DNA-binding transcription factor activity
Cellular component	nucleus; nucleoplasm
Biological process	Notch signaling pathway; positive regulation of transcription, DNA-templated; multicellular organism development; cell differentiation; negative regulation of transcription, DNA-templated; regulation of transcription, DNA-templated; transcription, DNA-templated; nervous system development; positive regulation of BMP signaling pathway; negative regulation of cold-induced thermogenesis
Sources:Amigo / QuickGO
Orthologs
Databases	NCBI: entry; OMA: entry
Species	Human	Mouse
Entrez	23090	94187
Ensembl	ENSG00000102935	ENSMUSG00000045333
UniProt	Q2M1K9	Q80TS5
RefSeq (mRNA)	NM_001271620; NM_015069; NM_001330533; NM_001379286	NM_033327; NM_001310520
RefSeq (protein)	NP_001258549; NP_001317462; NP_055884; NP_001366215	NP_001297449; NP_201584
Location (UCSC)	Chr 16: 49.49 – 49.86 Mb	Chr 8: 88.39 – 88.69 Mb
PubMed search
- Wikidata
View/Edit Human	View/Edit Mouse

Zinc finger protein 423 is a protein that in humans is encoded by the ZNF423 gene.

The protein encoded by this gene is a nuclear protein that belongs to the family of Kruppel-like C2H2 zinc finger proteins. It functions as a DNA-binding transcription factor by using distinct zinc fingers in different signaling pathways. Thus, it is thought that this gene may have multiple roles in signal transduction during development. Mice lacking the homologous gene Zfp423 have defects in midline brain development, especially in the cerebellum, as well as defects in olfactory development, and adipogenesis. Patients with mutations in ZNF423 have been reported in Joubert Syndrome and nephronophthisis.

== Interactions ==
ZNF423 has been shown to interact with EBF1, PARP1, Notch intracellular domain, retinoic acid receptor, and CEP290.
