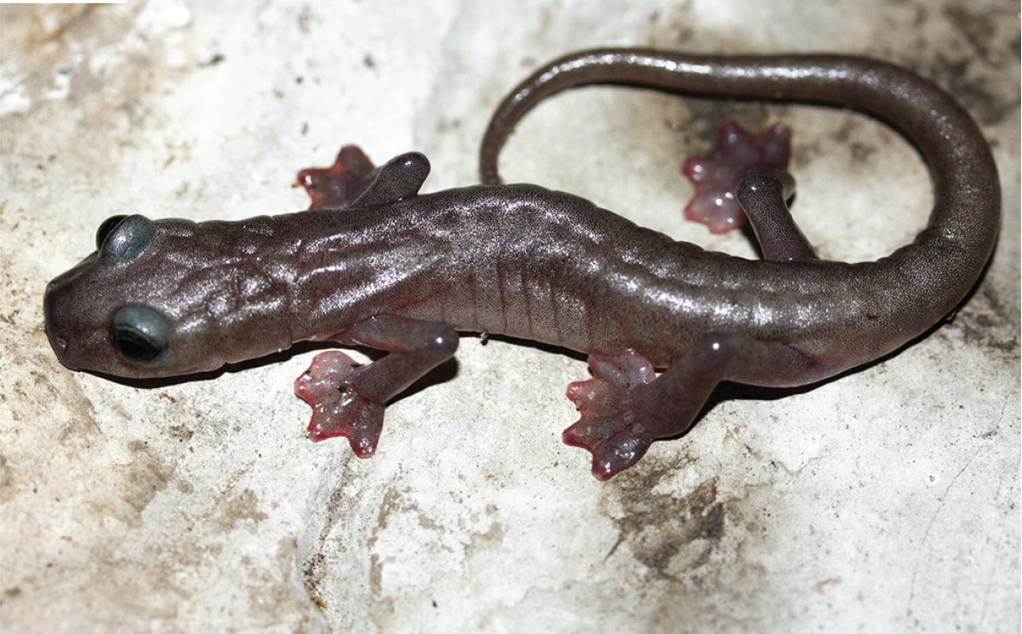
- Chiropterotriton magnipes

Scientific classification
- Kingdom: Animalia
- Phylum: Chordata
- Class: Amphibia
- Order: Urodela
- Family: Plethodontidae
- Subfamily: Hemidactyliinae
- Genus: Chiropterotriton; Taylor, 1944

Diversity
- 15 species (see text)

= Chiropterotriton =

Genus of salamanders

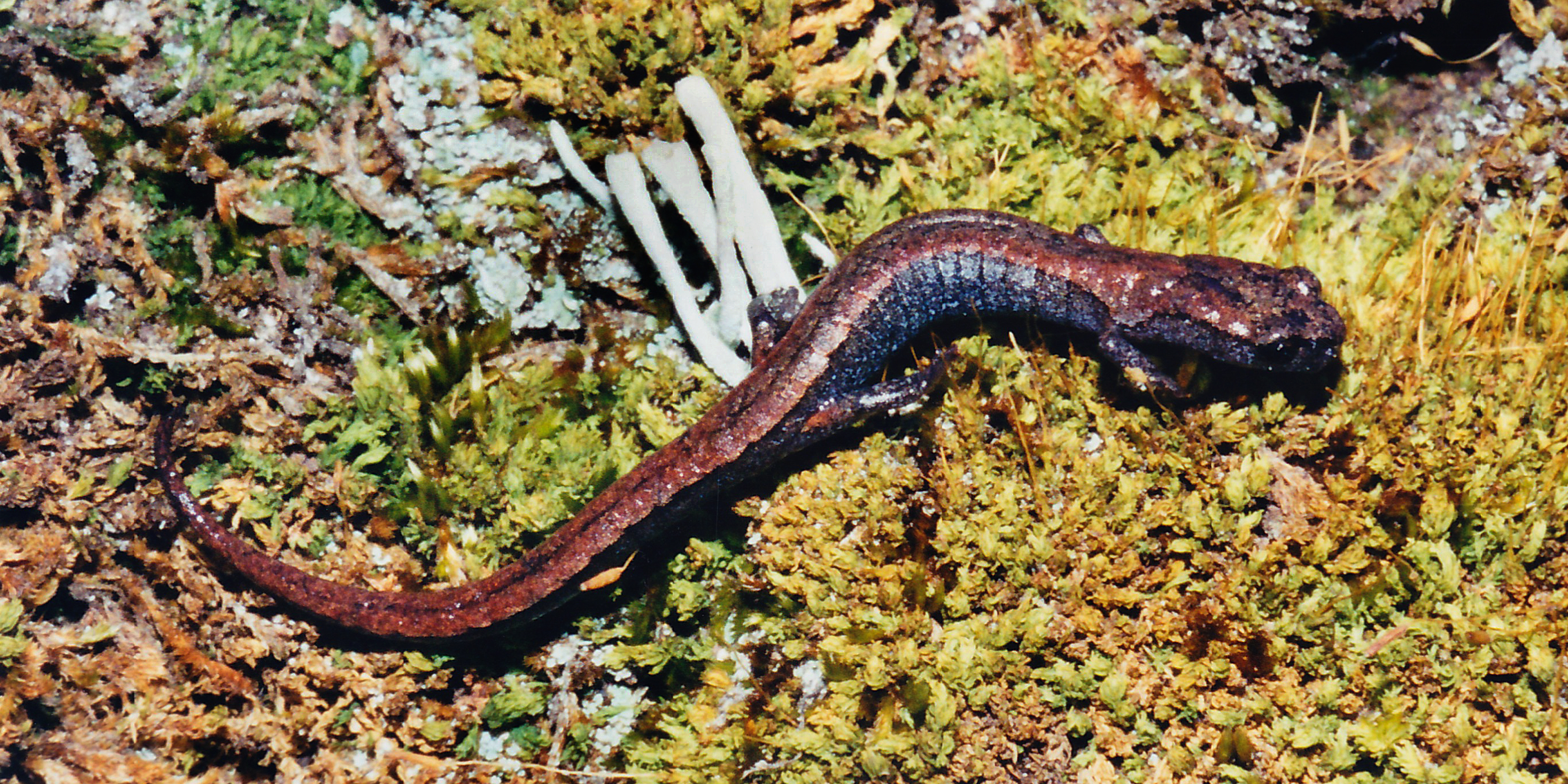
Miquihuana splayfoot salamander (Chiropterotriton miquihuanus) Municipality of Miquihuana, Tamaulipas, Mexico (5 July 2004).

Chiropterotriton, also known as splayfoot salamanders or flat-footed salamanders, is a genus of salamanders in the family Plethodontidae. The genus is endemic to Mexico.

Chiropterotriton are widely distributed in northern and eastern Mexico. They are an ecologically diverse group, occupying a range of habitats, including cloud forests, pine-oak forests, oak forests, and caves. They may be found in various microhabitats, such as arboreal bromeliads, rock crevices, caves, and terrestrial cover objects. Most species are superficially similar in their appearance, making species delimitation by purely morphological means difficult. However, molecular methods have aided description of new species.

== Species ==
As of 2020, this genus includes 23 species:

Binomial Name and Author	Common name
Chiropterotriton arboreus (Taylor, 1941)	Arboreal splayfoot salamander
Chiropterotriton aureus García-Castillo et al., 2018	Atzalan golden salamander
Chiropterotriton casasi Parra-Olea et al., 2020	Tlapacoyan salamander
Chiropterotriton ceronorum Parra-Olea et al., 2020	Ceron family salamander
Chiropterotriton chico García-Castillo, Rovito, Wake, and Parra-Olea, 2017	El Chico salamander
Chiropterotriton chiropterus Cope, 1863	Common splayfoot salamander
Chiropterotriton chondrostega Taylor, 1941	Gristle-headed splayfoot salamander
Chiropterotriton cieloensis Rovito and Parra-Olea, 2015	El Cielo salamander
Chiropterotriton cracens Rabb, 1958	Graceful splayfoot salamander
Chiropterotriton dimidiatus Taylor, 1939	Dwarf splayfoot salamander
Chiropterotriton infernalis Rovito and Parra-Olea, 2015	Sistema Purificación salamander
Chiropterotriton lavae Taylor, 1942	Pygmy splayfoot salamander
Chiropterotriton magnipes Rabb, 1965	Bigfoot splayfoot salamander
Chiropterotriton melipona Parra-Olea et al., 2020
Chiropterotriton miquihuanus Campbell, Streicher, Cox, and Brodie, 2014	Miquihuana splayfoot salamander
Chiropterotriton mosaueri Woodall, 1941	Cave splayfoot salamander
Chiropterotriton multidentatus Taylor, 1938	Toothy splayfoot salamander
Chiropterotriton nubilus García-Castillo et al., 2018	Cloud forest salamander from Cofre de Perote
Chiropterotriton orculus Cope, 1865	Chignahuapan splayfoot salamander
Chiropterotriton perotensis Parra-Olea et al., 2020
Chiropterotriton priscus Rabb, 1956	Primeval splayfoot salamander
Chiropterotriton terrestris Taylor, 1941	Terrestrial splayfoot salamander
Chiropterotriton totonacus Parra-Olea et al., 2020
