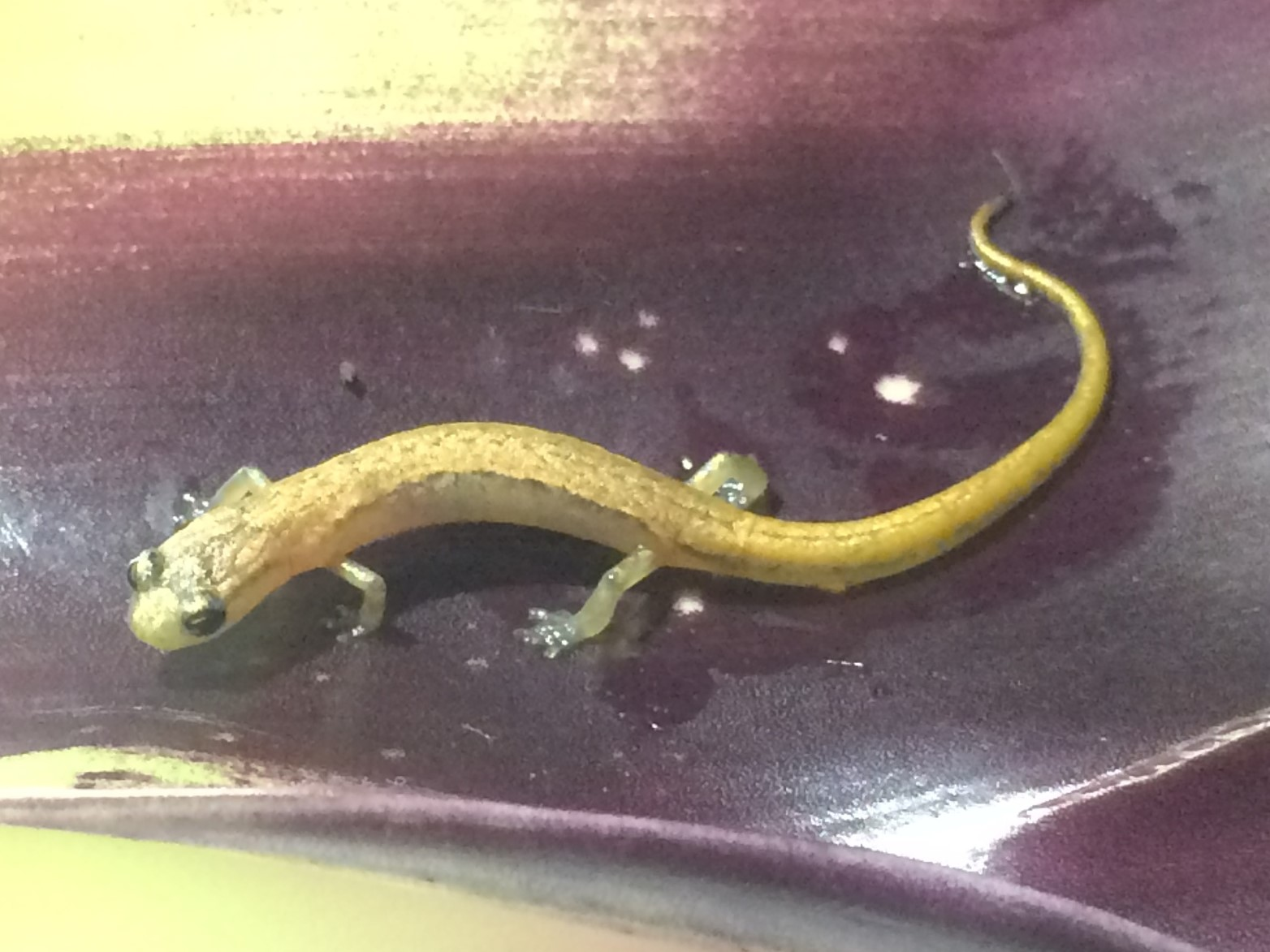

Conservation status
- Critically Endangered (IUCN 3.1)

Scientific classification
- Kingdom: Animalia
- Phylum: Chordata
- Class: Amphibia
- Order: Urodela
- Family: Plethodontidae
- Genus: Chiropterotriton
- Species: C. aureus

Binomial name
- Chiropterotriton aureus García-Castillo et al., 2018

= Atzalan golden salamander =

Species of salamander

Chiropterotriton aureus, the Atzalan golden salamander, is a species of salamander in the family Plethodontidae. It is endemic to the Chiconquiaco region of the Sierra Madre Oriental of Veracruz, Mexico. It has been found in a heavily degraded cloud forest habitat with large numbers of arboreal bromeliads over oak trees.
