= Chiropterotriton ceronorum =

Conservation status
- Critically Endangered (IUCN 3.1)

Scientific classification
- Kingdom: Animalia
- Phylum: Chordata
- Class: Amphibia
- Order: Urodela
- Family: Plethodontidae
- Genus: Chiropterotriton
- Species: C. ceronorum

Binomial name
- Chiropterotriton ceronorum Parra-Olea, Garcia-Castillo, Rovito, Maisano, Hanken, Wake, 2020

Species of amphibian

Chiropterotriton ceronorum, the Ceron family salamander, is a species of salamander in the family Plethodontidae. It is endemic to the forests of Pico de Orizaba in Mexico.

== Habitat ==
Chiropterotriton ceronorum is found exclusively in a narrow region of the Mexican states Puebla and Veracruz, along the forested slopes of Pico de Orizaba, at an elevation between 2600 and 3100 meters.

== Conservation status ==
Chiropterotriton ceronorum was assessed as critically endangered by the IUCN in 2020, threatened primarily by habitat loss. The forests in which the salamander lives are severely fragmented and of decreasing size and quality.
