= Cloud forest salamander from Cofre de Perote =

Conservation status
- Critically Endangered (IUCN 3.1)

Scientific classification
- Kingdom: Animalia
- Phylum: Chordata
- Class: Amphibia
- Order: Urodela
- Family: Plethodontidae
- Genus: Chiropterotriton
- Species: C. nubilus

Binomial name
- Chiropterotriton nubilus García-Castillo et al., 2018

Species of amphibian

The cloud forest salamander from Cofre de Perote (Chiropterotriton nubilus) is a species of salamander in the family Plethodontidae. It is endemic to Cofre de Perote in central Veracruz, Mexico, where it is known from arboreal bromeliads in cloud forests with low to moderate disturbance.
