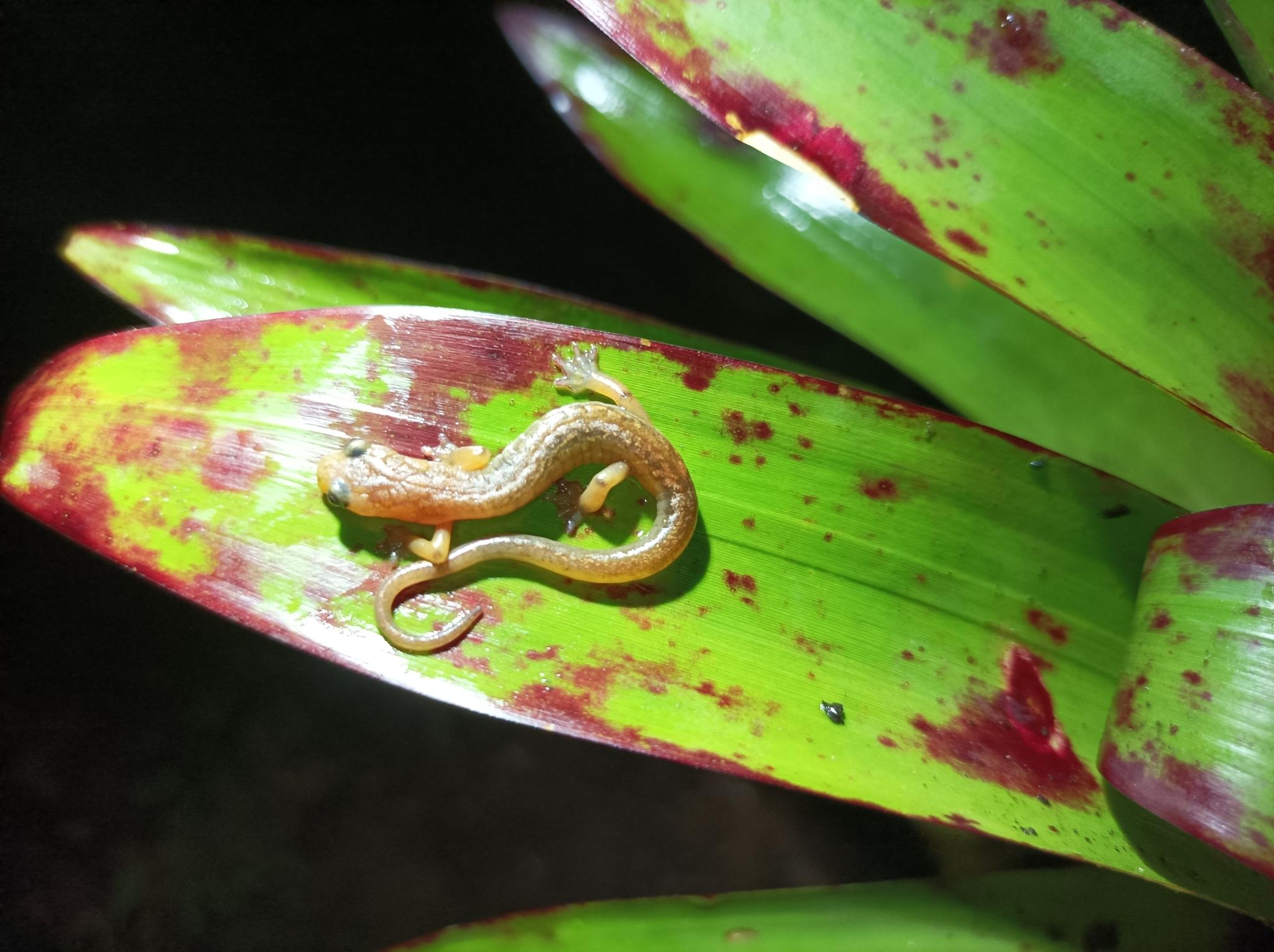

Conservation status
- Critically Endangered (IUCN 3.1)

Scientific classification
- Kingdom: Animalia
- Phylum: Chordata
- Class: Amphibia
- Order: Urodela
- Family: Plethodontidae
- Genus: Chiropterotriton
- Species: C. chiropterus

Binomial name
- Chiropterotriton chiropterus (Cope, 1863)

Synonyms
- Spelerpes chiropterus Cope, 1863; Spelerpes laticeps Brocchi, 1883

= Common splayfoot salamander =

Species of amphibian

The common splayfoot salamander or common flat-footed salamander (Chiropterotriton chiropterus) is a species of salamander in the family Plethodontidae. It is endemic to the Huatusco–Xalapa region of Veracruz, Mexico. Several unnamed species might exist under this name.

Its natural habitat is cloud forest where it occurs in bromeliads and moss. It is threatened by habitat loss caused by deforestation.
