= NKX3-2 =

Protein-coding gene in the species Homo sapiens

Identifiers
- Aliases: NKX3-2, NK3 homeobox 2, BAPX1, NKX3.2, NKX3B, SMMD
- External IDs: OMIM: 602183; MGI: 108015; GeneCards: NKX3-2

Gene location (Human)
| Chr. | Chromosome 4 (human) |
| Band | 4p15.33 | Start | 13,540,830 bp |
| Band | 4p15.33 | End | 13,544,508 bp |

Gene location (Mouse)
| Chr. | Chromosome 5 (mouse) |
| Band | 5 B3|5 22.58 cM | Start | 41,918,826 bp |
| Band | 5 B3|5 22.58 cM | End | 41,921,844 bp |
RNA expression pattern
| Bgee | Human / Mouse (ortholog); Top expressed in: tibia; muscle layer of sigmoid colon; cartilage tissue; tendon of biceps brachii; transverse colon; gonad; spleen; smooth muscle tissue; embryo; rectum / Top expressed in: sclerotome; female urethra; male urethra; embryo; somite; lateral plate mesoderm; embryo; primordial pancreas; Meckel's cartilage; vertebra; More reference expression data |
| BioGPS | n/a |
Gene ontology
| Molecular function | DNA binding; sequence-specific DNA binding; RNA polymerase II cis-regulatory region sequence-specific DNA binding; DNA-binding transcription repressor activity, RNA polymerase II-specific; DNA-binding transcription factor activity, RNA polymerase II-specific; DNA-binding transcription factor activity |
| Cellular component | nucleus |
| Biological process | animal organ development; skeletal system development; regulation of transcription, DNA-templated; digestive system development; intestinal epithelial cell development; skeletal system morphogenesis; negative regulation of apoptotic process; negative regulation of transcription by RNA polymerase II; spleen development; transcription by RNA polymerase II; transcription, DNA-templated; embryonic skeletal system development; animal organ formation; determination of left/right symmetry; negative regulation of chondrocyte differentiation; middle ear morphogenesis; pancreas development; cell differentiation; positive regulation of transcription by RNA polymerase II |
Sources:Amigo / QuickGO
Orthologs
| Databases | NCBI: entry; OMA: entry |
| Species | Human | Mouse |
| Entrez | 579 | 12020 |
| Ensembl | ENSG00000109705 | ENSMUSG00000049691 |
| UniProt | P78367 | P97503 |
| RefSeq (mRNA) | NM_001189 | NM_007524 |
| RefSeq (protein) | NP_001180 | NP_031550 |
| Location (UCSC) | Chr 4: 13.54 – 13.54 Mb | Chr 5: 41.92 – 41.92 Mb |
| PubMed search |
- Wikidata
| View/Edit Human | View/Edit Mouse |

NK3 homeobox 2 also known as NKX3-2 is a human gene. It is a homolog of bagpipe (bap) in Drosophila and therefore also known as Bapx1 (bagpipe homeobox homolog 1). The protein encoded by this gene is a homeodomain containing transcription factor.

== Function ==
NKX3-2 plays a role in the development of the axial and limb skeleton. Mutations disrupting the function of this gene are associated with spondylo-megaepiphyseal-metaphyseal dysplasia (SMMD). Nkx3-2 in mice also regulates patterning in the middle ear. Two small bones in the middle ear, the malleus and incus, are homologous to the articular and quadrate, the bones of the proximal jaw joint in fish and other non-mammalian jawed vertebrates. NKX3-2 expression is required to pattern the articulated joint between these jaw bones, as knockdowns or knockouts of this gene result in the loss of the jaw joint in zebrafish, chicken, and amphibians. Overexpression of this gene results in the development of ectopic mandibular cartilages in zebrafish and amphibians.
