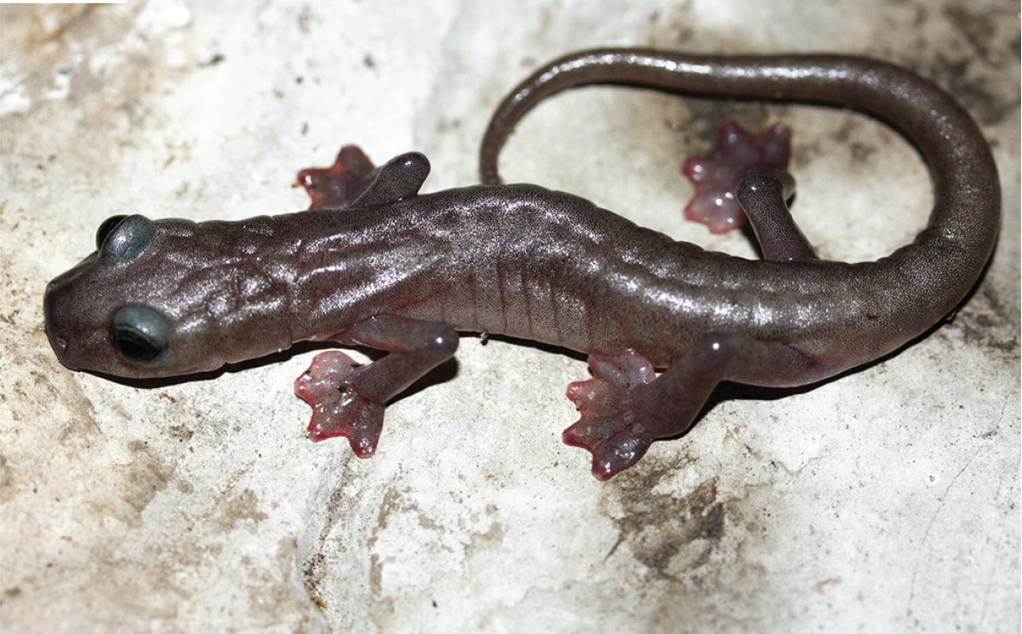

Conservation status
- Endangered (IUCN 3.1)

Scientific classification
- Kingdom: Animalia
- Phylum: Chordata
- Class: Amphibia
- Order: Urodela
- Family: Plethodontidae
- Genus: Chiropterotriton
- Species: C. magnipes

Binomial name
- Chiropterotriton magnipes Rabb, 1965

= Bigfoot splayfoot salamander =

Species of amphibian

The bigfoot splayfoot salamander (Chiropterotriton magnipes), also known as the big-footed salamander, is a species of salamander in the family Plethodontidae. It is endemic to Mexico and only known from north-eastern Queretaro, at elevations of 1,300–1,810 m (4,270–5,940 ft) asl.

Its natural habitats are caves and crevices in pine–oak forest. It has also been spotted in a tunnel under a church. It is threatened by habitat loss: removing the forest causes caves to dry up. The species has never been common.
