= IUCN Red List endangered species (Animalia) =

Animals classified as endangered by the IUCN

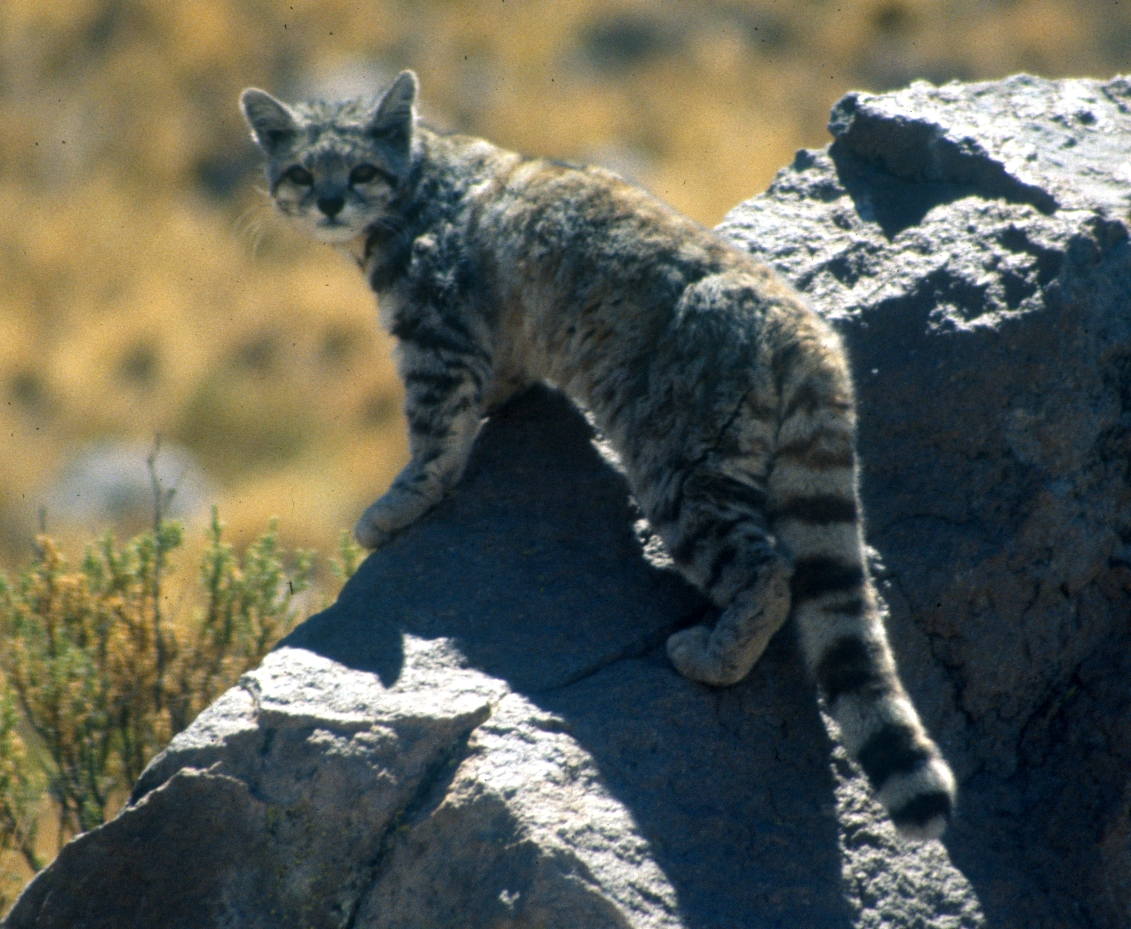
The Andean mountain cat is an endangered species.

On 19 August 2018, the IUCN Red List of Threatened Species identified 4584 endangered species, subspecies, stocks and subpopulations.

== Annelida ==
=== Clitellata ===
==== Megadrilaceae ====
===== Megascolecidae =====
- Diporochaeta pounamu
- Diporochaeta radula
- Driloleirus macelfreshi
- Megascolides australis
- Tokea huttoni
- Tokea kirki
- Tokea unipapillata
- Zacharius obo

===== Moniligastridae =====
- Drawida moriokaensis

==== Opisthopora ====
===== Octochaetidae =====
- Deinodrilus gorgon
- Deinodrilus medusa
- Octochaetus diememoratio
- Octochaetus kenleei

== Arthropoda ==
=== Arachnida ===
==== Araneae ====
===== Araneidae =====
- Larinia dasia
- Prasonica anarillea
- Prasonicella marsa

===== Barychelidae =====
- Sason sechellanum

===== Clubionidae =====
- Clubiona mahensis
- Clubiona nigrimaculosa

===== Lycosidae =====
- Adelocosa anops
- Vesubia jugorum

===== Nephilidae =====
- Nephilingis borbonica
- Nephilingis dodo

===== Oonopidae =====
- Gamasomorpha mornensis
- Ischnothyreus serpentinum
- Lionneta mahensis
- Lionneta orophila
- Lionneta praslinensis
- Lionneta savyi
- Lionneta sechellensis
- Lionneta silhouettei
- Lionneta veli
- Orchestina justini
- Orchestina sechellorum
- Patri david
- Prida sechellensis
- Stenoonops opisthornatus

===== Pholcidae =====
- Cenemus mikehilli
- Cenemus silhouette

===== Salticidae =====
- Baviola luteosignata
- Cynapes wrighti
- Hispo alboclypea
- Hispo striolata
- Microbianor golovatchi
- Pseudicius seychellensis
- Sadies gibbosa
- Sadies trifasciata
- Salpesia soricina

===== Scytodidae =====
- Scytodes pholcoides

===== Symphytognathidae =====
- Anapistula seychellensis

===== Telemidae =====
- Seychellia wiljoi

===== Tetrablemmidae =====
- Mariblemma pandani
- Tetrablemma benoiti

===== Tetragnathidae =====
- Tylorida mornensis

===== Theraphosidae =====
- Haploclastus kayi
- Poecilotheria formosa
- Poecilotheria miranda
- Poecilotheria rufilata

===== Theridiidae =====
- Argyrodes chionus
- Bardala labarda
- Dipoena hasra
- Dipoena pristea
- Euryopis helcra
- Nanume naneum
- Phycosoma menustya
- Rhomphaea recurvata
- Robertia braueri
- Theridion cloxum
- Theridion mehlum
- Theridion nagorum
- Theridion palanum

===== Thomisidae =====
- Firmicus insularis

==== Holothyrida ====
===== Holothyridae =====
- Sternothyrus braueri

==== Opiliones ====
===== Biantidae =====
- Biantes albimanus
- Biantes minimus

===== Oncopodidae =====
- Gnomulus bedoharvengorum

===== Podoctidae =====
- Ibalonius bimaculatus
- Ibalonius inscriptus
- Ibalonius karschii

===== Samoidae =====
- Mitraceras pulchra
- Samoa sechellana

==== Oribatida ====
===== Scheloribatidae =====
- Scheloribates evanescens

==== Pseudoscorpiones ====
===== Atemnidae =====
- Anatemnus seychellesensis

===== Syarinidae =====
- Ideoblothrus seychellesensis

===== Tridenchthoniidae =====
- Compsaditha seychellensis

==== Schizomida ====
===== Hubbardiidae =====
- Anepsiozomus sobrinus
- Apozomus gerlachi

==== Scorpiones ====
===== Buthidae =====
- Isometrus deharvengi

=== Branchiopoda ===
==== Anostraca ====
===== Branchinectidae =====
- Branchinecta conservatio
- Branchinecta longiantenna
- Branchinecta sandiegonensis

===== Streptocephalidae =====
- Streptocephalus dendrophorus
- Streptocephalus dendyi
- Streptocephalus guzmani
- Streptocephalus woottoni
- Streptocephalus zuluensis

===== Thamnocephalidae =====
- Branchinella alachua

==== Notostraca ====
===== Triopsidae =====
- Lepidurus packardi

=== Chilopoda ===
==== Geophilomorpha ====
===== Mecistocephalidae =====
- Mecistocephalus megalodon

==== Lithobiomorpha ====
===== Lithobiidae =====
- Australobius abbreviatus
- Australobius inflatitarsis
- Australobius sechellarum

==== Scutigeromorpha ====
===== Scutigeridae =====
- Seychellonema gerlachi

=== Diplopoda ===
==== Polyzoniida ====
===== Siphonotidae =====
- Rhinotus densepilosus
- Rhinotus vanmoli

==== Siphonophorida ====
===== Siphonophoridae =====
- Gonatotrichus silhouettensis
- Pterozonium tropiphorum

==== Sphaerotheriida ====
===== Arthrosphaeridae =====
- Sphaeromimus inexpectatus
- Zoosphaerium arborealis
- Zoosphaerium solitarium
- Zoosphaerium tainkintana

===== Zephroniidae =====
- Sechelliosoma forcipatum

==== Spirobolida ====
===== Pachybolidae =====
- Alluviobolus antanosy
- Alluviobolus tsimelahy
- Aphistogoniulus aridus
- Aphistogoniulus hova
- Aphistogoniulus infernalis
- Aphistogoniulus jeekeli
- Aphistogoniulus sanguineus
- Colossobolus aculeatus
- Colossobolus semicyclus
- Eucarlia hoffmani
- Eucarlia urophora
- Flagellobolus pauliani
- Riotintobolus aridus
- Spiromanes braueri
- Spiromanes sechellarum

===== Spirobolellidae =====
- Hylekobolus griseus

==== Spirostreptida ====
===== Spirostreptidae =====
- Doratogonus furculifer
- Doratogonus infragilis
- Doratogonus minor
- Doratogonus rubipodus
- Doratogonus septentrionalis
- Doratogonus zuluensis
- Sechelleptus seychellarum

=== Insecta ===
==== Archaeognatha ====
===== Machilidae =====
- Trigoniophthalmus borgesi

==== Blattodea ====
===== Blattellidae =====
- Hololeptoblatta minor
- Miriamrothschildia aldabrensis
- Miriamrothschildia biplagiata
- Miriamrothschildia mahensis
- Theganopteryx lunulata
- Theganopteryx minuta

===== Nocticolidae =====
- Nocticola gerlachi

==== Coleoptera ====
===== Anthicidae =====
- Anthicus sacramento

===== Anthribidae =====
- Acarodes gutta
- Homoeodera coriacea
- Homoeodera globulosa
- Valenfriesia aenea
- Valenfriesia bewicki
- Valenfriesia dalei
- Valenfriesia grayii
- Valenfriesia rufopicta
- Valenfriesia subfasciata

===== Buprestidae =====
- Buprestis splendens

===== Carabidae =====
- Cedrorum azoricus
- Eustra honchongensis
- Trechus picoensis
- Trechus terrabravensis

===== Cerambycidae =====
- Anaglyptus luteofasciatus
- Anaglyptus praecellens
- Callidium libani
- Crotchiella brachyptera
- Drymochares cylindraceus
- Drymochares truquii
- Glaphyra bassettii
- Glaphyra tenuitarsis
- Isotomus jarmilae
- Isotomus theresae
- Neomarius gandolphii
- Poecilium gudenzii
- Poecilium kasnaki
- Pseudogaurotina excellens
- Pseudomyrmecion ramalinum
- Pseudosphegesthes bergeri
- Ropalopus ungaricus
- Semanotus algiricus
- Vesperella maroccana
- Xylotoles costatus

===== Cicindelidae =====
- Cicindela columbica
- Cicindela puritana

===== Ciidae =====
- Atlantocis gillerforsi

===== Cleridae =====
- Opilo orocastaneus

===== Cucujidae =====
- Cucujus tulliae

===== Curculionidae =====
- Calacalles droueti
- Drouetius azoricus
- Drouetius borgesi
- Drouetius oceanicus
- Gymnopholus lichenifer
- Phloeosinus gillerforsi
- Pseudechinosoma nodosum

===== Dytiscidae =====
- Agabus clypealis
- Agabus discicollis
- Agabus godmanni
- Agabus hozgargantae
- Deronectes aljibensis
- Graptodytes delectus
- Hydroporus guernei
- Hydrotarsus pilosus
- Rhantus alutaceus
- Rhithrodytes agnus

===== Elateridae =====
- Ampedus assingi
- Ampedus quadrisignatus
- Ampedus rifensis
- Athous azoricus
- Heteroderes azoricus
- Limoniscus violaceus
- Stenagostus sardiniensis

===== Erotylidae =====
- Triplax castanea
- Triplax emgei

===== Geotrupidae =====
- Ceratophyus martinezi
- Ceratophyus rossii
- Thorectes balearicus
- Thorectes baraudi
- Thorectes castillanus
- Thorectes catalonicus
- Thorectes chersinus
- Thorectes coiffaiti
- Thorectes distinctus
- Thorectes hernandezi
- Thorectes hispanus
- Thorectes orocantabricus
- Thorectes punctatissimus
- Thorectes punctatolineatus
- Thorectes puncticollis
- Thorectes sardous
- Thorectes variolipennis
- Typhaeus hiostius
- Typhaeus momus

===== Latridiidae =====
- Metophthalmus occidentalis

===== Lucanidae =====
- Colophon barnardi
- Colophon eastmani
- Colophon haughtoni
- Colophon thunbergi
- Colophon whitei
- Dorcus alexisi

===== Scarabaeidae =====
- Ahermodontus ambrosi
- Ateuchus ambiguus
- Calicnemis latreillei
- Calicnemis obesa sardiniensis
- Canthonella gomezi
- Cheirotonus jambar
- Cryptocanthon altus
- Cryptocanthon nebulinus
- Cryptocanthon punctatus
- Dichotomius eucranioides
- Dichotomius schiffleri
- Endroedyolus paradoxus
- Gnorimus baborensis
- Gnorimus decempunctatus
- Heptaulacus gadetinus
- Mellissius adumbratus
- Nimbus anyerae
- Onoreidium howdeni
- Onthophagus aureofuscus
- Osmoderma cristinae
- Osmoderma italica
- Osmoderma lassallei
- Proagoderus uluguru
- Sarophorus punctatus
- Scybalocanthon arcabuquensis

===== Staphylinidae =====
- Euconnus azoricus
- Phloeostiba azorica

===== Tenebrionidae =====
- Allecula suberina
- Corticeus bicoloroides
- Corticeus vanmeeri
- Corticeus versipellis
- Harvengia vietnamita
- Mycetochara flavipennis

===== Trogossitidae =====
- Leipaspis pinicola

===== Zopheridae =====
- Diodesma besucheti
- Pycnomerus italicus
- Tarphius azoricus
- Tarphius besucheti
- Tarphius furtadoi
- Tarphius tornvalli

==== Dermaptera ====
===== Carcinophoridae =====
- Anisolabis scotti

==== Diptera ====
===== Blephariceridae =====
- Edwardsina gigantea

===== Psychodidae =====
- Nemapalpus nearcticus

==== Ephemeroptera ====
===== Oniscigastridae =====
- Tasmanophlebia lacuscoerulei

==== Grylloblattodea ====
===== Grylloblattidae =====
- Namkungia biryongensis

==== Hemiptera ====
===== Cicadellidae =====
- Aphrodes hamiltoni

===== Cixiidae =====
- Cixius azofloresi
- Cixius azomariae
- Cixius azopicavus

===== Psyllidae =====
- Acizzia mccarthyi

==== Hymenoptera ====
===== Andrenidae =====
- Andrena stepposa
- Flavipanurgus granadensis

===== Apidae =====
- Ammobates melectoides
- Bombus brachycephalus
- Bombus crotchii
- Bombus dahlbomii
- Bombus fraternus
- Bombus haueri
- Bombus inexspectatus
- Bombus reinigiellus
- Bombus steindachneri

===== Colletidae =====
- Colletes merceti
- Colletes sierrensis
- Colletes wolfi

===== Halictidae =====
- Halictus carinthiacus
- Halictus microcardia
- Lasioglossum breviventre

===== Melittidae =====
- Dasypoda frieseana

==== Lepidoptera ====
===== Argyresthiidae =====
- Argyresthia minusculella

===== Gelechiidae =====
- Brachmia infuscatella

===== Gracillariidae =====
- Micrurapteryx bistrigella

===== Hesperiidae =====
- Ocybadistes knightorum

===== Lycaenidae =====
- Acrodipsas illidgei
- Aloeides nubilus
- Arawacus aethesa
- Joiceya praeclarus
- Nirodia belphegor
- Orachrysops niobe
- Oxychaeta dicksoni
- Paralucia spinifera
- Plebejus vogelii
- Plebejus zullichi
- Poecilmitis rileyi
- Poecilmitis swanepoeli
- Polyommatus dama
- Polyommatus humedasae
- Polyommatus theresiae
- Pseudophilotes fatma
- Trimenia wallengrenii

===== Noctuidae =====
- Graphania granti

===== Nymphalidae =====
- Amauris comorana
- Arethusana aksouali
- Euploea albicosta
- Euploea caespes
- Euploea mitra
- Euploea tripunctata
- Hipparchia christenseni
- Hipparchia sbordonii
- Ideopsis hewitsonii
- Lasiommata meadewaldoi
- Maniola halicarnassus
- Parantica kuekenthali
- Parantica marcia
- Parantica milagros
- Parantica schoenigi
- Parantica sulewattan
- Parantica timorica
- Pararge xiphia
- Pseudochazara amymone
- Pseudochazara euxina
- Tiradelphe schneideri

===== Papilionidae =====
- Graphium levassori
- Graphium sandawanum
- Ornithoptera alexandrae
- Papilio aristophontes
- Papilio chikae
- Papilio homerus
- Papilio moerneri

===== Pieridae =====
- Gonepteryx maderensis
- Pieris cheiranthi

===== Sphingidae =====
- Tinostoma smaragditis

===== Stathmopodidae =====
- Neomariania scriptella

===== Tineidae =====
- Eudarcia atlantica

==== Mantodea ====
===== Mantidae =====
- Pseudoyersinia canariensis

==== Odonata ====
===== Aeshnidae =====
- Acanthaeschna victoria
- Austroaeschna ingrid
- Austroaeschna muelleri
- Boyeria cretensis
- Planaeschna ishigakiana ishigakiana
- Planaeschna ishigakiana nagaminei
- Planaeschna risi sakishimana
- Rhionaeschna caligo
- Rhionaeschna galapagoensis
- Sarasaeschna kunigamiensis
- Staurophlebia bosqi

===== Argiolestidae =====
- Allolestes maclachlanii
- Nesolestes pauliani

===== Austropetaliidae =====
- Phyllopetalia altarensis

===== Calopterygidae =====
- Caliphaea angka
- Calopteryx exul
- Calopteryx hyalina
- Calopteryx syriaca
- Matrona japonica
- Sapho puella
- Umma mesumbei
- Umma purpurea

===== Chlorocyphidae =====
- Africocypha centripunctata
- Africocypha varicolor
- Chlorocypha schmidti
- Libellago balus
- Platycypha auripes
- Platycypha inyangae
- Rhinocypha hageni
- Rhinocypha orea
- Rhinocypha uenoi
- Stenocypha hasta

===== Chlorogomphidae =====
- Chlorogomphus brunneus brunneus
- Chlorogomphus okinawensis

===== Coenagrionidae =====
- Acanthagrion williamsoni
- Aciagrion fasciculare
- Agriocnemis ruberrima ruberrima
- Ceriagrion citrinum
- Coenagriocnemis insularis
- Coenagriocnemis rufipes
- Drepanoneura donnellyi
- Ischnura gemina
- Mesamphiagrion demarmelsi
- Mesamphiagrion gaudiimontanum
- Mesamphiagrion nataliae
- Mesamphiagrion santainense
- Microneura caligata
- Oreocnemis phoenix
- Proischnura polychromatica
- Pseudagrion arabicum
- Pseudagrion torridum hulae
- Pseudagrion vumbaense
- Telebasis flammeola

===== Cordulegastridae =====
- Cordulegaster helladica
- Cordulegaster helladica buchholzi
- Cordulegaster helladica helladica
- Cordulegaster sarracenia

===== Corduliidae =====
- Hemicordulia apoensis
- Hemicordulia mindana nipponica
- Hemicordulia ogasawarensis
- Procordulia lompobatang

===== Euphaeidae =====
- Bayadera ishigakiana

===== Gomphidae =====
- Asiagomphus amamiensis amamiensis
- Asiagomphus amamiensis okinawanus
- Asiagomphus coreanus
- Asiagomphus yayeyamensis
- Epigomphus armatus
- Epigomphus camelus
- Epigomphus clavatus
- Epigomphus corniculatus
- Epigomphus donnellyi
- Epigomphus flinti
- Epigomphus houghtoni
- Epigomphus maya
- Epigomphus paulsoni
- Epigomphus subsimilis
- Epigomphus sulcatistyla
- Epigomphus verticicornis
- Epigomphus westfalli
- Gomphidia kelloggi
- Gomphidia pearsoni
- Hemigomphus cooloola
- Microgomphus wijaya
- Notogomphus cottarellii
- Notogomphus maathaiae
- Notogomphus ruppeli
- Progomphus risi
- Progomphus tennesseni
- Progomphus zephyrus
- Stylogomphus ryukyuanus asatol
- Stylogomphus ryukyuanus watanabei

===== Hemiphlebiidae =====
- Hemiphlebia mirabilis

===== Heteragrionidae =====
- Heteragrion calendulum

===== Hypolestidae =====
- Hypolestes clara

===== Lestidae =====
- Lestes auripennis

===== Lestoideidae =====
- Lestoidea lewisiana

===== Libellulidae =====
- Acisoma ascalaphoides
- Aethiothemis gamblesi
- Aethiothemis modesta
- Hylaeothemis fruhstorferi
- Leucorrhinia intermedia ijimai
- Micrathyria coropinae
- Neodythemis munyaga
- Orthetrum poecilops miyajimaense
- Sympetrum maculatum
- Tetrathemis yerburii
- Thalassothemis marchali
- Urothemis thomasi
- Urothemis thomasi thomasi

===== Macromiidae =====
- Macromia kubokaiya

===== Megapodagrionidae =====
- Sciotropis lattkei

===== Not Assigned =====
- Idionyx galeata
- Nesocordulia villiersi
- Rhipidolestes okinawanus
- Syncordulia serendipator

===== Petaluridae =====
- Petalura pulcherrima

===== Philogeniidae =====
- Philogenia monotis

===== Platycnemididae =====
- Allocnemis mitwabae
- Allocnemis montana
- Allocnemis vicki
- Arabineura khalidi
- Coeliccia flavicauda masakii
- Coeliccia ryukyuensis amamii
- Coeliccia ryukyuensis ryukyuensis
- Elattoneura caesia
- Elattoneura oculata
- Mesocnemis tisi
- Metacnemis valida
- Nososticta pilbara
- Risiocnemis antoniae
- Spesbona angusta

===== Platystictidae =====
- Drepanosticta ceratophora
- Palaemnema baltodanoi
- Palaemnema chiriquita
- Palaemnema melanota
- Palaemnema orientalis
- Palaemnema reventazoni
- Sulcosticta striata

===== Synlestidae =====
- Chlorolestes apricans
- Phylolestes ethelae

==== Orthoptera ====
===== Acrididae =====
- Acanthoxia aculeus
- Acteana alazonica
- Afrophlaeoba euthynota
- Afrophlaeoba longicornis
- Afrophlaeoba nguru
- Arcyptera alzonai
- Aresceutica morogorica
- Aresceutica subnuda
- Chorthippus ferdinandi
- Chorthippus nevadensis
- Chorthippus relicticus
- Chortopodisma cobellii
- Dociostaurus minutus
- Enoplotettix gardineri
- Eupropacris pompalis
- Hadrolecocatantops uvinza
- Italohippus albicornis
- Italohippus monticola
- Italopodisma fiscellana
- Italopodisma samnitica
- Italopodisma trapezoidalis
- Liladownsia fraile
- Ochrilidia nuragica
- Ochrilidia sicula
- Omocestus navasi
- Omocestus uhagonii
- Omocestus uvarovi
- Oropodisma chelmosi
- Oropodisma karavica
- Oropodisma parnassica
- Oropodisma tymphrestosi
- Peripodisma tymphii
- Phymeurus kisuluensis
- Phymeurus lomaensis
- Phymeurus morotoensis
- Platypygius crassus
- Podisma goidanichi
- Podisma ruffoi
- Pseudoprumna baldensis
- Pternoscirtus aldabrae
- Sphingonotus almeriense
- Sphingonotus nodulosus
- Sphingonotus personatus
- Sphingonotus picteti
- Sphingonotus rugosus
- Sphingonotus uvarovi
- Stenobothrus clavatus
- Trimerotropis infantilis
- Trimerotropis occidentaloides
- Trimerotropis occulens

===== Dericorythidae =====
- Dericorys carthagonovae

===== Euschmidtiidae =====
- Chromomastax jagoi
- Euschmidtia fitzgeraldi
- Euschmidtia tangana

===== Gryllidae =====
- Oecanthus laricis
- Orthoxiphus nigrifrons
- Phaeogryllus fuscus
- Phaloria insularis insularis
- Seychellesia longicercata
- Seychellesia patellifera

===== Lentulidae =====
- Betiscoides meridionalis
- Betiscoides parva
- Betiscoides sjostedti

===== Mogoplistidae =====
- Arachnocephalus subsulcatus
- Ectatoderus aldabrae
- Ectatoderus nigriceps
- Ectatoderus squamiger
- Ornebius stenus
- Ornebius syrticus
- Pseudomogoplistes byzantius

===== Pamphagidae =====
- Acrostira tamarani
- Acrostira tenerifae
- Asiotmethis tauricus
- Glyphanus obtusus
- Kurtharzia sulcata
- Orchamus gracilis
- Orchamus kaltenbachi
- Paranocaracris bulgaricus
- Paranocarodes chopardi
- Prionotropis azami
- Prionotropis willemsorum
- Purpuraria erna
- Purpuraria magna

===== Pneumoridae =====
- Physemacris papillosa
- Physophorina livingstonii
- Physophorina miranda
- Prostalia granulata

===== Tetrigidae =====
- Amphinotus nymphula
- Amphinotus pupulus
- Charagotettix longispinis
- Charagotettix lucubensis
- Cryptotettix macrophthalmus
- Cryptotettix spinilobus
- Eurybiades cerastes
- Hovacris undulata
- Hybotettix humeralis
- Lepocranus fuscus
- Notocerus cornutus
- Procytettix thalassanax
- Tetrix transsylvanica

===== Tettigoniidae =====
- Amedegnatiana vicheti
- Anadrymadusa retowskii
- Anonconotus italoaustriacus
- Anonconotus ligustinus
- Anonconotus sibyllinus
- Aroegas fuscus
- Baetica ustulata
- Bradyporus macrogaster
- Brinckiella arboricola
- Bucephaloptera cypria
- Calliphona alluaudi
- Calliphona gomerensis
- Calliphona palmensis
- Conocephalus basutoanus
- Conocephalus chavesi
- Conocephalus ebneri
- Conocephalus vaginalis
- Ctenodecticus lusitanicus
- Ephippiger melisi
- Ephippiger ruffoi
- Ephippiger zelleri
- Ephippigerida asella
- Ephippigerida rosae
- Eupholidoptera astyla
- Eupholidoptera spinigera
- Isophya ciucasi
- Isophya hospodar
- Isophya longicaudata longicaudata
- Isophya mavromoustakisi
- Isophya nagyi
- Isophya sicula
- Isophya stepposa
- Isophya zubowskii
- Kawanaphila pachomai
- Metrioptera buyssoni
- Metrioptera prenjica
- Pachytrachis frater
- Parnassiana chelmos
- Parnassiana tymphiensis
- Parnassiana tymphrestos
- Peringueyella rentzi
- Pholidoptera lucasi
- Poecilimon ebneri
- Poecilimon gracilioides
- Poecilimon paros
- Poecilimon pindos
- Poecilimon soulion
- Polysarcus scutatus
- Psacadonotus insulanus
- Pterolepis elymica
- Rhacocleis buchichii
- Rhacocleis japygia
- Rhacocleis maculipedes
- Sabaterpia hispanica
- Seselphisis visenda
- Tessellana nigrosignata
- Thoracistus jambila
- Thoracistus semeniphagus
- Thoracistus thyraeus
- Throscodectes xederoides
- Throscodectes xiphos
- Zeuneriana amplipennis
- Zeuneriana marmorata

===== Trigonidiidae =====
- Metioche bolivari
- Scottiola salticiformis
- Zarceus major

==== Phasmatodea ====
===== Phasmatidae =====
- Graeffea seychellensis

=== Malacostraca ===
==== Amphipoda ====
===== Crangonyctidae =====
- Crangonyx dearolfi
- Stygobromus hayi
- Stygobromus pecki

===== Gammaridae =====
- Gammarus acherondytes

===== Niphargidae =====
- Niphargus elegans zagrebensis

===== Paramelitidae =====
- Paramelita barnardi

===== Talitridae =====
- Spelaeorchestia kiloana

==== Decapoda ====
===== Alpheidae =====
- Alpheus cyanoteles
- Potamalpheops amnicus
- Potamalpheops haugi

===== Astacidae =====
- Austropotamobius pallipes

===== Atyidae =====
- Atya intermedia
- Caridina annandalei
- Caridina dennerli
- Caridina glaubrechti
- Caridina holthuisi
- Caridina lanceolata
- Caridina lingkonae
- Caridina loehae
- Caridina maculata
- Caridina masapi
- Caridina mindanao
- Caridina parvula
- Caridina profundicola
- Caridina spinata
- Caridina spongicola
- Caridina striata
- Caridina tenuirostris
- Caridina thermophila
- Caridina woltereckae
- Dugastella marocana
- Palaemonias alabamae
- Sinodina gregoriana
- Syncaris pacifica

===== Cambaridae =====
- Cambarellus patzcuarensis
- Cambarus cracens
- Cambarus cymatilis
- Cambarus harti
- Cambarus pecki
- Cambarus speleocoopi
- Fallicambarus petilicarpus
- Hobbseus orconectoides
- Hobbseus valleculus
- Hobbseus yalobushensis
- Orconectes jeffersoni
- Orconectes packardi
- Orconectes pardalotus
- Orconectes shoupi
- Procambarus acherontis
- Procambarus apalachicolae
- Procambarus bouvieri
- Procambarus brazoriensis
- Procambarus cometes
- Procambarus contrerasi
- Procambarus digueti
- Procambarus econfinae
- Procambarus erythrops
- Procambarus escambiensis
- Procambarus franzi
- Procambarus horsti
- Procambarus hortonhobbsi
- Procambarus leitheuseri
- Procambarus lucifugus lucifugus
- Procambarus lylei
- Procambarus milleri
- Procambarus orcinus
- Procambarus roberti
- Procambarus zihuateutlensis

===== Desmocarididae =====
- Desmocaris bislineata

===== Euryrhynchidae =====
- Euryrhynchina edingtonae

===== Gecarcinucidae =====
- Ceylonthelphusa alpina
- Ceylonthelphusa armata
- Ceylonthelphusa cavatrix
- Ceylonthelphusa diva
- Coccusa cristicervix
- Geithusa pulchra
- Irmengardia didacta
- Irmengardia nemestrinus
- Lepidothelphusa cognetti
- Migmathelphusa olivacea
- Oziotelphusa dakuna
- Oziotelphusa gallicola
- Oziotelphusa populosa
- Parathelphusa batamensis
- Parathelphusa nagasakti
- Pastilla dacuna
- Phricotelphusa gracilipes
- Salangathelphusa anophrys
- Sayamia melanodactylus
- Siamthelphusa holthuisi
- Somanniathelphusa taiwanensis
- Somanniathelphusa zanklon
- Spiralothelphusa fernandoi
- Spiralothelphusa parvula
- Sundathelphusa sottoae
- Terrathelphusa kuchingensis
- Thaksinthelphusa yongchindaratae

===== Palaemonidae =====
- Arachnochium kulsiense
- Calathaemon holthuisi
- Macrobrachium hirtimanus
- Macrobrachium lamarrei lamarroides
- Macrobrachium minutum
- Macrobrachium naso
- Macrobrachium poeti
- Palaemonetes antrorum
- Palaemonetes suttkusi

===== Parastacidae =====
- Astacopsis gouldi
- Cherax pallidus
- Engaeus disjuncticus
- Engaeus martigener
- Engaeus phyllocercus
- Engaewa reducta
- Engaewa walpolea
- Euastacus balanesis
- Euastacus bidawalis
- Euastacus brachythorax
- Euastacus clarkae
- Euastacus claytoni
- Euastacus crassus
- Euastacus diversus
- Euastacus fleckeri
- Euastacus gumar
- Euastacus hirsutus
- Euastacus hystricosus
- Euastacus maccai
- Euastacus neodiversus
- Euastacus pilosus
- Euastacus polysetosus
- Euastacus rieki
- Euastacus spinichelatus
- Euastacus urospinosus
- Tenuibranchiurus glypticus

===== Pinnotheridae =====
- Parapinnixa affinis

===== Potamidae =====
- Doimon doichiangdao
- Doimon doisutep
- Geothelphusa levicervix
- Geothelphusa yangminshan
- Hainanpotamon orientale
- Ibanum pilimanus
- Indochinamon bhumibol
- Indochinamon villosum
- Iomon nan
- Johora punicea
- Stoliczia chaseni

===== Potamonautidae =====
- Afrithelphusa monodosa
- Boreathelphusa uglowi
- Globonautes macropus
- Liberonautes nanoides
- Liberonautes rubigimanus
- Louisea balssi
- Louisea edeaensis
- Potamonautes gonocristatus
- Potamonautes idjiwiensis
- Potamonautes mutandensis
- Potamonautes platycentron

===== Pseudothelphusidae =====
- Hypolobocera exuca
- Tehuana lamothei
- Tehuana poglayenorum
- Typhlopseudothelphusa mocinoi

===== Trichodactylidae =====
- Trichodactylus crassus

===== Typhlocarididae =====
- Typhlocaris ayyaloni
- Typhlocaris galilea

==== Isopoda ====
===== Asellidae =====
- Asellus aquaticus carniolicus
- Asellus aquaticus cyclobranchialis
- Caecidotea barri
- Lirceus usdagalun

===== Cirolanidae =====
- Speocirolana thermydronis
- Sphaerolana affinis
- Sphaerolana interstitialis

===== Philosciidae =====
- Burmoniscus sp. nov. 'HC - first segment white'

===== Sphaeromatidae =====
- Monolistra bolei
- Monolistra racovitzai conopyge
- Monolistra spinosissima
- Thermosphaeroma milleri

===== Stenasellidae =====
- Mexistenasellus coahuila

== Chordata ==
=== Actinopterygii ===
==== Acipenseriformes ====
===== Acipenseridae =====
- Acipenser baerii
- Acipenser transmontanus (Kootenai River subpopulation)
- Scaphirhynchus albus

==== Anguilliformes ====
===== Anguillidae =====
- Anguilla japonica
- Anguilla rostrata

==== Atheriniformes ====
===== Atherinidae =====
- Craterocephalus fluviatilis
- Poblana letholepis
- Poblana squamata
- Teramulus waterloti

===== Atherinopsidae =====
- Chirostoma attenuatum
- Chirostoma promelas
- Colpichthys hubbsi
- Menidia colei
- Menidia conchorum

===== Bedotiidae =====
- Bedotia albomarginata
- Bedotia geayi
- Bedotia leucopteron
- Bedotia longianalis
- Bedotia madagascariensis
- Bedotia marojejy
- Rheocles alaotrensis
- Rheocles vatosoa
- Rheocles wrightae

===== Melanotaeniidae =====
- Melanotaenia boesemani

===== Phallostethidae =====
- Neostethus thessa

===== Pseudomugilidae =====
- Pseudomugil mellis

==== Batrachoidiformes ====
===== Batrachoididae =====
- Sanopus reticulatus
- Sanopus splendidus

==== Beloniformes ====
===== Adrianichthyidae =====
- Oryzias orthognathus
- Xenopoecilus oophorus
- Xenopoecilus sarasinorum

===== Hemiramphidae =====
- Nomorhamphus towoetii

==== Characiformes ====
===== Alestidae =====
- Alestes bouboni
- Alestopetersius nigropterus
- Brycinus bartoni
- Ladigesia roloffi

===== Bryconidae =====
- Brycon labiatus

===== Characidae =====
- Astyanax daguae
- Creagrutus nigrostigmatus
- Gymnocharacinus bergii
- Oligosarcus schindleri

===== Curimatidae =====
- Pseudocurimata patiae

===== Distichodontidae =====
- Nannocharax altus
- Neolebias axelrodi
- Neolebias kerguennae

===== Parodontidae =====
- Parodon alfonsoi

==== Clupeiformes ====
===== Clupeidae =====
- Alosa volgensis
- Nannothrissa stewarti
- Sauvagella robusta

===== Engraulidae =====
- Anchoa choerostoma

==== Cypriniformes ====
===== Balitoridae =====
- Barbatula samantica
- Barbatula tschaiyssuensis
- Homaloptera montana
- Homaloptera santhamparaiensis
- Longischistura striatus
- Nemacheilus jordanicus
- Nemacheilus pantheroides
- Nemacheilus petrubanarescui
- Nemacheilus pulchellus
- Nemacheilus sp. nov.
- Nemachilichthys shimogensis
- Oxynoemacheilus anatolicus
- Oxynoemacheilus ercisianus
- Oxynoemacheilus hamwii
- Oxynoemacheilus mesudae
- Oxynoemacheilus panthera
- Oxynoemacheilus paucilepis
- Oxynoemacheilus seyhanicola
- Schistura bairdi
- Schistura bolavenensis
- Schistura kangjupkhulensis
- Schistura minutus
- Schistura nagodiensis
- Schistura nudidorsum
- Schistura pridii
- Schistura quasimodo
- Schistura reticulata
- Schistura sijuensis
- Schistura thanho
- Schistura tigrinum
- Sewellia marmorata
- Sewellia patella
- Sewellia pterolineata
- Travancoria elongata
- Travancoria jonesi
- Yunnanilus nigromaculatus

===== Catostomidae =====
- Catostomus santaanae
- Catostomus warnerensis
- Chasmistes brevirostris
- Chasmistes cujus
- Deltistes luxatus
- Moxostoma hubbsi
- Moxostoma robustum

===== Cobitidae =====
- Botia striata
- Cobitis arachthosensis
- Cobitis battalgili
- Cobitis bilseli
- Cobitis calderoni
- Cobitis evreni
- Cobitis hellenica
- Cobitis levantina
- Cobitis phrygica
- Cobitis puncticulata
- Cobitis trichonica
- Cobitis turcica
- Cobitis vettonica
- Lepidocephalichthys arunachalensis
- Lepidocephalichthys jonklaasi
- Paralepidocephalus yui
- Yasuhikotakia sidthimunki

===== Cyprinidae =====
- Achondrostoma occidentale
- Achondrostoma salmantinum
- Alburnus attalus
- Alburnus baliki
- Alburnus carinatus
- Alburnus mentoides
- Alburnus qalilus
- Alburnus sarmaticus
- Alburnus schischkovi
- Alburnus volviticus
- Anabarilius alburnops
- Anabarilius polylepis
- Anaecypris hispanica
- Aulopyge huegelii
- Balantiocheilos melanopterus
- Barbodes palaemophagus
- Barbus caninus
- Barbus thysi
- Barbus traorei
- Barilius canarensis
- Capoeta barroisi
- Capoeta mauricii
- Carasobarbus apoensis
- Carasobarbus exulatus
- Chondrostoma beysehirense
- Chondrostoma fahirae
- Chondrostoma kinzelbachi
- Chondrostoma phoxinus
- Chondrostoma soetta
- Chrosomus cumberlandensis
- Chrosomus saylori
- Crossocheilus klatti
- Crossocheilus periyarensis
- Cyprinella caerulea
- Cyprinella lepida
- Cyprinella panarcys
- Cyprinella xanthicara
- Cyprinus chilia
- Cyprinus intha
- Danio erythromicron
- Dawkinsia arulius
- Dawkinsia exclamatio
- Dawkinsia tambraparniei
- Devario auropurpureus
- Devario horai
- Devario neilgherriensis
- Devario pathirana
- Dionda diaboli
- Eechathalakenda ophicephalus
- Enteromius aliciae
- Enteromius bawkuensis
- Enteromius bourdariei
- Enteromius huguenyi
- Enteromius lauzannei
- Enteromius liberiensis
- Enteromius nigroluteus
- Enteromius quadralineatus
- Enteromius stauchi
- Enteromius subinensis
- Enteromius sylvaticus
- Erimystax cahni
- Folifer yunnanensis
- Garra dunsirei
- Garra ghorensis
- Garra hughi
- Garra kalakadensis
- Garra lautior
- Garra mamshuqa
- Garra surendranathanii
- Gila cypha
- Gila intermedia
- Gila seminuda
- Gobio intermedius
- Gobio maeandricus
- Gobio skadarensis
- Gymnostomus horai
- Hemigrammocapoeta kemali
- Horalabiosa joshuai
- Hybognathus amarus
- Hypselobarbus curmuca
- Hypselobarbus dubius
- Hypselobarbus micropogon
- Hypselobarbus mussullah
- Hypselobarbus periyarensis
- Iotichthys phlegethontis
- Labeo alluaudi
- Labeo fisheri
- Labeo mesops
- Labeo potail
- Labeo seeberi
- Labeobarbus ethiopicus
- Labeobarbus macrophtalmus
- Labeobarbus mbami
- Labeobarbus mungoensis
- Labeobarbus roylii
- Laubuca caeruleostigmata
- Lepidomeda vittata
- Lepidopygopsis typus
- Luciobarbus graecus
- Luciobarbus longiceps
- Luciocyprinus striolatus
- Macrhybopsis tetranema
- Meda fulgida
- Microrasbora rubescens
- Notropis albizonatus
- Notropis cahabae
- Notropis mekistocholas
- Notropis simus
- Onychostoma alticorpus
- Opsaridium microlepis
- Osteochilus longidorsalis
- Parachondrostoma turiense
- Parapsilorhynchus elongatus
- Pelasgus prespensis
- Pethia manipurensis
- Pethia sharmai
- Phoxinellus alepidotus
- Phoxinellus anatolicus
- Phoxinus strandjae
- Phoxinus strymonicus
- Poropuntius bolovenensis
- Poropuntius consternans
- Poropuntius deauratus
- Poropuntius lobocheiloides
- Poropuntius solitus
- Probarbus jullieni
- Probarbus labeamajor
- Pseudobarbus afer
- Pseudobarbus burgi
- Pseudobarbus capensis
- Pseudobarbus phlegethon
- Pseudobarbus quathlambae
- Pseudobarbus skeltoni
- Pseudobarbus sp. nov. 'keiskamma'
- Pseudobarbus trevelyani
- Pseudobarbus verloreni
- Pseudophoxinus alii
- Pseudophoxinus anatolicus
- Pseudophoxinus burduricus
- Pseudophoxinus crassus
- Pseudophoxinus drusensis
- Pseudophoxinus egridiri
- Pseudophoxinus evliyae
- Pseudophoxinus fahrettini
- Pseudophoxinus firati
- Pseudophoxinus hittitorum
- Pseudophoxinus maeandri
- Pseudophoxinus punicus
- Puntius cauveriensis
- Puntius crescentus
- Puntius fraseri
- Rasbora wilpita
- Romanogobio benacensis
- Rutilus meidingeri
- Rutilus ylikiensis
- Sahyadria chalakkudiensis
- Sahyadria denisonii
- Sawbwa resplendens
- Scardinius elmaliensis
- Schismatorhynchos nukta
- Schizothorax lepidothorax
- Sinocyclocheilus tingi
- Squalius carinus
- Squalius castellanus
- Squalius keadicus
- Squalius kosswigi
- Squalius lucumonis
- Squalius malacitanus
- Squalius microlepis
- Squalius moreoticus
- Squalius tenellus
- Squalius torgalensis
- Systomus asoka
- Systomus martenstyni
- Telestes beoticus
- Telestes croaticus
- Telestes sp. nov.
- Thynnichthys sandkhol
- Tor khudree
- Tor kulkarnii
- Tor malabaricus
- Tor putitora

===== Ellopostomatidae =====
- Ellopostoma mystax

===== Psilorhynchidae =====
- Psilorhynchus microphthalmus

==== Cyprinodontiformes ====
===== Aplocheilidae =====
- Pachypanchax omalonota
- Pachypanchax patriciae
- Pachypanchax sakaramyi
- Pachypanchax sparksorum
- Pachypanchax varatraza

===== Cyprinodontidae =====
- Aphanius baeticus
- Aphanius burduricus
- Aphanius dispar richardsoni
- Aphanius iberus
- Aphanius stiassnyae
- Aphanius sureyanus
- Crenichthys baileyi
- Cualac tessellatus
- Cyprinodon beltrani
- Cyprinodon elegans
- Cyprinodon eremus
- Cyprinodon fontinalis
- Cyprinodon macrolepis
- Cyprinodon maya
- Cyprinodon radiosus
- Cyprinodon salinus
- Cyprinodon simus
- Cyprinodon tularosa
- Orestias gymnota
- Orestias polonorum

===== Fundulidae =====
- Fundulus julisia
- Fundulus persimilis

===== Goodeidae =====
- Ataeniobius toweri
- Characodon lateralis
- Xenoophorus captivus

===== Nothobranchiidae =====
- Aphyosemion alpha
- Aphyosemion amoenum
- Aphyosemion bamilekorum
- Aphyosemion bualanum
- Aphyosemion celiae celiae
- Aphyosemion franzwerneri
- Aphyosemion fulgens
- Aphyosemion lugens
- Aphyosemion passaroi
- Aphyosemion poliaki
- Aphyosemion tirbaki
- Aphyosemion volcanum
- Epiplatys biafranus
- Epiplatys chaperi schreiberi
- Epiplatys etzeli
- Epiplatys fasciolatus tototaensis
- Epiplatys fasciolatus zimiensis
- Epiplatys lokoensis
- Epiplatys njalaensis
- Epiplatys olbrechtsi azureus
- Epiplatys olbrechtsi dauresi
- Epiplatys olbrechtsi puetzi
- Epiplatys roloffi
- Fundulopanchax amieti
- Fundulopanchax arnoldi
- Fundulopanchax cinnamomeus
- Fundulopanchax fallax
- Fundulopanchax gardneri mamfensis
- Fundulopanchax marmoratus
- Fundulopanchax oeseri
- Fundulopanchax rubrolabialis
- Fundulopanchax scheeli
- Nimbapanchax jeanpoli
- Nothobranchius polli
- Nothobranchius rosenstocki
- Nothobranchius sagittae
- Nothobranchius symoensi
- Scriptaphyosemion bertholdi
- Scriptaphyosemion brueningi

===== Poeciliidae =====
- Gambusia dominicensis
- Gambusia nobilis
- Plataplochilus chalcopyrus
- Plataplochilus terveri
- Poropanchax myersi
- Xiphophorus gordoni
- Xiphophorus meyeri

===== Profundulidae =====
- Tlaloc hildebrandi

===== Rivulidae =====
- Austrofundulus myersi
- Austrolebias viarius

==== Gadiformes ====
===== Merlucciidae =====
- Merluccius senegalensis

==== Gasterosteiformes ====
===== Gasterosteidae =====
- Pungitius stenurus

==== Gobiesociformes ====
===== Gobiesocidae =====
- Tomicodon abuelorum

==== Gonorynchiformes ====
===== Kneriidae =====
- Kneria sp. nov. 'South Africa'

==== Gymnotiformes ====
===== Gymnotidae =====
- Gymnotus ardilai

==== Mugiliformes ====
===== Mugilidae =====
- Liza luciae

==== Ophidiiformes ====
===== Bythitidae =====
- Lucifuga lucayana
- Ogilbichthys ferocis

==== Osmeriformes ====
===== Galaxiidae =====
- Galaxias divergens
- Galaxias neocaledonicus
- Galaxias postvectis
- Galaxias sp. nov. 'Breede'
- Galaxias sp. nov. 'Heuningnes'
- Galaxias sp. nov. 'Klein'
- Galaxias sp. nov. 'Verlorenvlei'
- Neochanna apoda
- Neochanna diversus

===== Plecoglossidae =====
- Plecoglossus altivelis ryukyuensis

==== Osteoglossiformes ====
===== Mormyridae =====
- Marcusenius caudisquamatus
- Marcusenius meronai
- Marcusenius sp. nov. kosi
- Mormyrus subundulatus
- Stomatorhinus ivindoensis

===== Osteoglossidae =====
- Scleropages formosus

==== Perciformes ====
===== Anabantidae =====
- Sandelia bainsii

===== Apogonidae =====
- Pterapogon kauderni

===== Badidae =====
- Badis tuivaiei

===== Blenniidae =====
- Entomacrodus solus
- Lupinoblennius paivai

===== Centrarchidae =====
- Archoplites interruptus

===== Cichlidae =====
- Alcolapia alcalicus
- Amphilophus margaritifer
- Benitochromis conjunctus
- Benitochromis finleyi
- Benitochromis nigrodorsalis
- Benitochromis riomuniensis
- Benitochromis ufermanni
- Chetia brevis
- Chetia mola
- Chromidotilapia linkei
- Cichlasoma gephyrum
- Coptodon kottae
- Danakilia franchettii
- Etroplus canarensis
- Gobiocichla ethelwynnae
- Haplochromis desfontainii
- Haplochromis erythromaculatus
- Haplochromis igneopinnis
- Haplochromis simpsoni
- Haplochromis sp. nov. 'Blue Rockpicker'
- Haplochromis venator
- Hemichromis cerasogaster
- Herichthys labridens
- Katria katria
- Lamprologus tumbanus
- Lethrinops macracanthus
- Lethrinops micrentodon
- Lethrinops microdon
- Lethrinops stridae
- Limbochromis robertsi
- Nanochromis transvestitus
- Oreochromis alcalicus
- Oreochromis amphimelas
- Oreochromis karongae
- Oreochromis lepidurus
- Oreochromis lidole
- Oreochromis squamipinnis
- Orthochromis kasuluensis
- Orthochromis luongoensis
- Orthochromis mazimeroensis
- Orthochromis mosoensis
- Orthochromis rubrolabialis
- Oxylapia polli
- Parananochromis axelrodi
- Parananochromis ornatus
- Paretroplus lamenabe
- Paretroplus loisellei
- Paretroplus maromandia
- Paretroplus nourissati
- Paretroplus tsimoly
- Prognathochromis sp. nov. 'long snout'
- Ptychochromis inornatus
- Ptychochromis loisellei
- Ptychochromis oligacanthus
- Ptychochromis sp. nov. 'Green Garaka'
- Ptychochromoides vondrozo
- Serranochromis meridianus
- Tylochromis microdon

===== Cirrhitidae =====
- Amblycirrhitus earnshawi

===== Clinidae =====
- Clinus latipennis
- Clinus spatulatus
- Springeratus polyporatus

===== Eleotridae =====
- Kribia leonensis
- Typhleotris madagascariensis

===== Epinephelidae =====
- Epinephelus akaara
- Epinephelus marginatus
- Epinephelus striatus
- Mycteroperca fusca
- Mycteroperca jordani

===== Gobiidae =====
- Bathygobius burtoni
- Economidichthys trichonis
- Elacatinus atronasus
- Elacatinus cayman
- Elacatinus centralis
- Elacatinus jarocho
- Gobiosoma homochroma
- Gobiosoma spilotum
- Knipowitschia thessala
- Pomatoschistus tortonesei
- Ponticola rizensis
- Priolepis ascensionis
- Rhinogobius lineatus
- Sicyopterus eudentatus
- Sicyopterus rapa
- Sicyopterus sarasini
- Silhouettea sibayi
- Smilosicyopus sasali
- Stiphodon julieni
- Tigrigobius harveyi

===== Labridae =====
- Cheilinus undulatus
- Halichoeres burekae
- Halichoeres socialis
- Scarus trispinosus

===== Labrisomidae =====
- Paraclinus magdalenae

===== Latidae =====
- Lates angustifrons
- Lates macrophthalmus
- Lates microlepis

===== Malacanthidae =====
- Lopholatilus chamaeleonticeps

===== Odontobutidae =====
- Terateleotris aspro

===== Osphronemidae =====
- Betta livida
- Parosphromenus harveyi

===== Percichthyidae =====
- Maccullochella ikei
- Maccullochella macquariensis
- Nannoperca oxleyana

===== Percidae =====
- Etheostoma akatulo
- Etheostoma boschungi
- Etheostoma chienense
- Etheostoma ditrema
- Etheostoma fonticola
- Etheostoma moorei
- Etheostoma nuchale
- Etheostoma phytophilum
- Etheostoma rubrum
- Etheostoma scotti
- Etheostoma susanae
- Etheostoma tecumsehi
- Percina antesella
- Percina aurora
- Percina brevicauda
- Percina kusha
- Percina pantherina

===== Pomacanthidae =====
- Chaetodontoplus vanderloosi

===== Pomacentridae =====
- Neopomacentrus aquadulcis

===== Rhyacichthyidae =====
- Protogobius attiti

===== Sciaenidae =====
- Argyrosomus hololepidotus
- Pseudotolithus senegalensis

===== Scombridae =====
- Thunnus thynnus

===== Serranidae =====
- Hypoplectrus castroaguirrei
- Paralabrax albomaculatus

===== Sparidae =====
- Chrysoblephus gibbiceps
- Evynnis cardinalis
- Lithognathus lithognathus
- Petrus rupestris

===== Tripterygiidae =====
- Enneapterygius namarrgon

===== Xiphiidae =====
- Xiphias gladius (North Atlantic stock)

==== Pleuronectiformes ====
===== Pleuronectidae =====
- Hippoglossus hippoglossus

==== Salmoniformes ====
===== Salmonidae =====
- Coregonus pollan
- Coregonus stigmaticus
- Coregonus vandesius
- Hucho hucho
- Oncorhynchus gilae
- Oncorhynchus masou ishikawae
- Oncorhynchus nerka (FRASER RIVER, LOWER: Cultus Lk (late))
- Oncorhynchus nerka (FRASER RIVER, MIDDLE: Chilko (summer))
- Oncorhynchus nerka (FRASER RIVER, MIDDLE: Gates Ck and Channel (early summer))
- Oncorhynchus nerka (FRASER RIVER, MIDDLE: Nahatlatch (early summer))
- Oncorhynchus nerka (FRASER RIVER, MIDDLE: Stuart (early Stuart))
- Oncorhynchus nerka (FRASER RIVER, MIDDLE: Stuart (summer))
- Oncorhynchus nerka (FRASER RIVER, UPPER: Bowron (early summer))
- Oncorhynchus nerka (HECATE STRAIT-Q.C. SOUND: Queen Charlotte Sound)
- Oncorhynchus nerka (KAMCHATKA RIVER)
- Oncorhynchus nerka (NASS-SKEENA ESTUARY: Hugh Smith Lk/Boca de Quadra)
- Oncorhynchus nerka (SKEENA R, LOWER: Alastair)
- Oncorhynchus nerka (SKEENA R, UPPER)
- Salmo obtusirostris
- Salmo peristericus
- Salvelinus japonicus
- Salvelinus tolmachoffi
- Salvelinus willughbii

==== Scorpaeniformes ====
===== Scorpaenidae =====
- Scorpaena ascensionis
- Scorpaena mellissii
- Sebastolobus alascanus

===== Sebastidae =====
- Sebastes fasciatus

==== Siluriformes ====
===== Amblycipitidae =====
- Amblyceps arunchalensis
- Liobagrus kingi
- Liobagrus nigricauda

===== Amphiliidae =====
- Amphilius caudosignatus
- Amphilius korupi
- Amphilius lamani
- Paramphilius firestonei

===== Anchariidae =====
- Ancharius griseus
- Gogo ornatus

===== Ariidae =====
- Notarius bonillai

===== Austroglanididae =====
- Austroglanis barnardi

===== Bagridae =====
- Batasio sharavatiensis
- Horabagrus nigricollaris

===== Callichthyidae =====
- Lepthoplosternum tordilho

===== Clariidae =====
- Clariallabes mutsindoziensis
- Clarias magur

===== Claroteidae =====
- Chrysichthys teugelsi
- Chrysichthys walkeri
- Notoglanidium akiri
- Notoglanidium maculatum
- Notoglanidium thomasi
- Parauchenoglanis longiceps

===== Heptapteridae =====
- Imparfinis spurrellii

===== Ictaluridae =====
- Ictalurus pricei
- Noturus fasciatus
- Noturus gilberti
- Noturus lachneri
- Noturus stanauli
- Noturus taylori
- Prietella phreatophila

===== Loricariidae =====
- Ancistrus marcapatae
- Ancistrus tolima
- Ancistrus vericaucanus
- Chaetostoma changae
- Chaetostoma daidalmatos
- Chaetostoma lepturum
- Chaetostoma loborhynchos
- Chaetostoma palmeri
- Chaetostoma stroumpoulos
- Otocinclus cocama
- Panaqolus albivermis

===== Mochokidae =====
- Chiloglanis asymetricaudalis
- Synodontis dorsomaculatus
- Synodontis guttatus
- Synodontis pardalis

===== Pangasiidae =====
- Pangasianodon hypophthalmus

===== Pimelodidae =====
- Pseudoplatystoma magdaleniatum

===== Schilbeidae =====
- Irvineia voltae
- Pseudeutropius mitchelli
- Silonia childreni

===== Siluridae =====
- Pterocryptis barakensis
- Pterocryptis inusitata
- Pterocryptis wynaadensis

===== Sisoridae =====
- Glyptothorax anamalaiensis
- Glyptothorax davissinghi
- Glyptothorax housei
- Glyptothorax madraspatanus
- Glyptothorax poonaensis
- Oreoglanis heteropogon
- Oreoglanis siamensis

===== Trichomycteridae =====
- Trichomycterus taeniops
- Trichomycterus unicolor
- Trichomycterus weyrauchi

==== Synbranchiformes ====
===== Chaudhuriidae =====
- Pillaia indica

===== Mastacembelidae =====
- Mastacembelus oatesii

===== Synbranchidae =====
- Monopterus fossorius
- Ophisternon infernale

==== Syngnathiformes ====
===== Syngnathidae =====
- Hippocampus capensis
- Hippocampus whitei
- Microphis pleurostictus

==== Tetraodontiformes ====
===== Tetraodontidae =====
- Canthigaster cyanetron
- Canthigaster rapaensis
- Canthigaster sanctaehelenae
- Chelonodon pleurospilus
- Takifugu plagiocellatus

=== Amphibia ===
==== Anura ====
===== Alsodidae =====
- Alsodes barrioi
- Alsodes norae
- Alsodes valdiviensis
- Eupsophus contulmoensis
- Eupsophus migueli
- Eupsophus nahuelbutensis

===== Aromobatidae =====
- Allobates alessandroi
- Allobates ignotus
- Allobates kingsburyi
- Allobates mandelorum
- Allobates ranoides
- Anomaloglossus confusus
- Anomaloglossus kaiei
- Aromobates alboguttatus
- Aromobates duranti
- Aromobates haydeeae
- Aromobates mayorgai
- Aromobates molinarii
- Aromobates orostoma
- Aromobates saltuensis
- Aromobates serranus
- Mannophryne collaris
- Mannophryne leonardoi
- Mannophryne riveroi
- Mannophryne trujillensis
- Mannophryne yustizi

===== Arthroleptidae =====
- Arthroleptis aureoli
- Arthroleptis bioko
- Arthroleptis fichika
- Arthroleptis nlonakoensis
- Arthroleptis perreti
- Arthroleptis tanneri
- Arthroleptis xenodactylus
- Astylosternus laurenti
- Astylosternus perreti
- Astylosternus ranoides
- Astylosternus schioetzi
- Cardioglossa alsco
- Cardioglossa annulata
- Cardioglossa oreas
- Cardioglossa pulchra
- Cardioglossa venusta
- Leptodactylodon albiventris
- Leptodactylodon bueanus
- Leptodactylodon mertensi
- Leptodactylodon ornatus
- Leptodactylodon perreti
- Leptodactylodon stevarti
- Leptopelis anebos
- Leptopelis parkeri
- Leptopelis susanae
- Leptopelis vermiculatus
- Leptopelis xenodactylus

===== Batrachylidae =====
- Atelognathus patagonicus
- Atelognathus praebasalticus

===== Bombinatoridae =====
- Barbourula kalimantanensis
- Bombina pachypus

===== Brevicipitidae =====
- Callulina kisiwamsitu
- Probreviceps durirostris
- Probreviceps loveridgei
- Probreviceps macrodactylus
- Probreviceps rhodesianus
- Probreviceps rungwensis
- Probreviceps uluguruensis

===== Bufonidae =====
- Adenomus kelaartii
- Altiphrynoides malcolmi
- Anaxyrus californicus
- Anaxyrus canorus
- Anaxyrus houstonensis
- Anaxyrus nelsoni
- Ansonia latidisca
- Ansonia thinthinae
- Atelopus carrikeri
- Atelopus certus
- Atelopus dimorphus
- Atelopus epikeisthos
- Atelopus exiguus
- Atelopus laetissimus
- Atelopus limosus
- Atelopus longibrachius
- Atelopus lozanoi
- Atelopus marinkellei
- Atelopus mittermeieri
- Atelopus muisca
- Atelopus nahumae
- Atelopus nepiozomus
- Atelopus oxapampae
- Atelopus seminiferus
- Bufoides meghalayanus
- Dendrophryniscus carvalhoi
- Duttaphrynus beddomii
- Duttaphrynus kotagamai
- Duttaphrynus noellerti
- Ghatophryne ornata
- Incilius cavifrons
- Incilius gemmifer
- Incilius ibarrai
- Incilius leucomyos
- Incilius perplexus
- Incilius spiculatus
- Incilius tacanensis
- Incilius tutelarius
- Ingerophrynus kumquat
- Melanophryniscus devincenzii
- Mertensophryne anotis
- Mertensophryne howelli
- Nannophryne corynetes
- Nectophrynoides cryptus
- Nectophrynoides minutus
- Nectophrynoides vestergaardi
- Osornophryne antisana
- Osornophryne guacamayo
- Osornophryne puruanta
- Parapelophryne scalpta
- Pedostibes tuberculosus
- Pelophryne api
- Peltophryne cataulaciceps
- Peltophryne fracta
- Peltophryne longinasus
- Rhaebo caeruleostictus
- Rhaebo colomai
- Rhinella arborescandens
- Rhinella chavin
- Rhinella chrysophora
- Rhinella gallardoi
- Rhinella lindae
- Rhinella nesiotes
- Rhinella nicefori
- Rhinella sclerocephala
- Rhinella tenrec
- Rhinella vellardi
- Rhinella yanachaga
- Rhinella yunga
- Sclerophrys djohongensis
- Sclerophrys pantherina
- Sclerophrys taiensis
- Sclerophrys villiersi
- Truebella tothastes
- Werneria mertensiana
- Werneria preussi
- Werneria submontana
- Wolterstorffina mirei
- Xanthophryne koynayensis

===== Calyptocephalellidae =====
- Telmatobufo bullocki
- Telmatobufo ignotus
- Telmatobufo venustus

===== Centrolenidae =====
- Centrolene azulae
- Centrolene lynchi
- Centrolene petrophilum
- Centrolene pipilatum
- Cochranella mache
- Cochranella megistra
- Hyalinobatrachium esmeralda
- Hyalinobatrachium guairarepanense
- Hyalinobatrachium pallidum
- Nymphargus luminosus
- Nymphargus megacheirus
- Rulyrana saxiscandens

===== Ceratobatrachidae =====
- Alcalus mariae
- Cornufer vitianus
- Platymantis diesmosi
- Platymantis lawtoni
- Platymantis levigatus
- Platymantis negrosensis
- Platymantis paengi
- Platymantis panayensis
- Platymantis spelaeus
- Platymantis subterrestris

===== Conrauidae =====
- Conraua goliath

===== Craugastoridae =====
- Bryophryne cophites
- Craugastor aurilegulus
- Craugastor azueroensis
- Craugastor charadra
- Craugastor daryi
- Craugastor hobartsmithi
- Craugastor inachus
- Craugastor laevissimus
- Craugastor lauraster
- Craugastor montanus
- Craugastor omiltemanus
- Craugastor pechorum
- Craugastor punctariolus
- Craugastor rhyacobatrachus
- Craugastor sandersoni
- Craugastor silvicola
- Craugastor spatulatus
- Craugastor stuarti
- Craugastor uno
- Craugastor vulcani
- Geobatrachus walkeri
- Hypodactylus araiodactylus
- Hypodactylus brunneus
- Hypodactylus elassodiscus
- Hypodactylus lucida
- Lynchius nebulanastes
- Lynchius parkeri
- Niceforonia adenobrachia
- Noblella lynchi
- Oreobates ayacucho
- Oreobates lehri
- Oreobates lundbergi
- Oreobates pereger
- Phrynopus barthlenae
- Phrynopus daemon
- Phrynopus dagmarae
- Phrynopus horstpauli
- Phrynopus inti
- Phrynopus kauneorum
- Phrynopus montium
- Phrynopus vestigiatus
- Pristimantis acerus
- Pristimantis actinolaimus
- Pristimantis acutirostris
- Pristimantis affinis
- Pristimantis alalocophus
- Pristimantis angustilineatus
- Pristimantis ardalonychus
- Pristimantis atratus
- Pristimantis aureoventris
- Pristimantis bacchus
- Pristimantis balionotus
- Pristimantis baryecuus
- Pristimantis bellona
- Pristimantis bounides
- Pristimantis cacao
- Pristimantis capitonis
- Pristimantis carmelitae
- Pristimantis chrysops
- Pristimantis cordovae
- Pristimantis cremnobates
- Pristimantis crenunguis
- Pristimantis cristinae
- Pristimantis cryophilius
- Pristimantis cryptomelas
- Pristimantis degener
- Pristimantis deinops
- Pristimantis delicatus
- Pristimantis devillei
- Pristimantis dissimulatus
- Pristimantis eugeniae
- Pristimantis euphronides
- Pristimantis fasciatus
- Pristimantis festae
- Pristimantis gentryi
- Pristimantis ginesi
- Pristimantis gladiator
- Pristimantis glandulosus
- Pristimantis helvolus
- Pristimantis hernandezi
- Pristimantis hybotragus
- Pristimantis ignicolor
- Pristimantis incanus
- Pristimantis jorgevelosai
- Pristimantis lancinii
- Pristimantis lasalleorum
- Pristimantis lividus
- Pristimantis loustes
- Pristimantis mnionaetes
- Pristimantis modipeplus
- Pristimantis museosus
- Pristimantis mutabilis
- Pristimantis ocreatus
- Pristimantis orestes
- Pristimantis ornatus
- Pristimantis paramerus
- Pristimantis pardalinus
- Pristimantis parectatus
- Pristimantis pastazensis
- Pristimantis percultus
- Pristimantis petrobardus
- Pristimantis phalarus
- Pristimantis pinguis
- Pristimantis prolatus
- Pristimantis proserpens
- Pristimantis pteridophilus
- Pristimantis pulchridormientes
- Pristimantis pycnodermis
- Pristimantis pyrrhomerus
- Pristimantis quantus
- Pristimantis renjiforum
- Pristimantis rhodoplichus
- Pristimantis rivasi
- Pristimantis rubicundus
- Pristimantis ruthveni
- Pristimantis satagius
- Pristimantis scoloblepharus
- Pristimantis serendipitus
- Pristimantis shrevei
- Pristimantis simonbolivari
- Pristimantis simoteriscus
- Pristimantis siopelus
- Pristimantis sobetes
- Pristimantis sulculus
- Pristimantis surdus
- Pristimantis tenebrionis
- Pristimantis thymalopsoides
- Pristimantis truebae
- Pristimantis turumiquirensis
- Pristimantis urichi
- Pristimantis vidua
- Pristimantis viridicans
- Pristimantis viridis
- Pristimantis wagteri
- Psychrophrynella boettgeri
- Strabomantis ruizi
- Yunganastes bisignatus

===== Cycloramphidae =====
- Insuetophrynus acarpicus
- Rhinoderma darwinii
- Thoropa lutzi

===== Dendrobatidae =====
- Ameerega cainarachi
- Ameerega rubriventris
- Ameerega shihuemoy
- Ameerega silverstonei
- Ameerega yoshina
- Andinobates daleswansoni
- Colostethus agilis
- Colostethus ucumari
- Epipedobates tricolor
- Excidobates mysteriosus
- Hyloxalus azureiventris
- Hyloxalus cevallosi
- Hyloxalus elachyhistus
- Hyloxalus sylvaticus
- Hyloxalus toachi
- Oophaga arborea
- Oophaga speciosa
- Phyllobates bicolor
- Phyllobates terribilis
- Phyllobates vittatus
- Ranitomeya summersi
- Silverstoneia dalyi
- Silverstoneia punctiventris

===== Dicroglossidae =====
- Fejervarya greenii
- Fejervarya nicobariensis
- Fejervarya nilagirica
- Limnonectes arathooni
- Limnonectes ferneri
- Limnonectes microtympanum
- Limnonectes namiyei
- Limnonectes nitidus
- Minervarya sahyadris
- Nannophrys naeyakai
- Nanorana maculosa
- Nanorana unculuanus
- Nanorana yunnanensis
- Quasipaa boulengeri
- Quasipaa robertingeri

===== Eleutherodactylidae =====
- Adelophryne maranguapensis
- Eleutherodactylus acmonis
- Eleutherodactylus adelus
- Eleutherodactylus alcoae
- Eleutherodactylus amplinympha
- Eleutherodactylus andrewsi
- Eleutherodactylus armstrongi
- Eleutherodactylus auriculatoides
- Eleutherodactylus barlagnei
- Eleutherodactylus casparii
- Eleutherodactylus counouspeus
- Eleutherodactylus dennisi
- Eleutherodactylus dilatus
- Eleutherodactylus diplasius
- Eleutherodactylus emiliae
- Eleutherodactylus etheridgei
- Eleutherodactylus glamyrus
- Eleutherodactylus glaphycompus
- Eleutherodactylus grabhami
- Eleutherodactylus grahami
- Eleutherodactylus greyi
- Eleutherodactylus gryllus
- Eleutherodactylus guanahacabibes
- Eleutherodactylus gundlachi
- Eleutherodactylus haitianus
- Eleutherodactylus hedricki
- Eleutherodactylus heminota
- Eleutherodactylus hypostenor
- Eleutherodactylus intermedius
- Eleutherodactylus ionthus
- Eleutherodactylus jamaicensis
- Eleutherodactylus klinikowskii
- Eleutherodactylus leberi
- Eleutherodactylus lentus
- Eleutherodactylus luteolus
- Eleutherodactylus melacara
- Eleutherodactylus michaelschmidi
- Eleutherodactylus minutus
- Eleutherodactylus montanus
- Eleutherodactylus notidodes
- Eleutherodactylus nubicola
- Eleutherodactylus patriciae
- Eleutherodactylus pinarensis
- Eleutherodactylus pinchoni
- Eleutherodactylus pituinus
- Eleutherodactylus portoricensis
- Eleutherodactylus principalis
- Eleutherodactylus probolaeus
- Eleutherodactylus ruthae
- Eleutherodactylus saxatilis
- Eleutherodactylus schwartzi
- Eleutherodactylus simulans
- Eleutherodactylus sommeri
- Eleutherodactylus syristes
- Eleutherodactylus thomasi
- Eleutherodactylus toa
- Eleutherodactylus wightmanae
- Eleutherodactylus zeus
- Eleutherodactylus zugi

===== Heleophrynidae =====
- Heleophryne hewitti

===== Hemiphractidae =====
- Cryptobatrachus pedroruizi
- Cryptobatrachus ruthveni
- Flectonotus fitzgeraldi
- Gastrotheca aureomaculata
- Gastrotheca christiani
- Gastrotheca cornuta
- Gastrotheca espeletia
- Gastrotheca litonedis
- Gastrotheca nebulanastes
- Gastrotheca ochoai
- Gastrotheca orophylax
- Gastrotheca ovifera
- Gastrotheca pacchamama
- Gastrotheca pseustes
- Gastrotheca psychrophila
- Gastrotheca rebeccae
- Gastrotheca riobambae
- Gastrotheca splendens
- Gastrotheca stictopleura
- Gastrotheca trachyceps
- Hemiphractus johnsoni

===== Hylidae =====
- Agalychnis annae
- Argenteohyla siemersi
- Callimedusa baltea
- Callimedusa ecuatoriana
- Charadrahyla chaneque
- Dendropsophus gryllatus
- Dendropsophus meridensis
- Dryophytes suweonensis
- Duellmanohyla chamulae
- Duellmanohyla ignicolor
- Duellmanohyla lythrodes
- Duellmanohyla soralia
- Duellmanohyla uranochroa
- Ecnomiohyla fimbrimembra
- Ecnomiohyla minera
- Exerodonta catracha
- Exerodonta chimalapa
- Hyloscirtus charazani
- Hyloscirtus denticulentus
- Hyloscirtus piceigularis
- Hyloscirtus psarolaimus
- Hyloscirtus staufferorum
- Hyloscirtus tigrinus
- Isthmohyla pictipes
- Litoria brevipalmata
- Litoria cooloolensis
- Litoria dayi
- Litoria nannotis
- Litoria raniformis
- Litoria rheocola
- Megastomatohyla mixomaculata
- Megastomatohyla nubicola
- Osteopilus crucialis
- Osteopilus marianae
- Osteopilus wilderi
- Plectrohyla arborescandens
- Plectrohyla charadricola
- Plectrohyla cyclada
- Plectrohyla glandulosa
- Plectrohyla lacertosa
- Plectrohyla mykter
- Plectrohyla pentheter
- Plectrohyla psiloderma
- Plectrohyla robertsorum
- Plectrohyla sagorum
- Ptychohyla erythromma
- Ptychohyla legleri
- Ptychohyla leonhardschultzei
- Ptychohyla panchoi
- Ptychohyla salvadorensis
- Ptychohyla spinipollex
- Scinax belloni
- Scinax skuki
- Smilisca dentata

===== Hyperoliidae =====
- Afrixalus clarkei
- Afrixalus dorsimaculatus
- Afrixalus knysnae
- Afrixalus lacteus
- Arlequinus krebsi
- Chrysobatrachus cupreonitens
- Hyperolius ademetzi
- Hyperolius bobirensis
- Hyperolius dintelmanni
- Hyperolius kihangensis
- Hyperolius leleupi
- Hyperolius leucotaenius
- Hyperolius nienokouensis
- Hyperolius nimbae
- Hyperolius pickersgilli
- Hyperolius puncticulatus
- Hyperolius rubrovermiculatus
- Hyperolius thomensis
- Hyperolius torrentis
- Hyperolius ukwiva
- Kassina jozani
- Phlyctimantis keithae

===== Leptodactylidae =====
- Adenomera lutzi
- Physalaemus soaresi

===== Limnodynastidae =====
- Philoria kundagungan
- Philoria loveridgei
- Philoria pughi
- Philoria richmondensis
- Philoria sphagnicolus

===== Mantellidae =====
- Aglyptodactylus australis
- Boophis andrangoloaka
- Boophis anjanaharibeensis
- Boophis arcanus
- Boophis boehmei
- Boophis boppa
- Boophis feonnyala
- Boophis haematopus
- Boophis haingana
- Boophis jaegeri
- Boophis laurenti
- Boophis miadana
- Boophis narinsi
- Boophis piperatus
- Boophis rhodoscelis
- Boophis sambirano
- Boophis sandrae
- Boophis schuboeae
- Boophis solomaso
- Gephyromantis atsingy
- Gephyromantis azzurrae
- Gephyromantis corvus
- Gephyromantis eiselti
- Gephyromantis hintelmannae
- Gephyromantis klemmeri
- Gephyromantis ranjomavo
- Gephyromantis thelenae
- Gephyromantis webbi
- Gephyromantis zavona
- Guibemantis annulatus
- Guibemantis wattersoni
- Mantella cowanii
- Mantella expectata
- Mantella haraldmeieri
- Mantella viridis
- Mantidactylus albofrenatus
- Mantidactylus bourgati
- Mantidactylus delormei
- Mantidactylus madecassus
- Mantidactylus paidroa
- Spinomantis brunae
- Spinomantis microtis
- Tsingymantis antitra

===== Megophryidae =====
- Leptobrachium boringii
- Leptobrachium echinatum
- Leptobrachium leishanense
- Leptobrachium ngoclinhense
- Leptobrachium rakhinensis
- Leptobrachium xanthops
- Leptolalax alpinus
- Leptolalax applebyi
- Leptolalax bidoupensis
- Leptolalax firthi
- Leptolalax melicus
- Leptolalax pluvialis
- Leptolalax solus
- Megophrys brachykolos
- Oreolalax chuanbeiensis
- Oreolalax omeimontis
- Oreolalax pingii
- Oreolalax puxiongensis
- Scutiger chintingensis
- Scutiger muliensis
- Scutiger ningshanensis
- Scutiger pingwuensis

===== Micrixalidae =====
- Micrixalus gadgili

===== Microhylidae =====
- Anodonthyla emilei
- Anodonthyla hutchisoni
- Anodonthyla jeanbai
- Anodonthyla moramora
- Anodonthyla nigrigularis
- Anodonthyla rouxae
- Callulops kopsteini
- Chiasmocleis lacrimae
- Cophixalus mcdonaldi
- Cophixalus monticola
- Cophixalus neglectus
- Cophyla alticola
- Cophyla berara
- Cophyla mavomavo
- Cophyla milloti
- Cophyla noromalalae
- Cophyla olgae
- Cophyla rava
- Cophyla tetra
- Cophyla tsaratananaensis
- Ctenophryne barbatula
- Ctenophryne carpish
- Hoplophryne rogersi
- Hoplophryne uluguruensis
- Kalophrynus cryptophonus
- Kalophrynus palmatissimus
- Madecassophryne truebae
- Melanobatrachus indicus
- Microhyla pulchella
- Microhyla sholigari
- Microhyla zeylanica
- Micryletta steinegeri
- Oreophryne monticola
- Plethodontohyla fonetana
- Plethodontohyla guentheri
- Rhombophryne be
- Rhombophryne botabota
- Rhombophryne guentherpetersi
- Rhombophryne kibomena
- Rhombophryne longicrus
- Rhombophryne madagascariensis
- Rhombophryne miery
- Rhombophryne minuta
- Rhombophryne ornata
- Rhombophryne psologlossa
- Rhombophryne pygmaea
- Rhombophryne roseifemoralis
- Rhombophryne savaka
- Rhombophryne serratopalpebrosa
- Rhombophryne tany
- Rhombophryne testudo
- Rhombophryne vaventy
- Scaphiophryne gottlebei
- Uperodon mormorata
- Uperodon palmatus

===== Myobatrachidae =====
- Mixophyes fleayi
- Mixophyes iteratus
- Pseudophryne covacevichae
- Pseudophryne pengilleyi

===== Nasikabatrachidae =====
- Nasikabatrachus sahyadrensis

===== Nyctibatrachidae =====
- Nyctibatrachus aliciae
- Nyctibatrachus beddomii
- Nyctibatrachus karnatakaensis
- Nyctibatrachus minor
- Nyctibatrachus sanctipalustris
- Nyctibatrachus vasanthi

===== Pelobatidae =====
- Pelobates varaldii

===== Petropedetidae =====
- Arthroleptides martiensseni
- Arthroleptides yakusini
- Petropedetes palmipes
- Petropedetes perreti

===== Phrynobatrachidae =====
- Phrynobatrachus annulatus
- Phrynobatrachus ghanensis
- Phrynobatrachus irangi
- Phrynobatrachus krefftii
- Phrynobatrachus pakenhami
- Phrynobatrachus pintoi
- Phrynobatrachus ungujae

===== Pipidae =====
- Pipa myersi
- Xenopus gilli
- Xenopus itombwensis
- Xenopus largeni

===== Ptychadenidae =====
- Ptychadena nana
- Ptychadena newtoni

===== Pyxicephalidae =====
- Amietia inyangae
- Amietia johnstoni
- Anhydrophryne ngongoniensis
- Cacosternum thorini
- Natalobatrachus bonebergi
- Nothophryne broadleyi

===== Ranidae =====
- Amnirana asperrima
- Amnirana occidentalis
- Amolops cucae
- Amolops hainanensis
- Amolops hongkongensis
- Amolops minutus
- Babina holsti
- Babina okinavana
- Babina subaspera
- Hylarana montivaga
- Lithobates dunni
- Lithobates johni
- Lithobates onca
- Odorrana amamiensis
- Odorrana ishikawae
- Odorrana kuangwuensis
- Odorrana narina
- Odorrana splendida
- Odorrana supranarina
- Odorrana utsunomiyaorum
- Odorrana yentuensis
- Pelophylax cretensis
- Pelophylax shqipericus
- Pelophylax tenggerensis
- Pulchrana mangyanum
- Rana muscosa
- Rana pyrenaica
- Rana sauteri
- Rana sierrae
- Rana tavasensis

===== Ranixalidae =====
- Indirana brachytarsus
- Indirana diplosticta
- Indirana leptodactyla

===== Rhacophoridae =====
- Chiromantis nauli
- Chiromantis trilaksonoi
- Ghatixalus variabilis
- Gracixalus lumarius
- Gracixalus quyeti
- Liuixalus ocellatus
- Liuixalus romeri
- Philautus aurantium
- Philautus cardamonus
- Philautus disgregus
- Philautus kerangae
- Philautus neelanethrus
- Philautus schmackeri
- Polypedates insularis
- Pseudophilautus alto
- Pseudophilautus asankai
- Pseudophilautus auratus
- Pseudophilautus caeruleus
- Pseudophilautus cavirostris
- Pseudophilautus cuspis
- Pseudophilautus femoralis
- Pseudophilautus folicola
- Pseudophilautus frankenbergi
- Pseudophilautus fulvus
- Pseudophilautus microtympanum
- Pseudophilautus mittermeieri
- Pseudophilautus mooreorum
- Pseudophilautus pleurotaenia
- Pseudophilautus poppiae
- Pseudophilautus reticulatus
- Pseudophilautus sarasinorum
- Pseudophilautus schmarda
- Pseudophilautus silus
- Pseudophilautus silvaticus
- Pseudophilautus singu
- Pseudophilautus steineri
- Pseudophilautus stuarti
- Pseudophilautus tanu
- Pseudophilautus wynaadensis
- Pseudophilautus zorro
- Raorchestes charius
- Raorchestes nerostagona
- Raorchestes signatus
- Raorchestes tinniens
- Raorchestes travancoricus
- Raorchestes viridis
- Rhacophorus angulirostris
- Rhacophorus arvalis
- Rhacophorus aurantiventris
- Rhacophorus calcadensis
- Rhacophorus calcaneus
- Rhacophorus helenae
- Rhacophorus lateralis
- Rhacophorus minimus
- Rhacophorus vampyrus
- Rhacophorus yaoshanensis
- Taruga eques
- Taruga longinasus
- Theloderma bicolor
- Theloderma nebulosum
- Theloderma palliatum
- Theloderma ryabovi

===== Sooglossidae =====
- Sechellophryne gardineri
- Sooglossus sechellensis

===== Telmatobiidae =====
- Telmatobius brachydactylus
- Telmatobius brevirostris
- Telmatobius ceiorum
- Telmatobius edaphonastes
- Telmatobius hypselocephalus
- Telmatobius ignavus
- Telmatobius laticeps
- Telmatobius latirostris
- Telmatobius macrostomus
- Telmatobius mayoloi
- Telmatobius pisanoi
- Telmatobius platycephalus
- Telmatobius punctatus
- Telmatobius schreiteri
- Telmatobius scrocchii
- Telmatobius sibiricus
- Telmatobius stephani
- Telmatobius zapahuirensis

==== Caudata ====
===== Ambystomatidae =====
- Ambystoma altamirani
- Ambystoma flavipiperatum
- Ambystoma lermaense
- Ambystoma ordinarium

===== Hynobiidae =====
- Batrachuperus londongensis
- Hynobius chinensis
- Hynobius dunni
- Hynobius formosanus
- Hynobius hidamontanus
- Hynobius sonani
- Hynobius takedai
- Hynobius yangi
- Pachyhynobius yunanicus
- Ranodon sibiricus

===== Plethodontidae =====
- Batrachoseps campi
- Bolitoglossa alvaradoi
- Bolitoglossa celaque
- Bolitoglossa compacta
- Bolitoglossa conanti
- Bolitoglossa dunni
- Bolitoglossa engelhardti
- Bolitoglossa flavimembris
- Bolitoglossa flaviventris
- Bolitoglossa franklini
- Bolitoglossa heiroreias
- Bolitoglossa magnifica
- Bolitoglossa marmorea
- Bolitoglossa meliana
- Bolitoglossa minutula
- Bolitoglossa nigrescens
- Bolitoglossa pandi
- Bolitoglossa porrasorum
- Bolitoglossa riletti
- Bolitoglossa salvinii
- Bolitoglossa sooyorum
- Bolitoglossa subpalmata
- Bolitoglossa tatamae
- Bolitoglossa tica
- Bolitoglossa veracrucis
- Chiropterotriton chondrostega
- Chiropterotriton cracens
- Chiropterotriton dimidiatus
- Chiropterotriton multidentatus
- Cryptotriton alvarezdeltoroi
- Cryptotriton nasalis
- Dendrotriton kekchiorum
- Eurycea naufragia
- Eurycea tonkawae
- Gyrinophilus gulolineatus
- Gyrinophilus subterraneus
- Isthmura boneti
- Isthmura maxima
- Ixalotriton niger
- Nototriton barbouri
- Nototriton brodiei
- Nototriton limnospectator
- Nyctanolis pernix
- Oedipina carablanca
- Oedipina gephyra
- Oedipina gracilis
- Oedipina grandis
- Oedipina poelzi
- Oedipina pseudouniformis
- Oedipina stenopodia
- Phaeognathus hubrichti
- Plethodon stormi
- Plethodon welleri
- Pseudoeurycea altamontana
- Pseudoeurycea conanti
- Pseudoeurycea firscheini
- Pseudoeurycea lineola
- Pseudoeurycea longicauda
- Pseudoeurycea lynchi
- Pseudoeurycea melanomolga
- Pseudoeurycea nigromaculata
- Pseudoeurycea orchimelas
- Pseudoeurycea papenfussi
- Pseudoeurycea ruficauda
- Pseudoeurycea tenchalli
- Pseudoeurycea teotepec
- Pseudoeurycea tlilicxitl
- Pseudoeurycea werleri
- Speleomantes supramontis
- Thorius adelos
- Thorius arboreus
- Thorius boreas
- Thorius dubitus
- Thorius grandis
- Thorius lunaris
- Thorius minydemus
- Thorius omiltemi
- Thorius papaloae
- Thorius pulmonaris
- Thorius schmidti
- Thorius troglodytes

===== Proteidae =====
- Necturus alabamensis

===== Salamandridae =====
- Cynops ensicauda
- Echinotriton andersoni
- Euproctus platycephalus
- Hypselotriton orphicus
- Laotriton laoensis
- Lyciasalamandra antalyana
- Lyciasalamandra atifi
- Lyciasalamandra fazilae
- Lyciasalamandra flavimembris
- Notophthalmus meridionalis
- Paramesotriton guangxiensis
- Pleurodeles poireti
- Tylototriton hainanensis
- Tylototriton vietnamensis

==== Gymnophiona ====
===== Herpelidae =====
- Boulengerula changamwensis
- Boulengerula niedeni
- Boulengerula taitana

===== Ichthyophiidae =====
- Ichthyophis weberi

===== Indotyphlidae =====
- Hypogeophis brevis
- Praslinia cooperi

===== Rhinatrematidae =====
- Rhinatrema shiv

===== Scolecomorphidae =====
- Scolecomorphus uluguruensis

=== Aves ===
==== Accipitriformes ====
===== Accipitridae =====
- Accipiter gundlachi
- Aquila nipalensis
- Buteogallus coronatus
- Circus macrosceles
- Circus maillardi
- Circus maurus
- Eutriorchis astur
- Gyps coprotheres
- Haliaeetus leucoryphus
- Leptodon forbesi
- Neophron percnopterus
- Nisaetus bartelsi
- Nisaetus philippensis
- Nisaetus pinskeri
- Pseudastur occidentalis
- Spizaetus isidori
- Torgos tracheliotos

==== Anseriformes ====
===== Anatidae =====
- Anas bernieri
- Anas melleri
- Anas nesiotis
- Anas wyvilliana
- Asarcornis scutulata
- Hymenolaimus malacorhynchos
- Mergus squamatus
- Oxyura leucocephala

==== Bucerotiformes ====
===== Bucerotidae =====
- Penelopides mindorensis
- Penelopides panini
- Rhyticeros narcondami

==== Caprimulgiformes ====
===== Apodidae =====
- Aerodramus bartschi

===== Caprimulgidae =====
- Antrostomus noctitherus
- Caprimulgus prigoginei
- Eleothreptus candicans

===== Trochilidae =====
- Aglaeactis aliciae
- Aglaiocercus berlepschi
- Amazilia boucardi
- Amazilia castaneiventris
- Amazilia luciae
- Campylopterus phainopeplus
- Chaetocercus berlepschi
- Eriocnemis mirabilis
- Eupherusa cyanophrys
- Glaucis dohrnii
- Heliangelus regalis
- Hylonympha macrocerca
- Loddigesia mirabilis
- Metallura baroni
- Metallura iracunda
- Ramphomicron dorsale
- Selasphorus ardens
- Taphrolesbia griseiventris
- Thalurania watertonii

==== Charadriiformes ====
===== Alcidae =====
- Brachyramphus marmoratus
- Synthliboramphus hypoleucus

===== Charadriidae =====
- Thinornis novaeseelandiae

===== Haematopodidae =====
- Haematopus chathamensis

===== Laridae =====
- Chlidonias albostriatus
- Larus bulleri
- Sterna acuticauda
- Sternula lorata

===== Rostratulidae =====
- Rostratula australis

===== Scolopacidae =====
- Calidris tenuirostris
- Numenius madagascariensis
- Prosobonia parvirostris
- Scolopax rochussenii
- Tringa guttifer

===== Turnicidae =====
- Turnix hottentottus
- Turnix olivii

==== Ciconiiformes ====
===== Ciconiidae =====
- Ciconia boyciana
- Ciconia stormi
- Leptoptilos dubius
- Mycteria cinerea

==== Columbiformes ====
===== Columbidae =====
- Alopecoenas hoedtii
- Alopecoenas rubescens
- Alopecoenas sanctaecrucis
- Columba thomensis
- Ducula aurorae
- Ducula galeata
- Ducula mindorensis
- Geotrygon leucometopia
- Geotrygon purpurata
- Leptotila conoveri
- Nesoenas mayeri
- Otidiphaps insularis
- Phapitreron cinereiceps
- Ptilinopus huttoni
- Ptilinopus roseicapilla
- Starnoenas cyanocephala
- Treron griveaudi
- Treron psittaceus
- Zentrygon carrikeri

==== Coraciiformes ====
===== Alcedinidae =====
- Actenoides bougainvillei
- Actenoides excelsus

==== Cuculiformes ====
===== Cuculidae =====
- Coccyzus rufigularis
- Neomorphus radiolosus

==== Eurypygiformes ====
===== Rhynochetidae =====
- Rhynochetos jubatus

==== Falconiformes ====
===== Falconidae =====
- Falco cherrug
- Falco punctatus

==== Galliformes ====
===== Cracidae =====
- Crax blumenbachii
- Crax globulosa
- Oreophasis derbianus
- Pauxi pauxi
- Penelope ortoni
- Penelope perspicax
- Pipile jacutinga

===== Megapodiidae =====
- Aepypodius bruijnii
- Macrocephalon maleo
- Megapodius laperouse
- Megapodius pritchardii

===== Odontophoridae =====
- Odontophorus strophium

===== Phasianidae =====
- Arborophila rufipectus
- Centrocercus minimus
- Pavo muticus
- Perdicula manipurensis
- Polyplectron katsumatae
- Polyplectron schleiermacheri
- Pternistis camerunensis
- Pternistis swierstrai
- Xenoperdix udzungwensis

==== Gruiformes ====
===== Gruidae =====
- Balearica regulorum
- Grus americana
- Grus japonensis

===== Heliornithidae =====
- Heliopais personatus

===== Psophiidae =====
- Psophia dextralis

===== Rallidae =====
- Gymnocrex talaudensis
- Hypotaenidia okinawae
- Hypotaenidia sylvestris
- Laterallus levraudi
- Laterallus tuerosi
- Porphyrio hochstetteri
- Rallus semiplumbeus
- Rallus wetmorei
- Sarothrura watersi
- Zapornia olivieri

==== Musophagiformes ====
===== Musophagidae =====
- Tauraco bannermani

==== Otidiformes ====
===== Otididae =====
- Neotis ludwigii
- Sypheotides indicus

==== Passeriformes ====
===== Acanthisittidae =====
- Xenicus gilviventris

===== Acrocephalidae =====
- Acrocephalus aequinoctialis
- Acrocephalus caffer
- Acrocephalus griseldis
- Acrocephalus sorghophilus
- Acrocephalus vaughani

===== Alaudidae =====
- Heteromirafra ruddi
- Mirafra ashi
- Mirafra sharpii
- Spizocorys fringillaris

===== Atrichornithidae =====
- Atrichornis clamosus
- Atrichornis rufescens

===== Campephagidae =====
- Edolisoma insperatum
- Edolisoma nesiotis

===== Cardinalidae =====
- Habia atrimaxillaris

===== Cisticolidae =====
- Apalis flavigularis
- Artisornis sousae
- Eremomela turneri
- Schistolais leontica

===== Corvidae =====
- Corvus florensis
- Pica asirensis
- Urocissa whiteheadi
- Zavattariornis stresemanni

===== Cotingidae =====
- Carpodectes antoniae
- Cephalopterus glabricollis
- Cotinga maculata
- Phibalura boliviana
- Phytotoma raimondii

===== Dasyornithidae =====
- Dasyornis brachypterus
- Dasyornis longirostris

===== Dicruridae =====
- Dicrurus fuscipennis
- Dicrurus menagei

===== Emberizidae =====
- Emberiza jankowskii

===== Estrildidae =====
- Cryptospiza shelleyi

===== Fringillidae =====
- Crithagra flavigula
- Fringilla polatzeki
- Hemignathus wilsoni
- Linaria johannis
- Loxia megaplaga
- Loxops coccineus
- Manucerthia mana
- Paroreomyza montana
- Spinus cucullatus

===== Furnariidae =====
- Asthenes perijana
- Automolus lammi
- Cranioleuca henricae
- Cranioleuca muelleri
- Leptasthenura xenothorax
- Premnoplex pariae
- Premnoplex tatei
- Synallaxis infuscata
- Synallaxis zimmeri
- Thripophaga amacurensis

===== Grallariidae =====
- Grallaria kaestneri
- Grallaria ridgelyi
- Grallaria saltuensis
- Grallaricula ochraceifrons

===== Hirundinidae =====
- Progne modesta
- Tachycineta cyaneoviridis

===== Hyliotidae =====
- Hyliota usambara

===== Hylocitreidae =====
- Hylocitrea bonthaina

===== Icteridae =====
- Agelaius tricolor
- Agelaius xanthomus
- Anumara forbesi
- Cacicus koepckeae
- Macroagelaius subalaris
- Nesopsar nigerrimus
- Psarocolius cassini

===== Leiothrichidae =====
- Garrulax bicolor
- Laniellus langbianis
- Leiothrix laurinae
- Trochalopteron cachinnans
- Trochalopteron jerdoni
- Trochalopteron yersini

===== Locustellidae =====
- Bradypterus graueri
- Megalurulus rufus

===== Macrosphenidae =====
- Macrosphenus pulitzeri

===== Malaconotidae =====
- Chlorophoneus kupeensis
- Laniarius amboimensis
- Laniarius brauni
- Malaconotus alius

===== Maluridae =====
- Stipiturus mallee

===== Meliphagidae =====
- Gymnomyza samoensis
- Manorina melanotis

===== Mimidae =====
- Mimus melanotis
- Mimus trifasciatus
- Ramphocinclus brachyurus

===== Mohouidae =====
- Mohoua ochrocephala

===== Monarchidae =====
- Chasiempis ibidis
- Clytorhynchus sanctaecrucis
- Metabolus rugensis
- Pomarea mendozae
- Symposiachrus brehmii
- Symposiachrus everetti
- Symposiachrus sacerdotum

===== Motacillidae =====
- Anthus sokokensis
- Macronyx sharpei
- Madanga ruficollis

===== Muscicapidae =====
- Chamaetylas choloensis
- Copsychus sechellarum
- Cyornis sanfordi
- Ficedula bonthaina
- Humblotia flavirostris
- Kittacincla cebuensis
- Larvivora ruficeps
- Monticola erythronotus
- Myiomela albiventris
- Myiomela major
- Myophonus blighi
- Sheppardia aurantiithorax
- Sheppardia gabela
- Sheppardia montana
- Vauriella albigularis

===== Nectariniidae =====
- Aethopyga duyvenbodei
- Cinnyris loveridgei
- Hedydipna pallidigaster

===== Oriolidae =====
- Oriolus mellianus

===== Pardalotidae =====
- Pardalotus quadragintus

===== Paridae =====
- Sittiparus owstoni

===== Parulidae =====
- Basileuterus griseiceps
- Catharopeza bishopi
- Geothlypis speciosa
- Myioborus pariae
- Setophaga angelae
- Setophaga chrysoparia

===== Passerellidae =====
- Ammospiza caudacuta
- Atlapetes flaviceps
- Atlapetes melanopsis
- Atlapetes pallidiceps
- Junco insularis
- Pipilo socorroensis
- Spizella wortheni
- Torreornis inexpectata
- Xenospiza baileyi

===== Pellorneidae =====
- Laticilla cinerascens
- Rimator pasquieri

===== Petroicidae =====
- Petroica multicolor
- Petroica traversi

===== Pittidae =====
- Erythropitta caeruleitorques
- Erythropitta palliceps
- Hydrornis gurneyi
- Pitta superba

===== Platysteiridae =====
- Platysteira laticincta

===== Ploceidae =====
- Foudia rubra
- Malimbus ballmanni
- Malimbus ibadanensis
- Ploceus aureonucha
- Ploceus batesi
- Ploceus golandi
- Ploceus nicolli

===== Pycnonotidae =====
- Chlorocichla prigoginei
- Hypsipetes moheliensis
- Hypsipetes siquijorensis
- Pycnonotus zeylanicus

===== Rhinocryptidae =====
- Eleoscytalopus psychopompus
- Scytalopus canus
- Scytalopus diamantinensis
- Scytalopus gonzagai
- Scytalopus iraiensis
- Scytalopus robbinsi
- Scytalopus rodriguezi

===== Sittidae =====
- Sitta insularis
- Sitta ledanti
- Sitta magna
- Sitta victoriae

===== Sturnidae =====
- Aplonis santovestris
- Gracula venerata

===== Thamnophilidae =====
- Clytoctantes alixii
- Euchrepomis sharpei
- Formicivora acutirostris
- Formicivora erythronotos
- Formicivora grantsaui
- Herpsilochmus parkeri
- Myrmoderus ruficauda
- Pyriglena atra
- Rhopornis ardesiacus

===== Thraupidae =====
- Bangsia aureocincta
- Cnemathraupis aureodorsalis
- Conothraupis mesoleuca
- Diglossa gloriosissima
- Diglossa venezuelensis
- Dubusia carrikeri
- Gubernatrix cristata
- Melanospiza richardsoni
- Microspingus alticola
- Nesospiza wilkinsi
- Poospiza garleppi
- Poospiza rubecula
- Sporophila iberaensis
- Sporophila maximiliani
- Sporophila palustris
- Tangara cabanisi

===== Tityridae =====
- Iodopleura pipra
- Pachyramphus spodiurus

===== Troglodytidae =====
- Cistothorus apolinari
- Ferminia cerverai
- Thryophilus sernai

===== Turdidae =====
- Cichlopsis leucogenys
- Geokichla guttata
- Turdus swalesi

===== Tyrannidae =====
- Anairetes alpinus
- Myiarchus semirufus
- Myiotheretes pernix
- Phyllomyias urichi
- Phylloscartes beckeri
- Phylloscartes roquettei
- Poecilotriccus luluae
- Pogonotriccus lanyoni
- Tyrannus cubensis

===== Vangidae =====
- Cyanolanius comorensis
- Prionops gabela
- Xenopirostris damii

===== Vireonidae =====
- Vireo masteri

===== Zosteropidae =====
- Dasycrotapha speciosa
- Rukia ruki
- Zosterops luteirostris
- Zosterops saypani
- Zosterops silvanus
- Zosterornis nigrorum

==== Pelecaniformes ====
===== Ardeidae =====
- Ardea humbloti
- Ardeola idae
- Botaurus poiciloptilus
- Gorsachius goisagi
- Gorsachius magnificus

===== Threskiornithidae =====
- Nipponia nippon
- Platalea minor
- Threskiornis bernieri

==== Piciformes ====
===== Bucconidae =====
- Malacoptila minor

===== Lybiidae =====
- Lybius leucogaster

===== Picidae =====
- Celeus obrieni
- Chrysocolaptes erythrocephalus
- Chrysocolaptes xanthocephalus
- Meiglyptes tristis
- Picumnus steindachneri
- Picumnus varzeae

===== Ramphastidae =====
- Aulacorhynchus huallagae
- Pteroglossus bitorquatus
- Ramphastos ariel

==== Podicipediformes ====
===== Podicipedidae =====
- Rollandia microptera

==== Procellariiformes ====
===== Diomedeidae =====
- Diomedea antipodensis
- Diomedea sanfordi
- Phoebetria fusca
- Thalassarche carteri
- Thalassarche chlororhynchos
- Thalassarche chrysostoma

===== Hydrobatidae =====
- Hydrobates homochroa

===== Oceanitidae =====
- Nesofregetta fuliginosa

===== Procellariidae =====
- Pachyptila macgillivrayi
- Pelecanoides garnotii
- Procellaria westlandica
- Pterodroma alba
- Pterodroma atrata
- Pterodroma baraui
- Pterodroma cahow
- Pterodroma hasitata
- Pterodroma incerta
- Pterodroma madeira
- Puffinus bannermani
- Puffinus huttoni
- Puffinus newelli

==== Psittaciformes ====
===== Cacatuidae =====
- Cacatua alba
- Zanda baudinii
- Zanda latirostris

===== Psittacidae =====
- Amazona auropalliata
- Amazona diadema
- Amazona finschi
- Amazona imperialis
- Amazona lilacina
- Amazona oratrix
- Amazona vinacea
- Amazona viridigenalis
- Anodorhynchus leari
- Ara ambiguus
- Ara rubrogenys
- Aratinga solstitialis
- Brotogeris pyrrhoptera
- Cyclopsitta coxeni
- Eos histrio
- Loriculus flosculus
- Lorius domicella
- Ognorhynchus icterotis
- Pezoporus occidentalis
- Pionites leucogaster
- Prioniturus luconensis
- Psephotellus chrysopterygius
- Psittacula eques
- Psittacus erithacus
- Psittacus timneh
- Pyrrhura amazonum
- Pyrrhura caeruleiceps
- Pyrrhura eisenmanni
- Pyrrhura griseipectus
- Pyrrhura orcesi
- Pyrrhura pfrimeri
- Pyrrhura viridicata
- Rhynchopsitta pachyrhyncha
- Rhynchopsitta terrisi
- Vini kuhlii

===== Strigopidae =====
- Nestor meridionalis
- Nestor notabilis

==== Sphenisciformes ====
===== Spheniscidae =====
- Eudyptes moseleyi
- Eudyptes sclateri
- Megadyptes antipodes
- Spheniscus demersus
- Spheniscus mendiculus

==== Strigiformes ====
===== Strigidae =====
- Bubo blakistoni
- Heteroglaux blewitti
- Ninox leventisi
- Ninox rumseyi
- Ninox spilonotus
- Ninox sumbaensis
- Otus alfredi
- Otus capnodes
- Otus insularis
- Otus ireneae
- Otus moheliensis
- Otus pauliani
- Otus thilohoffmanni
- Xenoglaux loweryi

===== Tytonidae =====
- Phodilus prigoginei

==== Suliformes ====
===== Phalacrocoracidae =====
- Phalacrocorax capensis
- Phalacrocorax featherstoni
- Phalacrocorax neglectus

===== Sulidae =====
- Morus capensis
- Papasula abbotti

=== Cephalaspidomorphi ===
==== Petromyzontiformes ====
===== Petromyzontidae =====
- Entosphenus macrostoma
- Lampetra lanceolata

=== Chondrichthyes ===
==== Carcharhiniformes ====
===== Carcharhinidae =====
- Carcharhinus borneensis
- Carcharhinus leiodon
- Glyphis glyphis
- Lamiopsis temminckii
- Negaprion acutidens (Southeast Asia subpopulation)

===== Pentanchidae =====
- Holohalaelurus favus
- Holohalaelurus punctatus

===== Sphyrnidae =====
- Eusphyra blochii
- Sphyrna lewini
- Sphyrna lewini (Eastern Central and Southeast Pacific subpopulation)
- Sphyrna lewini (Northwest and Western Central Atlantic subpopulation)
- Sphyrna lewini (Western Indian Ocean subpopulation)
- Sphyrna mokarran

===== Triakidae =====
- Hemitriakis leucoperiptera
- Mustelus schmitti
- Triakis acutipinna

==== Lamniformes ====
===== Cetorhinidae =====
- Cetorhinus maximus (Northeast Atlantic subpopulation)
- Cetorhinus maximus (North Pacific subpopulation)

===== Lamnidae =====
- Lamna nasus (Northwest Atlantic subpopulation)

==== Myliobatiformes ====
===== Aetobatidae =====
- Aetobatus flagellum

===== Dasyatidae =====
- Fluvitrygon kittipongi
- Fluvitrygon oxyrhyncha
- Fluvitrygon signifer
- Fontitrygon margarita
- Fontitrygon ukpam
- Hemitrygon laosensis
- Pastinachus solocirostris
- Urogymnus polylepis

===== Myliobatidae =====
- Aetomylaeus maculatus
- Aetomylaeus milvus
- Aetomylaeus vespertilio

==== Orectolobiformes ====
===== Rhincodontidae =====
- Rhincodon typus

===== Stegostomidae =====
- Stegostoma fasciatum
- Stegostoma fasciatum (Indian Ocean-Southeast Asian subpopulation)

==== Rajiformes ====
===== Arhynchobatidae =====
- Atlantoraja castelnaui
- Bathyraja griseocauda

===== Mobulidae =====
- Mobula mobular

===== Potamotrygonidae =====
- Potamotrygon tigrina

===== Rajidae =====
- Dipturus canutus
- Dipturus laevis
- Leucoraja circularis
- Leucoraja ocellata
- Malacoraja senta
- Raja radula
- Raja undulata
- Rostroraja alba
- Zearaja maugeana

===== Rhinopteridae =====
- Rhinoptera brasiliensis

===== Torpedinidae =====
- Torpedo adenensis

===== Urolophidae =====
- Urolophus orarius

==== Rhinopristiformes ====
===== Glaucostegidae =====
- Glaucostegus cemiculus

===== Pristidae =====
- Anoxypristis cuspidata
- Pristis clavata

===== Rhinidae =====
- Rhynchobatus luebberti

===== Rhinobatidae =====
- Rhinobatos rhinobatos

==== Squaliformes ====
===== Centrophoridae =====
- Centrophorus harrissoni

===== Squalidae =====
- Squalus acanthias (Mediterranean subpopulation)
- Squalus acanthias (Northwest Atlantic subpopulation)

==== Squatiniformes ====
===== Squatinidae =====
- Squatina argentina
- Squatina formosa
- Squatina guggenheim
- Squatina guggenheim (Brazilian subpopulation)
- Squatina occulta
- Squatina punctata

=== Mammalia ===
==== Afrosoricida ====
===== Chrysochloridae =====
- Amblysomus marleyi
- Chrysospalax trevelyani
- Cryptochloris zyli
- Neamblysomus gunningi
- Neamblysomus julianae

===== Tenrecidae =====
- Microgale jenkinsae
- Microgale jobihely

==== Carnivora ====
===== Ailuridae =====
- Ailurus fulgens

===== Canidae =====
- Canis simensis
- Cuon alpinus
- Lycalopex fulvipes
- Lycaon pictus

===== Eupleridae =====
- Eupleres major
- Galidictis grandidieri
- Mungotictis decemlineata

===== Felidae =====
- Catopuma badia
- Leopardus jacobita
- Lynx pardinus
- Neofelis diardi borneensis
- Neofelis diardi diardi
- Panthera leo persica
- Panthera tigris
- Panthera tigris altaica
- Panthera tigris corbetti
- Panthera tigris tigris
- Prionailurus planiceps

===== Mustelidae =====
- Enhydra lutris
- Lontra felina
- Lontra provocax
- Lutra sumatrana
- Melogale everetti
- Mustela nigripes
- Pteronura brasiliensis

===== Otariidae =====
- Arctocephalus galapagoensis
- Eumetopias jubatus jubatus
- Neophoca cinerea
- Phocarctos hookeri
- Zalophus wollebaeki

===== Phocidae =====
- Monachus monachus
- Neomonachus schauinslandi
- Phoca vitulina mellonae
- Pusa caspica
- Pusa hispida saimensis

===== Procyonidae =====
- Nasuella meridensis

===== Viverridae =====
- Chrotogale owstoni
- Cynogale bennettii
- Viverra megaspila

==== Cetartiodactyla ====
===== Balaenidae =====
- Balaena mysticetus (East Greenland-Svalbard-Barents Sea subpopulation)
- Balaena mysticetus (Okhotsk Sea subpopulation)
- Eubalaena glacialis
- Eubalaena japonica

===== Balaenopteridae =====
- Balaenoptera borealis
- Balaenoptera musculus
- Balaenoptera physalus
- Megaptera novaeangliae (Arabian Sea subpopulation)
- Megaptera novaeangliae (Oceania subpopulation)

===== Bovidae =====
- Alcelaphus buselaphus lelwel
- Alcelaphus buselaphus swaynei
- Arabitragus jayakari
- Bos javanicus
- Bubalus arnee
- Bubalus depressicornis
- Bubalus quarlesi
- Capra caucasica
- Capra walie
- Cephalophus jentinki
- Cephalophus nigrifrons rubidus
- Cephalophus spadix
- Damaliscus lunatus korrigum
- Damaliscus lunatus topi
- Eudorcas tilonura
- Gazella gazella
- Gazella leptoceros
- Gazella spekei
- Kobus leche kafuensis
- Kobus megaceros
- Nanger granti petersii
- Nilgiritragus hylocrius
- Oreotragus oreotragus porteousi
- Procapra przewalskii
- Pseudois nayaur schaeferi
- Redunca fulvorufula
- Redunca fulvorufula adamauae
- Saiga tatarica mongolica
- Tragelaphus buxtoni

===== Cervidae =====
- Axis calamianensis
- Axis porcinus
- Dama mesopotamica
- Hippocamelus bisulcus
- Rucervus eldii
- Rusa alfredi

===== Delphinidae =====
- Cephalorhynchus hectori
- Delphinus delphis (Mediterranean subpopulation)
- Orcaella brevirostris
- Sousa plumbea
- Tursiops truncatus ponticus

===== Giraffidae =====
- Okapia johnstoni

===== Hippopotamidae =====
- Choeropsis liberiensis

===== Moschidae =====
- Moschus anhuiensis
- Moschus berezovskii
- Moschus chrysogaster
- Moschus cupreus
- Moschus fuscus
- Moschus leucogaster

===== Phocoenidae =====
- Neophocaena asiaeorientalis
- Phocoena phocoena relicta

===== Physeteridae =====
- Physeter macrocephalus (Mediterranean subpopulation)

===== Platanistidae =====
- Platanista gangetica
- Platanista gangetica gangetica
- Platanista gangetica minor

===== Suidae =====
- Babyrousa togeanensis
- Sus verrucosus
- Sus verrucosus blouchi

===== Tayassuidae =====
- Catagonus wagneri

===== Tragulidae =====
- Tragulus nigricans

==== Chiroptera ====
===== Emballonuridae =====
- Emballonura semicaudata
- Saccopteryx antioquensis

===== Hipposideridae =====
- Hipposideros coxi

===== Miniopteridae =====
- Miniopterus fuscus
- Miniopterus robustior

===== Molossidae =====
- Chaerephon bregullae
- Chaerephon tomensis
- Molossops aequatorianus
- Mormopterus acetabulosus
- Tomopeas ravum

===== Mormoopidae =====
- Pteronotus paraguanensis

===== Phyllostomidae =====
- Chiroderma improvisum
- Leptonycteris nivalis
- Lonchophylla bokermanni
- Lonchophylla dekeyseri
- Lonchorhina fernandezi
- Sturnira nana

===== Pteropodidae =====
- Acerodon humilis
- Acerodon jubatus
- Latidens salimalii
- Myonycteris brachycephala
- Neopteryx frosti
- Nyctimene rabori
- Pteralopex anceps
- Pteralopex atrata
- Pteropus fundatus
- Pteropus mariannus
- Pteropus melanopogon
- Pteropus niger
- Pteropus nitendiensis
- Pteropus pselaphon
- Pteropus rennelli
- Pteropus rodricensis

===== Rhinolophidae =====
- Rhinolophus belligerator
- Rhinolophus cognatus
- Rhinolophus maclaudi
- Rhinolophus montanus
- Rhinolophus proconsulis
- Rhinolophus ziama

===== Rhinopomatidae =====
- Rhinopoma hadramauticum

===== Vespertilionidae =====
- Chalinolobus neocaledonicus
- Eptesicus guadeloupensis
- Eptesicus japonensis
- Kerivoula africana
- Murina ryukyuana
- Myotis atacamensis
- Myotis findleyi
- Myotis peninsularis
- Myotis planiceps
- Myotis pruinosus
- Neoromicia malagasyensis
- Neoromicia roseveari
- Pipistrellus endoi
- Rhogeessa genowaysi

==== Dasyuromorphia ====
===== Dasyuridae =====
- Dasyurus hallucatus
- Dasyurus viverrinus
- Parantechinus apicalis
- Sarcophilus harrisii

===== Myrmecobiidae =====
- Myrmecobius fasciatus

==== Diprotodontia ====
===== Macropodidae =====
- Dendrolagus goodfellowi
- Dendrolagus matschiei
- Dendrolagus mbaiso
- Dendrolagus notatus
- Petrogale concinna
- Petrogale persephone
- Thylogale calabyi
- Thylogale lanatus

===== Petauridae =====
- Dactylopsila tatei
- Petaurus gracilis

===== Phalangeridae =====
- Phalanger alexandrae
- Phalanger lullulae

===== Potoroidae =====
- Bettongia tropica

==== Eulipotyphla ====
===== Erinaceidae =====
- Neohylomys hainanensis
- Podogymnura aureospinula

===== Solenodontidae =====
- Atopogale cubana
- Solenodon paradoxus

===== Soricidae =====
- Chimarrogale phaeura
- Crocidura ansellorum
- Crocidura bottegoides
- Crocidura canariensis
- Crocidura desperata
- Crocidura hikmiya
- Crocidura mdumai
- Crocidura miya
- Crocidura negrina
- Crocidura orii
- Crocidura phaeura
- Crocidura picea
- Crocidura stenocephala
- Crocidura tansaniana
- Crocidura tarella
- Crocidura thomensis
- Cryptotis endersi
- Cryptotis griseoventris
- Cryptotis merus
- Feroculus feroculus
- Myosorex blarina
- Myosorex geata
- Myosorex gnoskei
- Myosorex kihaulei
- Myosorex rumpii
- Solisorex pearsoni
- Sorex pribilofensis
- Suncus aequatorius
- Suncus dayi
- Suncus fellowesgordoni
- Suncus mertensi
- Suncus zeylanicus
- Sylvisorex isabellae
- Sylvisorex morio

===== Talpidae =====
- Desmana moschata
- Mogera etigo

==== Lagomorpha ====
===== Leporidae =====
- Caprolagus hispidus
- Lepus flavigularis
- Lepus hainanus
- Pentalagus furnessi
- Romerolagus diazi
- Sylvilagus cognatus
- Sylvilagus graysoni
- Sylvilagus insonus
- Sylvilagus robustus

===== Ochotonidae =====
- Ochotona argentata
- Ochotona hoffmanni
- Ochotona iliensis
- Ochotona koslowi

==== Macroscelidea ====
===== Macroscelididae =====
- Rhynchocyon chrysopygus

==== Peramelemorphia ====
===== Peramelidae =====
- Echymipera davidi
- Peroryctes broadbenti
- Rhynchomeles prattorum

==== Perissodactyla ====
===== Equidae =====
- Equus ferus
- Equus ferus przewalskii
- Equus grevyi
- Equus hemionus kulan
- Equus hemionus onager

===== Tapiridae =====
- Tapirus bairdii
- Tapirus indicus
- Tapirus pinchaque

==== Pholidota ====
===== Manidae =====
- Manis crassicaudata
- Manis culionensis

==== Primates ====
===== Atelidae =====
- Alouatta pigra
- Alouatta ululata
- Ateles belzebuth
- Ateles chamek
- Ateles geoffroyi
- Ateles geoffroyi ornatus
- Ateles geoffroyi yucatanensis
- Ateles marginatus
- Brachyteles arachnoides
- Lagothrix cana
- Lagothrix cana cana

===== Callitrichidae =====
- Callithrix flaviceps
- Leontopithecus chrysomelas
- Leontopithecus chrysopygus
- Leontopithecus rosalia
- Saguinus bicolor
- Saguinus leucopus

===== Cebidae =====
- Cebus malitiosus
- Cebus versicolor
- Saimiri oerstedii citrinellus
- Saimiri oerstedii oerstedii
- Sapajus robustus

===== Cercopithecidae =====
- Allochrocebus preussi
- Allochrocebus preussi insularis
- Allochrocebus preussi preussi
- Cercocebus galeritus
- Cercocebus lunulatus
- Cercocebus sanjei
- Cercopithecus erythrogaster erythrogaster
- Cercopithecus mitis kandti
- Cercopithecus roloway
- Colobus angolensis prigoginei
- Colobus guereza percivali
- Colobus satanas satanas
- Macaca maura
- Macaca munzala
- Macaca silenus
- Macaca sinica
- Macaca sinica aurifrons
- Macaca sinica opisthomelas
- Macaca sinica sinica
- Macaca sylvanus
- Mandrillus leucophaeus
- Mandrillus leucophaeus leucophaeus
- Mandrillus leucophaeus poensis
- Nasalis larvatus
- Nasalis larvatus larvatus
- Nasalis larvatus orientalis
- Piliocolobus badius
- Piliocolobus gordonorum
- Piliocolobus kirkii
- Piliocolobus pennantii
- Piliocolobus rufomitratus
- Piliocolobus temminckii
- Piliocolobus tephrosceles
- Presbytis comata
- Presbytis hosei canicrus
- Presbytis hosei sabana
- Presbytis melalophos
- Presbytis melalophos mitrata
- Presbytis melalophos sumatranus
- Presbytis potenziani
- Presbytis potenziani siberu
- Pygathrix nemaeus
- Pygathrix nigripes
- Rhinopithecus bieti
- Rhinopithecus brelichi
- Rhinopithecus roxellana
- Rhinopithecus roxellana hubeiensis
- Rhinopithecus roxellana qinlingensis
- Rhinopithecus roxellana roxellana
- Semnopithecus ajax
- Semnopithecus priam thersites
- Trachypithecus francoisi
- Trachypithecus geei
- Trachypithecus germaini
- Trachypithecus hatinhensis
- Trachypithecus phayrei
- Trachypithecus phayrei crepuscula
- Trachypithecus phayrei phayrei
- Trachypithecus phayrei shanicus
- Trachypithecus pileatus durga
- Trachypithecus pileatus pileatus
- Trachypithecus pileatus tenebricus
- Trachypithecus shortridgei
- Trachypithecus vetulus
- Trachypithecus vetulus monticola
- Trachypithecus vetulus philbricki
- Trachypithecus vetulus vetulus

===== Cheirogaleidae =====
- Microcebus arnholdi
- Microcebus berthae
- Microcebus bongolavensis
- Microcebus danfossi
- Microcebus jollyae
- Microcebus macarthurii
- Microcebus margotmarshae
- Microcebus mittermeieri
- Microcebus ravelobensis
- Microcebus sambiranensis
- Microcebus simmonsi
- Mirza coquereli
- Mirza zaza
- Phaner electromontis
- Phaner pallescens
- Phaner parienti

===== Daubentoniidae =====
- Daubentonia madagascariensis

===== Galagidae =====
- Euoticus pallidus pallidus
- Galagoides zanzibaricus zanzibaricus
- Sciurocheirus alleni alleni

===== Hominidae =====
- Pan paniscus
- Pan troglodytes
- Pan troglodytes ellioti
- Pan troglodytes schweinfurthii
- Pan troglodytes troglodytes

===== Hylobatidae =====
- Hoolock hoolock
- Hylobates abbotti
- Hylobates agilis
- Hylobates albibarbis
- Hylobates funereus
- Hylobates klossii
- Hylobates lar
- Hylobates lar carpenteri
- Hylobates lar lar
- Hylobates lar vestitus
- Hylobates moloch
- Hylobates muelleri
- Hylobates pileatus
- Nomascus gabriellae
- Nomascus siki
- Symphalangus syndactylus

===== Indriidae =====
- Avahi betsileo
- Avahi cleesei
- Avahi meridionalis
- Avahi mooreorum
- Avahi occidentalis
- Avahi unicolor
- Propithecus coquereli
- Propithecus coronatus
- Propithecus deckenii
- Propithecus edwardsi
- Propithecus verreauxi

===== Lemuridae =====
- Eulemur albifrons
- Eulemur collaris
- Eulemur coronatus
- Eulemur sanfordi
- Hapalemur griseus gilberti
- Lemur catta

===== Lepilemuridae =====
- Lepilemur ahmansonorum
- Lepilemur ankaranensis
- Lepilemur betsileo
- Lepilemur edwardsi
- Lepilemur grewcockorum
- Lepilemur hollandorum
- Lepilemur hubbardorum
- Lepilemur leucopus
- Lepilemur microdon
- Lepilemur milanoii
- Lepilemur mittermeieri
- Lepilemur otto
- Lepilemur randrianasoloi
- Lepilemur scottorum
- Lepilemur wrightae

===== Lorisidae =====
- Loris lydekkerianus grandis
- Loris lydekkerianus nordicus
- Loris tardigradus
- Loris tardigradus nycticeboides
- Loris tardigradus tardigradus

===== Pitheciidae =====
- Callicebus coimbrai
- Chiropotes albinasus
- Chiropotes utahickae
- Plecturocebus modestus
- Plecturocebus olallae

===== Tarsiidae =====
- Tarsius bancanus bancanus
- Tarsius bancanus saltator
- Tarsius pelengensis
- Tarsius sangirensis

==== Proboscidea ====
===== Elephantidae =====
- Elephas maximus

==== Rodentia ====
===== Capromyidae =====
- Geocapromys brownii
- Mesocapromys angelcabrerai
- Mesocapromys auritus
- Plagiodontia aedium

===== Chinchillidae =====
- Chinchilla chinchilla
- Chinchilla lanigera

===== Cricetidae =====
- Alticola olchonensis
- Anotomys leander
- Euryoryzomys lamia
- Gyldenstolpia fronto
- Habromys delicatulus
- Habromys simulatus
- Megadontomys cryophilus
- Megadontomys nelsoni
- Megadontomys thomasi
- Microakodontomys transitorius
- Microtus oaxacensis
- Microtus umbrosus
- Mindomys hammondi
- Nelsonia goldmani
- Neotoma angustapalata
- Oryzomys gorgasi
- Oxymycterus hucucha
- Oxymycterus josei
- Peromyscus madrensis
- Peromyscus melanocarpus
- Peromyscus melanurus
- Peromyscus ochraventer
- Peromyscus sejugis
- Peromyscus winkelmanni
- Phyllotis definitus
- Reithrodontomys bakeri
- Reithrodontomys raviventris
- Rheomys mexicanus
- Thomasomys hylophilus
- Thomasomys monochromos
- Thomasomys rosalinda
- Wilfredomys oenax
- Xenomys nelsoni

===== Ctenomyidae =====
- Ctenomys australis
- Ctenomys bonettoi
- Ctenomys flamarioni
- Ctenomys occultus
- Ctenomys pilarensis
- Ctenomys rionegrensis

===== Dasyproctidae =====
- Dasyprocta ruatanica

===== Dipodidae =====
- Sicista armenica
- Sicista kazbegica

===== Echimyidae =====
- Callistomys pictus
- Phyllomys brasiliensis
- Phyllomys lundi
- Phyllomys thomasi
- Trinomys moojeni
- Trinomys yonenagae

===== Geomyidae =====
- Geomys tropicalis
- Zygogeomys trichopus

===== Heteromyidae =====
- Dipodomys ingens
- Dipodomys stephensi
- Heteromys nelsoni
- Heteromys oasicus
- Heteromys spectabilis

===== Muridae =====
- Batomys russatus
- Bunomys coelestis
- Bunomys prolatus
- Crateromys heaneyi
- Crateromys schadenbergi
- Dasymys montanus
- Diplothrix legata
- Echiothrix leucura
- Gerbillus hesperinus
- Grammomys gigas
- Hadromys humei
- Hapalomys longicaudatus
- Hybomys badius
- Hybomys basilii
- Hylomyscus baeri
- Hylomyscus grandis
- Lamottemys okuensis
- Lophuromys dieterleni
- Lophuromys pseudosikapusi
- Mallomys gunung
- Margaretamys christinae
- Maxomys wattsi
- Melomys aerosus
- Melomys bannisteri
- Melomys caurinus
- Melomys matambuai
- Melomys talaudium
- Meriones dahli
- Mus famulus
- Mus fernandoni
- Nesokia bunnii
- Nesoromys ceramicus
- Niviventer hinpoon
- Notomys aquilo
- Otomys barbouri
- Otomys burtoni
- Paraleptomys rufilatus
- Paramelomys gressitti
- Paulamys naso
- Pogonomys fergussoniensis
- Praomys morio
- Praomys obscurus
- Rattus burrus
- Rattus hainaldi
- Rattus montanus
- Rattus ranjiniae
- Rattus simalurensis
- Rattus vandeuseni
- Solomys salebrosus
- Solomys sapientis
- Sundamys maxi
- Tokudaia osimensis
- Tokudaia tokunoshimensis
- Uromys rex
- Vandeleuria nilagirica
- Vandeleuria nolthenii

===== Nesomyidae =====
- Eliurus penicillatus
- Eliurus petteri
- Hypogeomys antimena
- Macrotarsomys ingens
- Mystromys albicaudatus
- Nesomys lambertoni
- Voalavo antsahabensis

===== Sciuridae =====
- Ammospermophilus nelsoni
- Cynomys mexicanus
- Cynomys parvidens
- Eupetaurus cinereus
- Hylopetes sipora
- Iomys sipora
- Marmota sibirica
- Neotamias palmeri
- Otospermophilus beecheyi atricapillus
- Paraxerus vincenti
- Pteromyscus pulverulentus
- Tamiasciurus mearnsi
- Xerospermophilus perotensis

===== Spalacidae =====
- Spalax arenarius
- Tachyoryctes macrocephalus

==== Scandentia ====
===== Tupaiidae =====
- Tupaia nicobarica

==== Sirenia ====
===== Trichechidae =====
- Trichechus manatus latirostris
- Trichechus manatus manatus

=== Myxini ===
==== Myxiniformes ====
===== Myxinidae =====
- Myxine paucidens
- Paramyxine taiwanae

=== Reptilia ===
==== Squamata ====
===== Agamidae =====
- Calotes liocephalus
- Ceratophora tennentii
- Otocryptis beddomii
- Phrynocephalus rossikowi
- Tympanocryptis condaminensis
- Tympanocryptis pinguicolla
- Tympanocryptis wilsoni

===== Amphisbaenidae =====
- Amphisbaena caudalis
- Amphisbaena fenestrata
- Amphisbaena hyporissor
- Cynisca oligopholis

===== Anguidae =====
- Abronia aurita
- Abronia chiszari
- Abronia deppii
- Abronia fimbriata
- Abronia fuscolabialis
- Abronia gaiophantasma
- Abronia graminea
- Abronia martindelcampoi
- Abronia matudai
- Abronia meledona
- Abronia montecristoi
- Abronia salvadorensis
- Barisia herrerae
- Barisia rudicollis
- Celestus agasepsoides
- Celestus barbouri
- Celestus bivittatus
- Celestus darlingtoni
- Celestus haetianus
- Celestus hewardi
- Celestus macrotus
- Celestus maculatus
- Celestus molesworthi
- Celestus montanus
- Gerrhonotus parvus
- Mesaspis juarezi
- Ophisaurus ceroni

===== Anniellidae =====
- Anniella geronimensis

===== Boidae =====
- Chilabothrus granti
- Chilabothrus monensis
- Corallus blombergi
- Corallus cropanii

===== Bolyeridae =====
- Casarea dussumieri

===== Calamariidae =====
- Calamaria pfefferi
- Calamaria yunnanensis
- Pseudorabdion montanum

===== Carphodactylidae =====
- Phyllurus gulbaru
- Saltuarius eximius

===== Chamaeleonidae =====
- Archaius tigris
- Bradypodion caeruleogula
- Bradypodion caffer
- Bradypodion taeniabronchum
- Brookesia bekolosy
- Brookesia decaryi
- Brookesia dentata
- Brookesia exarmata
- Brookesia karchei
- Brookesia lineata
- Brookesia minima
- Brookesia perarmata
- Brookesia peyrierasi
- Brookesia ramanantsoai
- Brookesia tristis
- Brookesia valerieae
- Calumma andringitraense
- Calumma furcifer
- Calumma gallus
- Calumma glawi
- Calumma globifer
- Calumma hilleniusi
- Calumma vencesi
- Calumma vohibola
- Furcifer balteatus
- Furcifer minor
- Furcifer nicosiai
- Kinyongia magomberae
- Kinyongia matschiei
- Kinyongia multituberculata
- Kinyongia tenuis
- Kinyongia vosseleri
- Nadzikambia mlanjensis
- Rhampholeon platyceps
- Rhampholeon spinosus
- Rhampholeon temporalis
- Rhampholeon viridis
- Trioceros laterispinis
- Trioceros perreti
- Trioceros pfefferi

===== Colubridae =====
- Ahaetulla perroteti
- Boiga bourreti
- Boiga saengsomi
- Euprepiophis perlacea
- Ficimia hardyi
- Hierophis cypriensis
- Oligodon meyerinkii
- Oxybelis wilsoni
- Pituophis ruthveni
- Tantilla flavilineata
- Tantilla lempira
- Tantilla oolitica
- Tantilla shawi
- Telescopus hoogstraali
- Thrasops schmidti

===== Cordylidae =====
- Cordylus meculae
- Platysaurus monotropis

===== Crotaphytidae =====
- Crotaphytus antiquus
- Gambelia sila

===== Dactyloidae =====
- Anolis ahli
- Anolis amplisquamosus
- Anolis breedlovei
- Anolis cusuco
- Anolis guafe
- Anolis haetianus
- Anolis hobartsmithi
- Anolis koopmani
- Anolis loveridgei
- Anolis marron
- Anolis proboscis
- Anolis pygmaeus
- Anolis ruizii
- Anolis strahmi

===== Diplodactylidae =====
- Bavayia exsuccida
- Bavayia goroensis
- Bavayia ornata
- Dierogekko validiclavis
- Eurydactylodes symmetricus
- Lucasium occultum
- Rhacodactylus trachyrhynchus

===== Dipsadidae =====
- Adelphicos daryi
- Adelphicos ibarrorum
- Alsophis rijgersmaei
- Alsophis sanctonum
- Arrhyton tanyplectum
- Atractus carrioni
- Atractus duboisi
- Atractus occidentalis
- Calamodontophis ronaldoi
- Chapinophis xanthocheilus
- Chersodromus rubriventris
- Enulius roatenensis
- Erythrolamprus triscalis
- Geophis fulvoguttatus
- Geophis talamancae
- Hypsirhynchus polylepis
- Ialtris agyrtes
- Rhadinaea marcellae
- Rhadinaea montana
- Rhadinaea stadelmani
- Rhadinella hempsteadae
- Rhadinella posadasi
- Saphenophis sneiderni
- Sibon lamari
- Thermophis zhaoermii
- Trimetopon simile

===== Elapidae =====
- Aipysurus fuscus
- Elapsoidea chelazzii
- Elapsoidea nigra
- Hemiaspis damelii
- Micrurus catamayensis
- Ogmodon vitianus

===== Eublepharidae =====
- Goniurosaurus catbaensis
- Goniurosaurus orientalis
- Goniurosaurus splendens

===== Gekkonidae =====
- Cnemaspis goaensis
- Cnemaspis occidentalis
- Cnemaspis psychedelica
- Cnemaspis wynadensis
- Cyrtodactylus sadleiri
- Ebenavia maintimainty
- Gehyra barea
- Luperosaurus joloensis
- Luperosaurus macgregori
- Lygodactylus intermedius
- Lygodactylus ornatus
- Lygodactylus roavolana
- Mediodactylus amictopholis
- Paragehyra gabriellae
- Paroedura masobe
- Paroedura sanctijohannis
- Paroedura tanjaka
- Phelsuma flavigularis
- Phelsuma guentheri
- Phelsuma klemmeri
- Phelsuma robertmertensi
- Phelsuma roesleri
- Phelsuma seippi
- Phelsuma serraticauda
- Phelsuma vanheygeni
- Uroplatus guentheri
- Uroplatus malahelo
- Uroplatus pietschmanni

===== Gerrhosauridae =====
- Tetradactylus udzungwensis
- Zonosaurus subunicolor

===== Gymnophthalmidae =====
- Anadia blakei
- Anadia brevifrontalis
- Anadia pamplonensis
- Anadia pariaensis
- Calyptommatus confusionibus
- Echinosaura brachycephala
- Echinosaura sulcarostrum
- Macropholidus annectens
- Proctoporus cephalolineatus
- Riama balneator
- Riama columbiana
- Riama crypta
- Riama labionis
- Riama oculata
- Riama petrorum
- Riama simotera

===== Homalopsidae =====
- Cerberus microlepis
- Enhydris vorisi

===== Hoplocercidae =====
- Morunasaurus groi

===== Iguanidae =====
- Amblyrhynchus cristatus mertensi
- Amblyrhynchus cristatus nanus
- Brachylophus bulabula
- Brachylophus fasciatus
- Ctenosaura flavidorsalis
- Ctenosaura melanosterna
- Ctenosaura oedirhina
- Ctenosaura palearis
- Ctenosaura quinquecariniata
- Cyclura cychlura cychlura
- Cyclura cychlura inornata
- Cyclura lewisi
- Cyclura rileyi
- Cyclura rileyi nuchalis
- Cyclura stejnegeri

===== Lacertidae =====
- Acanthodactylus ahmaddisii
- Acanthodactylus blanci
- Algyroides marchi
- Darevskia bendimahiensis
- Darevskia clarkorum
- Darevskia kopetdaghica
- Darevskia rostombekovi
- Darevskia uzzelli
- Iberolacerta aranica
- Iberolacerta aurelioi
- Iberolacerta cyreni
- Parvilacerta fraasii
- Philochortus zolii
- Phoenicolacerta kulzeri
- Podarcis carbonelli
- Podarcis cretensis
- Podarcis lilfordi
- Psammodromus microdactylus
- Takydromus dorsalis
- Takydromus toyamai

===== Lamprophiidae =====
- Lamprophis geometricus

===== Leiosauridae =====
- Pristidactylus alvaroi
- Pristidactylus valeriae
- Pristidactylus volcanensis

===== Leptotyphlopidae =====
- Mitophis pyrites
- Tetracheilostoma breuili

===== Liolaemidae =====
- Liolaemus arambarensis
- Liolaemus fabiani
- Liolaemus forsteri
- Liolaemus insolitus
- Liolaemus isabelae
- Liolaemus leopardinus
- Liolaemus loboi
- Liolaemus lorenzmuelleri
- Liolaemus manueli
- Liolaemus multimaculatus
- Liolaemus poconchilensis
- Liolaemus riodamas
- Liolaemus robertoi
- Liolaemus salinicola
- Liolaemus scapularis
- Liolaemus stolzmanni
- Liolaemus torresi
- Phymaturus bibronii
- Phymaturus darwini
- Phymaturus tenebrosus

===== Natricidae =====
- Hebius concelarum
- Hebius metusium
- Hologerrhum dermali
- Lycognathophis seychellensis
- Opisthotropis alcalai
- Thamnophis melanogaster
- Thamnophis mendax

===== Phrynosomatidae =====
- Sceloporus chaneyi
- Sceloporus cyanostictus
- Sceloporus goldmani
- Uma exsul
- Uma inornata
- Urosaurus auriculatus

===== Phyllodactylidae =====
- Phyllodactylus angustidigitus
- Phyllodactylus delsolari
- Phyllodactylus hispaniolae
- Phyllodactylus thompsoni
- Tarentola gigas

===== Pseudoxyrhophiidae =====
- Alluaudina mocquardi
- Heteroliodon fohy
- Liophidium mayottensis
- Lycodryas guentheri
- Lycodryas inopinae
- Phisalixella variabilis
- Pseudoxyrhopus kely
- Thamnosophis martae

===== Pygopodidae =====
- Aprasia litorea
- Delma impar
- Delma tealei

===== Scincidae =====
- Acontias poecilus
- Acontias rieppeli
- Amphiglossus decaryi
- Brachymeles vermis
- Caledoniscincus auratus
- Caledoniscincus chazeaui
- Caledoniscincus orestes
- Caledoniscincus renevieri
- Celatiscincus euryotis
- Celatiscincus similis
- Chalcides mauritanicus
- Chalcides parallelus
- Chalcides simonyi
- Chioninia vaillantii
- Ctenotus kurnbudj
- Ctenotus stuarti
- Cyclodomorphus praealtus
- Dasia subcaerulea
- Emoia adspersa
- Emoia aneityumensis
- Emoia boettgeri
- Emoia campbelli
- Emoia lawesi
- Emoia mokosariniveikau
- Emoia ponapea
- Emoia samoensis
- Emoia trossula
- Eulamprus leuraensis
- Eulamprus tympanum marnieae
- Eurylepis poonaensis
- Eutropis clivicola
- Janetaescincus braueri
- Janetaescincus veseyfitzgeraldi
- Kanakysaurus viviparus
- Kanakysaurus zebratus
- Lankascincus deignani
- Leptosiaphos pauliani
- Lerista ameles
- Lerista haroldi
- Lerista lineata
- Lerista puncticauda
- Liopholis guthega
- Lioscincus steindachneri
- Lissolepis coventryi
- Madascincus macrolepis
- Melanoseps emmrichi
- Nangura spinosa
- Nannoscincus garrulus
- Nannoscincus greeri
- Nannoscincus humectus
- Nannoscincus slevini
- Oligosoma otagense
- Phasmasaurus maruia
- Phoboscincus bocourti
- Pseudemoia cryodroma
- Pseudoacontias angelorum
- Pygomeles petteri
- Sirenoscincus yamagishi
- Spondylurus fulgida
- Spondylurus nitidus
- Spondylurus powelli
- Tiliqua adelaidensis
- Typhlacontias kataviensis
- Tytthoscincus biparietalis
- Voeltzkowia mira

===== Shinisauridae =====
- Shinisaurus crocodilurus

===== Sphaerodactylidae =====
- Gonatodes purpurogularis
- Gonatodes seigliei
- Lepidoblepharis conolepis
- Lepidoblepharis williamsi
- Sphaerodactylus armasi
- Sphaerodactylus asterulus
- Sphaerodactylus beattyi
- Sphaerodactylus cryphius
- Sphaerodactylus dacnicolor
- Sphaerodactylus dimorphicus
- Sphaerodactylus inaguae
- Sphaerodactylus intermedius
- Sphaerodactylus ladae
- Sphaerodactylus mariguanae
- Sphaerodactylus ocoae
- Sphaerodactylus oliveri
- Sphaerodactylus omoglaux
- Sphaerodactylus oxyrhinus
- Sphaerodactylus parkeri
- Sphaerodactylus parthenopion
- Sphaerodactylus perissodactylius
- Sphaerodactylus phyzacinus
- Sphaerodactylus pimienta
- Sphaerodactylus plummeri
- Sphaerodactylus randi
- Sphaerodactylus rhabdotus
- Sphaerodactylus richardsoni
- Sphaerodactylus ruibali
- Sphaerodactylus scapularis
- Sphaerodactylus schwartzi
- Sphaerodactylus semasiops
- Sphaerodactylus storeyae
- Sphaerodactylus thompsoni
- Sphaerodactylus torrei
- Sphaerodactylus zygaena

===== Teiidae =====
- Ameiva provitaae
- Pholidoscelis corax
- Pholidoscelis dorsalis
- Pholidoscelis polops

===== Tropiduridae =====
- Leiocephalus vinculum
- Stenocercus modestus
- Stenocercus varius

===== Typhlopidae =====
- Afrotyphlops gierrai
- Amerotyphlops tasymicris
- Amerotyphlops trinitatus
- Antillotyphlops granti
- Letheobia uluguruensis
- Ramphotyphlops exocoeti
- Ramphotyphlops suluensis
- Typhlops capitulatus
- Typhlops caymanensis
- Typhlops gonavensis
- Typhlops monensis
- Typhlops proancylops
- Typhlops schmutzi
- Typhlops sylleptor
- Typhlops syntherus
- Typhlops tetrathyreus
- Typhlops titanops

===== Uropeltidae =====
- Platyplectrurus madurensis
- Rhinophis travancoricus

===== Varanidae =====
- Varanus mabitang
- Varanus macraei
- Varanus mertensi

===== Viperidae =====
- Atropoides indomitus
- Bitis inornata
- Bothriechis marchi
- Bothrops lojanus
- Crotalus pusillus
- Cryptelytrops kanburiensis
- Macrovipera schweizeri
- Mixcoatlus barbouri
- Mixcoatlus melanurus
- Montivipera albizona
- Montivipera bornmuelleri
- Montivipera latifii
- Popeia buniana
- Protobothrops mangshanensis
- Protobothrops sieversorum
- Protobothrops trungkhanhensis
- Vipera graeca
- Vipera kaznakovi
- Vipera magnifica
- Vipera pontica
- Vipera ursinii rakosiensis
- Viridovipera truongsonensis

===== Xantusiidae =====
- Lepidophyma lipetzi

===== Xenosauridae =====
- Xenosaurus newmanorum
- Xenosaurus platyceps

==== Testudines ====
===== Chelidae =====
- Acanthochelys pallidipectoris
- Chelodina pritchardi
- Elseya bellii
- Elusor macrurus

===== Cheloniidae =====
- Caretta caretta (North East Atlantic subpopulation)
- Chelonia mydas

===== Emydidae =====
- Clemmys guttata
- Emydoidea blandingii
- Glyptemys insculpta
- Graptemys caglei
- Graptemys gibbonsi
- Graptemys pearlensis
- Pseudemys alabamensis
- Terrapene coahuila
- Trachemys adiutrix
- Trachemys taylori

===== Geoemydidae =====
- Batagur dhongoka
- Batagur trivittata
- Cuora flavomarginata
- Cuora mouhotii
- Geoemyda japonica
- Geoemyda spengleri
- Heosemys annandalii
- Heosemys spinosa
- Mauremys mutica
- Mauremys nigricans
- Mauremys reevesii
- Mauremys sinensis
- Orlitia borneensis
- Pangshura sylhetensis
- Sacalia bealei
- Sacalia quadriocellata
- Vijayachelys silvatica

===== Platysternidae =====
- Platysternon megacephalum

===== Testudinidae =====
- Chelonoidis chathamensis
- Chelonoidis vicina
- Indotestudo elongata
- Indotestudo forstenii
- Manouria emys
- Testudo hermanni hermanni

===== Trionychidae =====
- Chitra indica
- Cycloderma frenatum
- Nilssonia formosa
- Palea steindachneri
- Pelochelys cantorii
- Rafetus euphraticus

== Cnidaria ==
=== Anthozoa ===
==== Actiniaria ====
===== Actiniidae =====
- Paranemonia vouliagmeniensis

==== Pennatulacea ====
===== Pennatulidae =====
- Crassophyllum thessalonicae

==== Scleractinia ====
===== Acroporidae =====
- Acropora roseni
- Acropora rudis
- Acropora suharsonoi
- Anacropora spinosa
- Isopora togianensis
- Montipora dilatata
- Montipora setosa

===== Faviidae =====
- Cladocora caespitosa
- Montastraea annularis
- Montastraea faveolata
- Parasimplastrea sheppardi

===== Fungiidae =====
- Cantharellus noumeae
- Lithophyllon ranjithi

===== Meandrinidae =====
- Ctenella chagius

===== Merulinidae =====
- Hydnophora bonsai

===== Mussidae =====
- Lobophyllia serratus

===== Pectiniidae =====
- Pectinia maxima

===== Pocilloporidae =====
- Pocillopora fungiformis
- Stylophora madagascarensis

===== Poritidae =====
- Alveopora excelsa
- Alveopora minuta
- Porites desilveri
- Porites eridani
- Porites ornata

=== Hydrozoa ===
==== Milleporina ====
===== Milleporidae =====
- Millepora striata
- Millepora tuberosa

== Echinodermata ==
=== Holothuroidea ===
==== Aspidochirotida ====
===== Holothuriidae =====
- Holothuria lessoni
- Holothuria nobilis
- Holothuria scabra
- Holothuria whitmaei

===== Stichopodidae =====
- Apostichopus japonicus
- Isostichopus fuscus
- Thelenota ananas

== Mollusca ==
=== Bivalvia ===
==== Unionida ====
===== Etheriidae =====
- Pseudomulleria dalyi

===== Hyriidae =====
- Diplodon dunkerianus
- Diplodon fontaineanus

===== Iridinidae =====
- Mutela langi

===== Margaritiferidae =====
- Cumberlandia monodonta
- Margaritifera homsensis
- Margaritifera laosensis
- Margaritifera margaritifera
- Margaritifera marrianae

===== Unionidae =====
- Alasmidonta arcula
- Alasmidonta atropurpurea
- Alasmidonta triangulata
- Anodonta pseudodopsis
- Arcidens wheeleri
- Coelatura cridlandi
- Coelatura stagnorum
- Cristaria truncata
- Disconaias salinasensis
- Elliptio chipolaensis
- Elliptio spinosa
- Epioblasma capsaeformis
- Epioblasma obliquata obliquata
- Epioblasma triquetra
- Fusconaia cuneolus
- Fusconaia escambia
- Fusconaia lananensis
- Fusconaia masoni
- Hamiota altilis
- Lamprotula contritus
- Lamprotula ponderosa
- Lampsilis higginsii
- Lampsilis powellii
- Lampsilis rafinesqueana
- Medionidus acutissimus
- Medionidus parvulus
- Modellnaia siamensis
- Obovaria rotulata
- Obovaria subrotunda
- Oxynaia diespiter
- Oxynaia micheloti
- Plethobasus cyphyus
- Pleurobema decisum
- Pleurobema pyriforme
- Pleurobema taitianum
- Pleuronaia dolabelloides
- Potamilus amphichaenus
- Potamilus inflatus
- Potomida littoralis
- Prisodontopsis aviculaeformis
- Protunio messageri
- Pseudodon resupinatus
- Ptychobranchus greenii
- Quadrula cylindrica strigillata
- Quadrula intermedia
- Unio abyssinicus
- Unio crassus
- Unio durieui
- Villosa fabalis

==== Venerida ====
===== Cyrenidae =====
- Corbicula madagascariensis
- Corbicula possoensis

===== Sphaeriidae =====
- Eupera degorteri
- Pisidium edlaueri
- Pisidium maasseni
- Sphaerium regularis

=== Cephalopoda ===
==== Octopoda ====
===== Cirroctopodidae =====
- Cirroctopus hochbergi

===== Opisthoteuthidae =====
- Opisthoteuthis mero

=== Gastropoda ===
==== Allogastropoda ====
===== Valvatidae =====
- Valvata klemmi
- Valvata mergella
- Valvata montenegrina

==== Architaenioglossa ====
===== Ampullariidae =====
- Lanistes alexandri
- Lanistes nyassanus
- Lanistes solidus

===== Cyclophoridae =====
- Adelopoma stolli
- Boucardicus carylae
- Boucardicus culminans
- Boucardicus curvifolius
- Boucardicus delicatus
- Boucardicus divei
- Boucardicus esetrae
- Boucardicus magnilobatus
- Boucardicus mahermanae
- Boucardicus randalanai
- Boucardicus victorhernandezi
- Cyathopoma picardense
- Cyclophorus sp. nov. 'cave'
- Cyclophorus sp. nov. 'Periomphalic furrow'

===== Diplommatinidae =====
- Arinia biplicata
- Arinia streptaxiformis
- Diplommatina inflatula
- Diplommatina pyramis
- Hungerfordia pelewensis
- Macropalaina pomatiaeformis
- Opisthostoma dormani
- Opisthostoma simplex
- Palaina taviensis
- Palaina wilsoni

===== Maizaniidae =====
- Maizania hildebrandti thikensis

===== Neocyclotidae =====
- Fijiopoma liberata
- Gonatorhaphe intercostata
- Gonatorhaphe stricta

===== Viviparidae =====
- Anulotaia forcarti
- Bellamya contracta
- Bellamya crawshayi
- Bellamya robertsoni
- Cipangopaludina dianchiensis
- Heterogen longispira
- Margarya bicostata
- Margarya mansuyi
- Margarya melanoides
- Notopala sublineata
- Tulotoma magnifica

==== Cycloneritimorpha ====
===== Helicinidae =====
- Helicina rostrata

===== Neritidae =====
- Neritina coronata
- Theodoxus prevostianus
- Theodoxus subterrelictus
- Theodoxus transversalis

==== Hygrophila ====
===== Lymnaeidae =====
- Fisherola nuttalli
- Lymnaea maroccana
- Radix pinteri
- Radix skutaris
- Stagnicola idahoensis
- Stagnicola kayseris

===== Planorbidae =====
- Africanogyrus starmuehlneri
- Ancylus lapicidus
- Ancylus tapirulus
- Biomphalaria tchadiensis
- Bulinus camerunensis
- Bulinus succinoides
- Ceratophallus crassus
- Ferrissia kavirondica
- Ferrissia toroensis
- Gyraulus cockburni
- Gyraulus crenophilus
- Gyraulus fontinalis
- Gyraulus meierbrooki
- Gyraulus stankovici
- Gyraulus trapezoides
- Planorbis macedonicus

==== Littorinimorpha ====
===== Assimineidae =====
- Assiminea pecos
- Austroassiminea letha
- Eussoia inopina
- Omphalotropis hieroglyphica
- Omphalotropis subsoluta

===== Bithyniidae =====
- Bithynia pesicii
- Bithynia prespensis
- Bithynia skadarskii
- Bithynia zeta
- Funduella incisa
- Gabbiella humerosa alberti
- Gabbiella humerosa edwardi
- Gabbiella spiralis
- Gabbiella tchadiensis
- Gabbiella verdcourti
- Liminitesta sulcata
- Pseudobithynia levantica
- Pseudobithynia trichonis

===== Cochliopidae =====
- Heleobia foxianensis
- Tryonia diaboli

===== Hydrobiidae =====
- Alzoniella asturica
- Alzoniella delmastroi
- Alzoniella edmundi
- Alzoniella finalina
- Antrobia culveri
- Beddomeia capensis
- Beddomeia fallax
- Belgrandia conoidea
- Belgrandia lusitanica
- Belgrandiella adsharica
- Belgrandiella aulaei
- Belgrandiella wawrai
- Boetersiella sturmi
- Bracenica spiridoni
- Bythinella bavarica
- Bythinella carinulata
- Bythinella viridis
- Bythinella zyvionteki
- Bythiospeum bormanni
- Bythiospeum clessini
- Bythiospeum elseri
- Bythiospeum klemmi
- Bythiospeum labiatum
- Bythiospeum lamperti
- Bythiospeum nocki
- Bythiospeum noricum
- Bythiospeum sterkianum
- Bythiospeum taxisi
- Daphniola exigua
- Falsipyrgula barroisi
- Falsipyrgula pfeiferi
- Fonscochlea aquatica
- Fonscochlea billakalina
- Giustia bodoni
- Giustia gofasi
- Giustia janai
- Giustia midarensis
- Graecoanatolica dinarica
- Graecoanatolica lacustristurca
- Graecoanatolica pamphylica
- Graecoanatolica tenuis
- Graziana cezairensis
- Graziana klagenfurtensis
- Graziana provincialis
- Graziana trinitatis
- Hadopyrgus anops
- Hadopyrgus brevis
- Hauffenia jadertina
- Hauffenia kerschneri
- Hauffenia nesemanni
- Hauffenia wienerwaldensis
- Heideella knidirii
- Heideella sp. nov. 'salahi'
- Hemistomia pusillior
- Heterocyclus perroquini
- Heterocyclus petiti
- Horatia sp. nov. 'aghbalensis'
- Horatia sp. nov. 'haasei'
- Hydrobia guyenoti
- Hydrobia maroccana
- Hydrobia plena
- Hydrobia schoutedeni
- Iglica bagliviaeformis
- Islamia henrici
- Islamia pallida
- Jardinella acuminata
- Jardinella exigua
- Jardinella jesswiseae
- Jardinella pallida
- Jardinella zeidlerorum
- Leiorhagium montfaouense
- Leiorhagium ruali
- Leptopyrgus manneringi
- Lyhnidia gjorgjevici
- Maroccopsis agadirensis
- Marstonia agarhecta
- Mercuria meridionalis
- Mercuria vindilica
- Meridiopyrgus murihiku
- Moominia willii
- Narentiana vjetrenicae
- Ohridohauffenia depressa
- Ohridohauffenia rotonda
- Ohridohauffenia sanctinaumi
- Ohridohoratia carinata
- Ohrigocea karevi
- Ohrigocea miladinovorum
- Ohrigocea ornata
- Ohrigocea samuili
- Ohrigocea stankovici
- Parabythinella macedonica
- Paxillostium nanum
- Pezzolia radapalladis
- Plagigeyeria deformata
- Plagigeyeria zetaprotogona
- Pseudamnicola geldiayana
- Pseudamnicola lucensis
- Pseudamnicola solitaria
- Pyrgohydrobia prespaensis
- Pyrgulopsis aloba
- Pyrgulopsis bernardina
- Pyrgulopsis cruciglans
- Pyrgulopsis metcalfi
- Salenthydrobia ferrerii
- Sardohoratia islamioides
- Saxurinator montenegrinus
- Saxurinator sketi
- Spathogyna fezi
- Tarraconia rolani
- Tongapyrgus subterraneus
- Trochidrobia inflata
- Vinodolia fiumana
- Vinodolia fluviatilis
- Vinodolia gluhodolica
- Vinodolia scutarica

===== Littorinidae =====
- Cremnoconchus carinatus
- Cremnoconchus syhadrensis

===== Moitessieriidae =====
- Paladilhia gloeeri
- Spiralix valenciana

===== Pomatiidae =====
- Tropidophora articulata
- Tropidophora deburghiae
- Tropidophora gardineri

===== Pomatiopsidae =====
- Fenouilia kreitneri
- Pachydrobia zilchi
- Tomichia differens
- Tomichia ventricosa
- Tomichia zwellendamensis

===== Stenothyridae =====
- Stenothyra huaimoi

==== Neogastropoda ====
===== Conidae =====
- Conus ateralbus
- Conus belairensis
- Conus bruguieresi
- Conus cloveri
- Conus crotchii
- Conus cuneolus
- Conus echinophilus
- Conus fernandesi
- Conus hybridus
- Conus mercator
- Conus unifasciatus

==== Sorbeoconcha ====
===== Melanopsidae =====
- Melanopsis dircaena
- Melanopsis etrusca
- Melanopsis letourneuxi
- Melanopsis magnifica
- Melanopsis mourebeyensis
- Melanopsis scalaris

===== Pachychilidae =====
- Brotia pageli
- Madagasikara johnsoni
- Madagasikara madagascarensis
- Madagasikara vazimba
- Madagasikara vivipara
- Potadoma angulata
- Potadoma nyongensis
- Potadoma ponthiervillensis
- Potadoma trochiformis
- Potadoma zenkeri

===== Paludomidae =====
- Bathanalia howesi
- Cleopatra athiensis
- Cleopatra mweruensis
- Cleopatra pilula
- Cleopatra rugosa
- Hirthia littorina
- Paludomus ajanensis
- Paludomus messageri
- Potadomoides pelseneeri
- Pseudocleopatra bennikei

===== Pleuroceridae =====
- Elimia bellula
- Io fluvialis
- Leptoxis taeniata
- Pleurocera foremani

===== Semisulcospiridae =====
- Juga hemphilli
- Juga occata

===== Thiaridae =====
- Melanoides crawshayi
- Melanoides kinshassaensis
- Melanoides wagenia
- Semisulcospira morii

==== Stylommatophora ====
===== Acavidae =====
- Ampelita fulgurata
- Ampelita julii
- Stylodonta studeriana

===== Achatinellidae =====
- Elasmias ovatulum
- Newcombia canaliculata
- Newcombia cumingi
- Newcombia lirata
- Newcombia perkinsi
- Newcombia pfeifferi
- Newcombia sulcata
- Partulina mighelsiana
- Partulina perdix
- Partulina physa
- Partulina proxima
- Partulina redfieldi
- Partulina semicarinata
- Partulina splendida
- Partulina tappaniana
- Partulina tessellata
- Partulina variabilis
- Perdicella helena

===== Amastridae =====
- Leptachatina lepida

===== Ariophantidae =====
- Macrochlamys sp. nov. 'White, umbilicate'
- Microcystina sp. nov. 'Kien Luong'

===== Athoracophoridae =====
- Triboniophorus sp. nov. 'Kaputar'

===== Camaenidae =====
- Amplirhagada astuta
- Amplirhagada questroana
- Cristilabrum bubulum
- Cristilabrum buryillum
- Cristilabrum grossum
- Cristilabrum solitudum
- Cupedora evandaleana
- Damochlora millepunctata
- Glyptorhagada silveri
- Kimboraga exanima
- Meridolum corneovirens
- Nanotrachia orientalis
- Thersites mitchellae

===== Cerastidae =====
- Pachnodus becketti
- Pachnodus fregatensis
- Pachnodus kantilali
- Pachnodus niger
- Pachnodus ornatus

===== Charopidae =====
- Ba humbugi
- Orangia cookei
- Orangia sporadica
- Pilula mahesiana
- Ptychodon schuppi
- Radioconus riochcoensis
- Radiodiscus amdenus
- Semperdon uncatus
- Sinployea princei
- Sinployea rotumana
- Trachycystis haygarthi

===== Chlamydephoridae =====
- Chlamydephorus purcelli

===== Clausiliidae =====
- Albinaria torticollis
- Boettgeria crispa
- Carinigera lophauchena
- Carinigera pellucida
- Carinigera pharsalica
- Charpentieria eminens
- Charpentieria grohmanniana
- Charpentieria leucophryna
- Charpentieria nobilis
- Lampedusa imitatrix

===== Cochlicellidae =====
- Obelus discogranulatus

===== Cochlicopidae =====
- Cryptazeca kobelti
- Cryptazeca monodonta

===== Endodontidae =====
- Aaadonta constricta
- Aaadonta fuscozonata
- Hirasea acutissima
- Hirasea chichijimana
- Hirasea diplomphalus
- Hirasea insignis
- Hirasea operculina
- Thaumatodon hystricelloides
- Thaumatodon subdaedalea

===== Enidae =====
- Brephulopsis subulata
- Napaeus doliolum
- Napaeus myosotis
- Napaeus nanodes

===== Euconulidae =====
- Ctenophila caldwelli
- Ctenophila setiliris
- Dancea rodriguezensis
- Dupontia perlucida
- Hacrochlamys lineolatus
- Lamprocystis hahajimana

===== Ferussaciidae =====
- Amphorella tuberculata

===== Helicarionidae =====
- Advena charon
- Dolapex amiculus
- Erepta odontina
- Kaliella aldabra
- Lutilodix imitratrix
- Mathewsoconcha belli

===== Helicidae =====
- Arianta chamaeleon
- Codringtonia codringtonii
- Cornu mazzullii
- Helix godetiana
- Helix texta
- Helix valentini
- Hemicycla fuenterroquensis
- Hemicycla pouchadan
- Iberus gualtieranus
- Lampadia webbiana
- Marmorana nebrodensis
- Tacheocampylaea acropachia
- Tacheocampylaea cyrniaca
- Tacheocampylaea tacheoides
- Theba grasseti

===== Helicodontidae =====
- Helicodonta wilhelminae

===== Helminthoglyptidae =====
- Helminthoglypta callistoderma

===== Hygromiidae =====
- Actinella carinofausta
- Canariella eutropis
- Canariella huttereri
- Candidula grovesiana
- Candidula setubalensis
- Caseolus calvus
- Cernuella rugosa
- Discula pulvinata
- Discula tectiformis
- Geomitra moniziana
- Geomitra tiarella
- Geomitra watsoni
- Helicella stiparum
- Hystricella echinulata
- Leptaxis caldeirarum
- Leptaxis minor
- Leptaxis wollastoni
- Monacha auturica
- Pyrenaearia organiaca
- Serratorotula coronata
- Trochulus biconicus
- Xerocrassa edmundi
- Xerocrassa montserratensis
- Xerocrassa moraguesi
- Xerosecta adolfi
- Xerotricha gasulli
- Xerotricha pavida

===== Lauriidae =====
- Leiostyla concinna
- Leiostyla falknerorum

===== Limacidae =====
- Malacolimax wiktori

===== Orculidae =====
- Orculella aragonica

===== Orthalicidae =====
- Boninena callistoderma
- Boninena hiraseana
- Boninena ogasawarae
- Bothriembryon perobesus
- Bothriembryon praecelcus
- Bulimulus cinerarius
- Bulimulus cucullinus
- Bulimulus nux
- Bulimulus olla
- Bulimulus perspectivus
- Bulimulus planospira
- Bulimulus rugulosus
- Orthalicus reses reses
- Placostylus graeffei
- Placostylus guanensis
- Placostylus hoyti
- Placostylus kantavuensis
- Placostylus ochrostoma
- Placostylus seemanni

===== Oxychilidae =====
- Oxychilus aegopinoides
- Oxychilus basajauna
- Oxychilus fuscosus
- Oxychilus pilula
- Retinella osoriensis

===== Parmacellidae =====
- Drusia tenerifensis

===== Partulidae =====
- Eua zebrina
- Palaopartula thetis
- Partula auraniana
- Samoana conica
- Samoana diaphana
- Samoana thurstoni

===== Polygyridae =====
- Mesodon clenchi

===== Pristilomatidae =====
- Vermetum tamadabaensis
- Vitrea nadejdae
- Vitrea spelaea
- Vitrea zilchi

===== Rhytididae =====
- Occirhenea georgiana
- Ouagapia perryi
- Victaphanta compacta

===== Sphincterochilidae =====
- Sphincterochila insularis

===== Streptaxidae =====
- Careoradula perelegans
- Edentulina moreleti
- Glabrennea gardineri
- Gonospira deshayesi
- Gonospira uvula
- Gulella antelmeana
- Gulella aprosdoketa
- Gulella claustralis
- Gulella taitensis
- Imperturbatia constans
- Imperturbatia violescens
- Microstrophia modesta
- Tayloria urguessensis subangulata

===== Strophocheilidae =====
- Megalobulimus fragilion
- Megalobulimus lopesi
- Megalobulimus parafragilior

===== Subulinidae =====
- Euonyma curtissima
- Subuliniscus arambourgi

===== Succineidae =====
- Quickia aldabrensis
- Succinea piratarum
- Succinea quadrasi

===== Trochomorphidae =====
- Videna oleacina

===== Urocyclidae =====
- Thapsia buraensis
- Thapsia snelli

===== Valloniidae =====
- Vallonia suevica

===== Vertiginidae =====
- Truncatellina arcyensis
- Vertigo heldi

===== Vitrinidae =====
- Eucobresia pegorarii

===== Zonitidae =====
- Doraegopis boeoticus
- Trochomorpha albostriata
- Trochomorpha apia
- Trochomorpha tavinniensis
- Trochomorpha transarata
- Zonites euboeicus
- Zonites graecus
- Zonites kobelti
- Zonites labiosus
- Zonites messenicus
- Zonites oertzeni

==== Systellommatophora ====
===== Veronicellidae =====
- Laevicaulis haroldi

==== Vetigastropoda ====
===== Haliotidae =====
- Haliotis kamtschatkana

== Nemertina ==
=== Enopla ===
==== Hoplonemertea ====
===== Prosorhochmidae =====
- Antiponemertes allisonae

== Onychophora ==
=== Onychophora ===
==== Onychophora ====
===== Peripatidae =====
- Macroperipatus insularis

===== Peripatopsidae =====
- Tasmanipatus anophthalmus
