= List of non-marine molluscs of Madagascar =

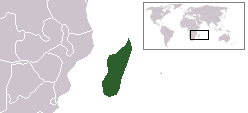
Location of Madagascar

The non-marine molluscs of Madagascar are a part of the molluscan fauna of Madagascar (wildlife of Madagascar).

In tropical rainforests of Madagascar, there is high diversity of species of terrestrial gastropods and many species has low population density, so many of them are "extremely rare".

About 50% of land snails in Madagascar are related to land snails in Africa.

== Freshwater gastropods ==
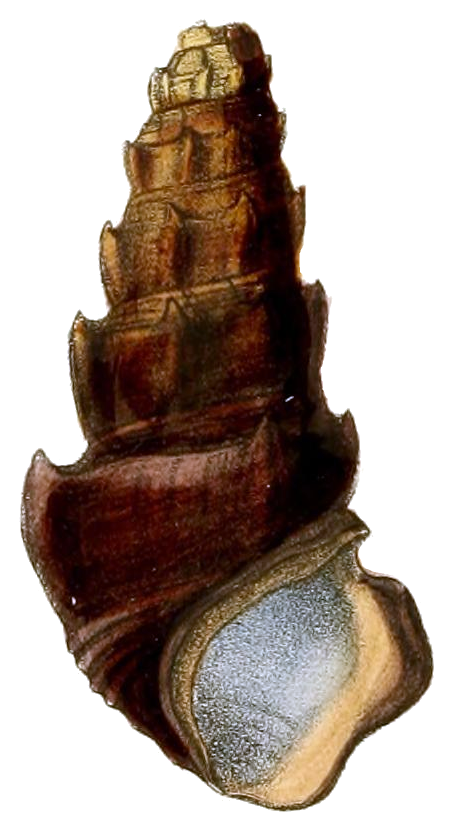
drawing of apertural view of a shell of Madagasikara spinosa

Pachychilidae

the genus Madagasikara is endemic to Madagascar, 5 species

- Madagasikara spinosa (Lamarck, 1822) – the previously used name Melanatria fluminea being not valid, endemic
- Madagasikara madagascariensis (Grateloup, 1840) – endemic
- Madagasikara johnsoni (E. A. Smith, 1882) – endemic
- Madagasikara vivipara Köhler & Glaubrecht, 2010 – endemic
- Madagasikara zazavavindrano Köhler & Glaubrecht, 2010 – endemic
- Madagasikara vazimba Köhler & Glaubrecht, 2010 – endemic

Planorbidae

- Bulinus bavayi Dautzenberg, 1894 – endemic
- Bulinus forskalii (Ehrenberg, 1831) – introduced
- Bulinus liratus Tristram, 1863 – endemic
- Bulinus obtusispira (E. A. Smith, 1882) – endemic
- Biomphalaria pfeifferi (Krauss, 1848)
- Afrogyrorbis natalensis (Krauss, 1848) – previously named Ceratophallus natalensis
- Pettancylus modestus (Crosse, 1880) – previously named Ferrissia modesta, endemic
- Hovorbis crassilabrum (Morelet, 1860) – previously named Africanogyrus crassilabrum, endemic
- Lentorbis junodi (Connolly, 1922)
- Segmentorbis angustus (Jickeli, 1874)
- Gyraulus mauritianus (Morelet, 1876) – endemic to the Mascarene island Mauritius, possibly introduced to Madagascar

Lymnaeidae

- Radix natalensis (Krauss, 1848)
- Lantzia carinata (Jousseaume, 1872) – endemic to the Mascarene island Réunion

Ampullariidae

- Lanistes grasseti (Morelet, 1863) – endemic
- Pila cecillei (R. A. Philippi, 1849) – endemic

Paludomidae

- Cleopatra colbeaui (Craven, 1880) – endemic
- Cleopatra grandidieri (Crosse & P. Fischer, 1872) – endemic
- Cleopatra madagascariensis (Crosse & P. Fischer, 1872) – endemic

Thiaridae

- Melanoides psorica (Morelet, 1864) – endemic
- Melanoides tuberculata (O. F. Müller, 1774)
- Mieniplotia scabra (O. F. Müller, 1774)
- Thiara amarula (Linnaeus, 1758)

== Land gastropods ==
Megalomastomatidae

- Acroptychia mahafinaritra Emberton, Slapcinsky, Campbell, Rakotondrazafy, Andriamiarison & Emberton, 2010
- Acroptychia bathiei Fischer-Piette & Bedoucha, 1965

Cyclophoridae

the genus Boucardicus is endemic to Madagascar, consist 199 species and 5 subspecies

- Boucardicus acutapex Emberton, 2002
- Boucardicus aforitrus Emberton, 2002
- Boucardicus alarus Emberton, 2002
- Boucardicus albocinctus (Smith, 1893)
- Boucardicus ambalaniranae Emberton, 2002
- Boucardicus ambanianae Emberton, 2002
- Boucardicus ambatolahyi Emberton, 2002
- Boucardicus ambatovakiae Emberton, 2002
- Boucardicus ambindaensis Balashov & Griffiths, 2015
- Boucardicus amboinus Emberton, 2002
- Boucardicus ambrensis Emberton, 2002
- Boucardicus ampanefenae Emberton, 2002
- Boucardicus analamerae Emberton, 2002
- Boucardicus andavakoerae Emberton, 2002
- Boucardicus andohahelae Emberton, 2002
- Boucardicus andringitrae Ficher-Piette, Blanc, Blanc & Salvat, 1993
- Boucardicus angavokelensis Fischer-Piette, F. Blanc & Vukadinovic, 1974
- Boucardicus anjanaharibei Emberton, 2002
- Boucardicus anjarae Emberton, Slapcinsky, Campbell, Rakotondrazafy, Andriamiarison & Emberton, 2010
- Boucardicus antiquus Emberton & Pearce, 1999
- Boucardicus avo Emberton, Slapcinsky, Campbell, Rakotondrazafy, Andriamiarison & Emberton, 2010
- Boucardicus beampingaratrae Emberton, 2002
- Boucardicus beananae Fischer-Piette & Bedoucha, 1965
- Boucardicus bedintae Emberton, 2002
- Boucardicus beloakus Emberton, 2002
- Boucardicus bemarahae Emberton, 2002
  - Boucardicus bemarahae turbanus Emberton, 2002
- Boucardicus betamponae Emberton, 2002
- Boucardicus betsiakensis Emberton, 2002
- Boucardicus bevavus Emberton, 2002
- Boucardicus bidens Emberton, 2002
- Boucardicus boucheti Fischer-Piette, Blanc, Blanc & Salvat, 1993
- Boucardicus boulangeri Fischer-Piette, Blanc, Blanc & Salvat, 1993
- Boucardicus cadlei Emberton, 2002
- Boucardicus capsaintemariae Emberton, 2002
- Boucardicus carilockneyae Emberton, 2002
- Boucardicus carylae Emberton & Pearce, 1999
- Boucardicus castaneus Emberton, 2002
- Boucardicus celesti Emberton, 2002
- Boucardicus celestinae Emberton, 2002
- Boucardicus clarae Emberton, 1994
- Boucardicus claudei Emberton, 2002
- Boucardicus coffeus Emberton, 2002
- Boucardicus compactus Emberton, 2002
- Boucardicus corrugatus Emberton, 2002
- Boucardicus costulatus Emberton, 2002
- Boucardicus culminans Fischer-Piette, Blanc, Blanc & Salvat, 1993
- Boucardicus curvifolius Emberton & Pearce, 1999
- Boucardicus darasyi Emberton, 2002
- Boucardicus delicatus Emberton & Pearce, 1999
- Boucardicus distortus Emberton, 2002
- Boucardicus divei Fischer-Piette, Blanc, Blanc & Salvat, 1993
- Boucardicus dominiqui Emberton, 2002
- Boucardicus elegans Emberton, 2002
- Boucardicus esetrae Emberton & Pearce, 1999
- Boucardicus fauri (Fischer-Piette, Blanc, Blanc & Salvat, 1993)
- Boucardicus fidimananai Emberton & Pearce, 1999
- Boucardicus fischerpiettei Emberton, 2002
- Boucardicus florenti Emberton, 2002
- Boucardicus fofifae Emberton, 2002
- Boucardicus fortistriatus Emberton & Pearce, 1999
- Boucardicus fotsivavus Emberton, 2002
- Boucardicus fuscolabrus Emberton, 1994
- Boucardicus gibberosus (Fischer-Piette, Blanc, Blanc & Salvat, 1993)
- Boucardicus globulus Emberton, 2002
- Boucardicus gloriosus Emberton, 2002
- Boucardicus goodmani Emberton, 2002
- Boucardicus goudoti (Fischer-Piette & Bedoucha, 1965)
- Boucardicus gratus Emberton, 2002
- Boucardicus griffithsi Emberton, 2002
- Boucardicus hadgii Fischer-Piette, Blanc, Blanc & Salvat, 1993
- Boucardicus hafahafus Emberton, 2002
- Boucardicus hamafasinus Emberton, 2002
- Boucardicus harananae Emberton, 1994
- Boucardicus hautspiralus Emberton, 2002
- Boucardicus hetra Emberton, Slapcinsky, Campbell, Rakotondrazafy, Andriamiarison & Emberton, 2010
- Boucardicus hitus Emberton, 2002
- Boucardicus inconspicuus Emberton, 2002
- Boucardicus inornatus Emberton, 2002
- Boucardicus josephinae Emberton, 2002
- Boucardicus kanto Emberton, 2002
- Boucardicus kianjavatoae Emberton, 2002
- Boucardicus kikarivoi Emberton, 2002
- Boucardicus kremenae Emberton, 2002
- Boucardicus kristalius Emberton, 2002
- Boucardicus kylei (Emberton, 1994)
- Boucardicus lalinify Emberton, Slapcinsky, Campbell, Rakotondrazafy, Andriamiarison & Emberton, 2010
- Boucardicus lalitrus Emberton, 2002
- Boucardicus laoranjus Emberton, 2002
- Boucardicus lavakelius Emberton, 2002
- Boucardicus lavalavus Emberton, 2002
  - Boucardicus lavalavus andaitrae Emberton, 2002
  - Boucardicus lavalavus toilavalavus Emberton, 2002
  - Boucardicus lavalavus zobikeliae Emberton, 2002
- Boucardicus lelus Emberton, 2002
- Boucardicus leopardus Emberton, 2002
- Boucardicus littoralis Emberton, 2002
- Boucardicus luciae Emberton, 1994
- Boucardicus mageti Fischer-Piette, Blanc, Blanc & Salvat, 1993
- Boucardicus magnilobatus Emberton & Pearce, 1999
- Boucardicus mahafinaritrus Emberton, 2002
- Boucardicus mahalevonae Emberton, 2002
- Boucardicus mahavariana Emberton, Slapcinsky, Campbell, Rakotondrazafy, Andriamiarison & Emberton, 2010
- Boucardicus mahermanae Emberton & Pearce, 1999
- Boucardicus malemius Emberton, 2002
- Boucardicus malotus Emberton, 2002
- Boucardicus mamirapiratrus Emberton, 2002
- Boucardicus mananarae Emberton, 2002
- Boucardicus manantenus Emberton, 2002
- Boucardicus mandenae Emberton, 2002
- Boucardicus manjakely Emberton, 2002
- Boucardicus manomboensis Emberton, 2002
- Boucardicus manomponae Emberton, 2002
- Boucardicus marojejiae Emberton, 2002
- Boucardicus maronifius Emberton, 2002
- Boucardicus matoatoa Emberton, Slapcinsky, Campbell, Rakotondrazafy, Andriamiarison & Emberton, 2010
- Boucardicus mavokely Emberton, 2002
- Boucardicus menoi Emberton, Slapcinsky, Campbell, Rakotondrazafy, Andriamiarison & Emberton, 2010
- Boucardicus meyersi Emberton, 2002
- Boucardicus michellae Emberton, 2002
- Boucardicus microlavalavus Emberton, 2002
- Boucardicus microtridentatus Emberton, 2002
- Boucardicus mihomehius Emberton, 2002
- Boucardicus mijerius Emberton, 2002
- Boucardicus milloti Fischer-Piette & Bedoucha, 1965
- Boucardicus minicompactus Emberton, 2002
- Boucardicus minisimplex Emberton, 2002
- Boucardicus minutus Emberton, 2002
- Boucardicus mitovytovylavalavus Emberton, 2002
- Boucardicus monchenkoi Balashov & Griffiths, 2015
- Boucardicus moronarous Emberton, 2002
- Boucardicus nanus Fischer-Piette & Bedoucha, 1965
- Boucardicus nifimenius Emberton, 2002
- Boucardicus nifius Emberton, 2002
- Boucardicus nosymangabei Emberton, 2002
- Boucardicus notabilis (Smith, 1892)
- Boucardicus onjus Emberton, 2002
- Boucardicus optio Fischer-Piette, Blanc, Blanc & Salvat, 1993
- Boucardicus pachychilus Emberton, 1994
- Boucardicus paradelicatus Emberton, 2002
- Boucardicus parantiquus Emberton, 2002
- Boucardicus paratridentatus Emberton, 2002
- Boucardicus peggyae Emberton, Slapcinsky, Campbell, Rakotondrazafy, Andriamiarison & Emberton, 2010
- Boucardicus pendulus Emberton, 2002
- Boucardicus perineti Emberton, 2002
- Boucardicus petiti Fischer-Piette & Bedoucha, 1965
- Boucardicus pseudocompactus Emberton, 2002
- Boucardicus pseudogastrocoptus Emberton, 2002
- Boucardicus pseudomphalotropis Emberton, 2002
- Boucardicus pulchellus Emberton, Slapcinsky, Campbell, Rakotondrazafy, Andriamiarison & Emberton, 2010
- Boucardicus pupillidentatus Emberton, 2002
- Boucardicus pupisomus Emberton, 1994
- Boucardicus rakotoarisoni Emberton & Pearce, 1999
- Boucardicus randalanai Emberton & Pearce, 1999
- Boucardicus ranomafanae Emberton, 1994
- Boucardicus regularis Emberton, 2002
- Boucardicus reservei Emberton, 2002
- Boucardicus reticulatus Emberton, 2002
- Boucardicus roamolotrus Emberton, 2002
- Boucardicus ronae Emberton, 2002
- Boucardicus ruthae Emberton, 2002
- Boucardicus sahasoae Emberton, 2002
- Boucardicus sahavondrononae Emberton, 2002
- Boucardicus saintemariae Emberton, 2002
- Boucardicus saintjacqui Emberton, 2002
- Boucardicus saintlouisi Emberton, 2002
- Boucardicus sculptus Emberton, 2002
- Boucardicus seguini Fischer-Piette, Blanc, Blanc & Salvat, 1993
- Boucardicus simplex Emberton & Pearce, 1999
- Boucardicus solidus Emberton, 2002
- Boucardicus soulaianus Fischer-Piette, Blanc, Blanc & Salvat, 1993
- Boucardicus streptaxis Emberton, 2002
- Boucardicus striatus Emberton, 2002
- Boucardicus tandrimus Emberton, 2002
- Boucardicus tantelyae Emberton, Slapcinsky, Campbell, Rakotondrazafy, Andriamiarison & Emberton, 2010
- Boucardicus timpearcei Emberton, 2002
- Boucardicus tolagnaroi Emberton, 2002
- Boucardicus trafous Emberton, 2002
- Boucardicus triangulus Emberton, 2002
- Boucardicus tridentatus Emberton & Pearce, 1999
- Boucardicus trompettus Emberton, 2002
- Boucardicus tsarabeus Emberton, 2002
- Boucardicus tsaratananae Emberton, 2002
- Boucardicus tsingyi Emberton, 2002
- Boucardicus vagneri Fischer-Piette, Blanc, Blanc & Salvat, 1993
  - Boucardicus vagneri galokoae Emberton, 2002
  - Boucardicus vagneri tsaratae Emberton, 2002
- Boucardicus vavabitikus Emberton, 2002
- Boucardicus victorhernandezi Emberton 1998
- Boucardicus villae (Fischer-Piette, Blanc, Blanc & Salvat, 1993)
- Boucardicus vincenti Emberton, 2002
- Boucardicus volamenus Emberton, 2002
- Boucardicus volous Emberton, 2002
- Boucardicus zebreus Emberton, 2002
- Cyathopoma anjombona Emberton, Slapcinsky, Campbell, Rakotondrazafy, Andriamiarison & Emberton, 2010
- Cyathopoma hoditra Emberton, Slapcinsky, Campbell, Rakotondrazafy, Andriamiarison & Emberton, 2010
- Cyathopoma iridescens Emberton, Slapcinsky, Campbell, Rakotondrazafy, Andriamiarison & Emberton, 2010
- Cyathopoma madio Emberton, Slapcinsky, Campbell, Rakotondrazafy, Andriamiarison & Emberton, 2010
- Cyathopoma matsoko Emberton, Slapcinsky, Campbell, Rakotondrazafy, Andriamiarison & Emberton, 2010
- Cyclotus (Millotorbis) ankaranae Emberton, 2004
- Cyclotus bemarahae Emberton, 2004
- Cyclotus gallorum Emberton, 2004
- Cyclotus griffithsi Emberton, 2004
- Cyclotus mamillaris Odhner, 1919
- Cyclotus micromamillaris Emberton, 2004
- Cyclotus (Millotorbis) milloti Fischer-Piette & Bedoucha, 1965
- Cyclotus namorokae Emberton, 2004

Assimineidae

- Omphalotropis angulata Emberton, 2004
- Omphalotropis betamponae Emberton, 2004
- Omphalotropis bevohimenae Emberton, 2004
- Omphalotropis capdambrae Emberton, 2004
- Omphalotropis castelli Fischer-Piette, Blanc, Blanc & Salvat, 1993
- Omphalotropis costulata Emberton & Pearce, 1999
- Omphalotropis fortis Emberton, 2004
- Omphalotropis galokoae Emberton, 2004
- Omphalotropis griffithsi Emberton, 2004
- Omphalotropis madagascariensis Germain, 1921
- Omphalotropis manomboae Emberton, 2004
- Omphalotropis tantelia Emberton, 2004
- Omphalotropis vohimenae Emberton & Pearce, 1999

Hydrocenidae

- Georissa ampla Emberton, 2004
- Georissa ankaranae Emberton, 2004
- Georissa aurata (Odhner, 1919)
- Georissa capdambrae Emberton, 2004
- Georissa detrita Bavay & Germain, 1920
- Georissa froli Fischer-Piette, Blanc, Blanc & Salvat, 1993
- Georissa krantz Fischer-Piette, Blanc, Blanc & Salvat, 1993
- Georissa maraoraoa Emberton, 2004
- Georissa petiti Germain, 1935
- Georissa saintemariae Emberton, 2004
- Georissa verreti Fischer-Piette, Blanc, Blanc & Salvat, 1993

Pomatiidae

- Tropidophora humbug Griffiths & Herbert, 2013
- Tropidophora sericea Griffiths & Herbert, 2013

Veronicellidae

- a veronicellid sp. or spp.

Orculidae

- Fauxulus josephinae Emberton & Griffiths, 2009
- Fauxulus tsarakely Emberton, Slapcinsky, Campbell, Rakotondrazafy, Andriamiarison & Emberton, 2010

Succineidae

- Succinea masoala Emberton & Griffiths, 2009

Subulinidae

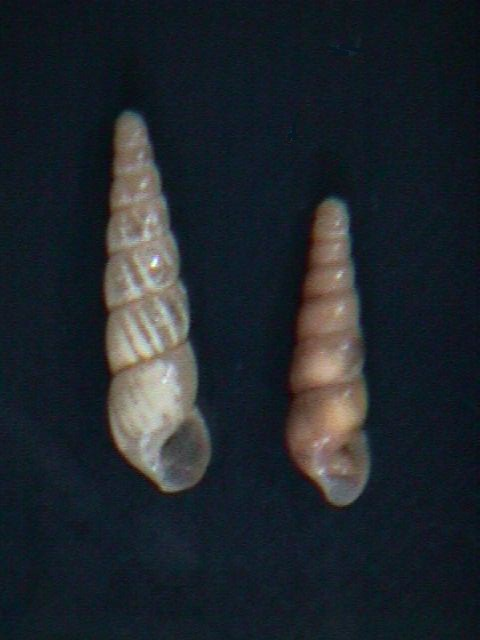
Subulina octona

- Allopeas sp. 1 sensu Emberton & Griffiths (2009)
- Allopeas sp. 2 sensu Emberton & Griffiths (2009)
- Curvella poutiersi Fischer-Piette, Blanc, Blanc & Salvat, 1994
- Pseudopeas cf. valentini Fischer-Piette, Blanc, Blanc & Salvat, 1994
- Subulina mamillata (Craven, 1880)
- Subulina octona (Bruguière, 1792)

Cerastidae

- Conulinus randalanai Griffiths & Herbert, 2013

Achatinidae

- Achatina fulica Bowdich, 1822
- Achatina immaculata Lamarck, 1822

Streptaxidae

- Fischerpietteus josephinae Emberton & Griffiths, 2009
- Gulella ambodipelomosiae Emberton, 2002
- Gulella andriantanteliae Emberton, Slapcinsky, Campbell, Rakotondrazafy, Andriamiarison & Emberton, 2010
- Gulella beandreana Emberton, 2001
- Gulella betamponae Emberton, 2002
- Gulella kelimolotra Emberton, 2002
- Gulella kendrae Emberton & Griffiths, 2009
- Gulella laninifia Emberton, 2002
- Gulella lincolni Emberton & Griffiths, 2009
- Gulella matavymolotra Emberton, 2002
- Gulella minuseula Emberton & Pearce, 2000
- Gulella ruthae Emberton, 2002
- Gulella sahia Emberton, 2002
- Gulella soulaiana Fischer-Piette, 1973
- Gulella taolantehezana Emberton, 2002
- Gulella thompsoni Emberton, Slapcinsky, Campbell, Rakotondrazafy, Andriamiarison & Emberton, 2010
- Gulella sp. 1 sensu Emberton & Griffiths (2009)
- Gulella sp. 2 sensu Emberton & Griffiths (2009)
- Gulella sp. 3 sensu Emberton & Griffiths (2009)
- Parvedentulina Emberton & Pearce, 2000 – Parvedentulina are endemic to Madagascar
- Parvedentulina acutapex Emberton & Pearce, 2000
- Parvedentulina ambatomitatoae Emberton, 2002
- Parvedentulina ambatosorotrae Emberton, 2002
- Parvedentulina ambatovakiae Emberton, 2002
- Parvedentulina analamerae Emberton, 2002
- Parvedentulina andapae Emberton, 2002
- Parvedentulina andavakoerae Emberton, 2002
- Parvedentulina andriantanteliae Emberton, Slapcinsky, Campbell, Rakotondrazafy, Andriamiarison & Emberton, 2010
- Parvedentulina andringitrae Emberton, 2002
- Parvedentulina anjanaharibei Emberton, 2002
- Parvedentulina anjansudae Emberton, 2002
- Parvedentulina antsahamadioae Emberton, 2002
- Parvedentulina apieostriata Emberton & Pearce, 2000
- Parvedentulina balambasia Emberton, 2002
- Parvedentulina bemarahae Emberton, 2002
- Parvedentulina benjamini Emberton, Slapcinsky, Campbell, Rakotondrazafy, Andriamiarison & Emberton, 2010
- Parvedentulina betamponae Emberton, 2002
- Parvedentulina betsiakae Emberton, 2002
- Parvedentulina celestinae Emberton, 2002
- Parvedentulina conspicua Emberton, 2002
- Parvedentulina crenulata Emberton, 2002
- Parvedentulina delicata Emberton, 2002
- Parvedentulina densagyra Emberton, 2002
- Parvedentulina devolia Emberton, 2002
- Parvedentulina distincta Emberton, 2002
- Parvedentulina elegans Emberton, 2002
- Parvedentulina esetra Emberton & Pearce, 2000
- Parvedentulina farihiambonia Emberton, 2002
- Parvedentulina fenni Emberton, 2002
- Parvedentulina fortistriata Emberton, 2002
- Parvedentulina fotobohitrae Emberton, 2002
- Parvedentulina fragilis Emberton, 2002
- Parvedentulina fusiforma Emberton, 2002
- Parvedentulina glesi (Fischer-Piette, Blanc, Blanc & Salvat, 1994)
- Parvedentulina gracilis Emberton, 2002
- Parvedentulina hafa Emberton, 2002
- Parvedentulina hatairana Emberton, 2002
- Parvedentulina horonanladia Emberton, 2002
- Parvedentulina jeani Emberton, Slapcinsky, Campbell, Rakotondrazafy, Andriamiarison & Emberton, 2010
- Parvedentulina josephinae Emberton, 2002
- Parvedentulina kelivitsika Emberton, 2002
- Parvedentulina lalina Emberton, 2002
- Parvedentulina macroconspicua Emberton, 2002
- Parvedentulina magna Emberton, 2002
- Parvedentulina mahalevona Emberton, 2002
- Parvedentulina mahialambo-ensis Emberton & Pearce, 2000
- Parvedentulina mahitsia Emberton, 2002
- Parvedentulina malala Emberton, 2002
- Parvedentulina mamirapiratra Emberton, 2002
- Parvedentulina mananarae Emberton, 2002
- Parvedentulina mandenae Emberton, 2002
- Parvedentulina manja Emberton, 2002
- Parvedentulina manomboae Emberton, 2002
- Parvedentulina manomponae Emberton, 2002
- Parvedentulina maranitra Emberton, 2002
- Parvedentulina margostriata Emberton & Pearce, 2000
- Parvedentulina marojejyae Emberton, 2002
- Parvedentulina masoalae Emberton, 2002
- Parvedentulina metula (Crosse, 1881)
- Parvedentulina miaranoniae Emberton, 2002
- Parvedentulina mijanona Emberton, 2002
- Parvedentulina minidistincta Emberton, 2002
- Parvedentulina minutissima Emberton, 2002
- Parvedentulina montana Emberton, 2002
- Parvedentulina morontsiraka Emberton, 2002
- Parvedentulina namoro-kae Emberton, 2002
- Parvedentulina ovatostoma Emberton & Pearce, 2000
- Parvedentulina parva Emberton, 2002
- Parvedentulina pascali Emberton, 2002
- Parvedentulina paulayi Emberton, Slapcinsky, Campbell, Rakotondrazafy, Andriamiarison & Emberton, 2010
- Parvedentulina pearcei Emberton, 2002
- Parvedentulina planapex Emberton, 2002
- Parvedentulina puichella Emberton, 2002
- Parvedentulina pyramida Emberton, 2002
- Parvedentulina ranomafanae Emberton, 2002
- Parvedentulina rantovina Emberton, 2002
- Parvedentulina rapetoa Emberton, 2002
- Parvedentulina ravinamatia Emberton, 2002
- Parvedentulina rogeri Emberton & Pearce, 2000
- Parvedentulina sahantananae Emberton, 2002
- Parvedentulina saintjacqui Emberton, 2002
- Parvedentulina simeni (Fischer-Piette, Blanc, Blanc & Salvat, 1994)
- Parvedentulina simplex Emberton, 2002
- Parvedentulina tendrombohitra Emberton, 2002
- Parvedentulina terakabe Emberton, 2002
- Parvedentulina texieri Emberton, 2002
- Parvedentulina thompsoni Emberton, Slapcinsky, Campbell, Rakotondrazafy, Andriamiarison & Emberton, 2010
- Parvedentulina tsara Emberton, 2002
- Parvedentulina tsaratananae Emberton, 2002
- Parvedentulina tsaravintana Emberton, 2002
- Parvedentulina tsimahialamboensis Emberton, 2002
- Parvedentulina tsingia Emberton, 2002
- Parvedentulina tsipika Emberton, 2002
- Parvedentulina tsisubulina Emberton, 2002
- Parvedentulina tsotra Emberton, 2002
- Parvedentulina unescoae Emberton, 2002
- Parvedentulina vavalava Emberton, 2002
- Parvedentulina vitroni (Fischer-Piette, Blanc, Blanc & Salvat, 1994)
- Parvedentulina vonjena Emberton, 2002

Acavidae

- Ampelita ambatoensis Emberton & Griffiths, 2009
- Ampelita andriamamonjyi Griffiths & Herbert, 2013
- Ampelita beanka Griffiths & Herbert, 2013
- Ampelita julii Fischer-Piette & Garreau, 1965 – Ampelita julii soa Emberton & Griffiths, 2009
- Ampelita lamarei (Pfeiffer, 1853)
- Ampelita owengriffithsi Emberton, Slapcinsky, Campbell, Rakotondrazafy, Andriamiarison & Emberton, 2010
- Helicophanta amphibulima (Férussac, 1839)

Clavatoridae

- Clavator moreleti Crosse & Fischer, 1868
- Clavator eximius Shuttleworth, 1852
- Clavator grandidieri Crosse & P.Fischer, 1868
- Clavator clavator Petit de la Saussaye, 1844
- Clavator masoalae K.C.Emberton, 1999
- Clavator praecox Fischer-Piette & Salvat, 1963
- Clavator bathiei Fischer-Piette & Salvat, 1963
- Clavator griffithsjonesi K.C.Emberton, 1999
- Clavator anteclavator Germain, 1913
- Clavator dingeoni Fischer-Piette, F.Blanc & Salvat, 1975
- Leucotaenius favannii Lamarck, 1822
- Leucotaenius heimburgi Kobelt, 1901
- Leucotaenius procteri G.B.Sowerby Iii, 1895
- Leucotaenius crassilabris J.E.Gray, 1834
- Leucotaenius laevis Fischer-Piette, 1963
- Leucotaenius bathei Fischer-Piette, 1963
- Leucotaenius adami Fischer-Piette, 1963
- Paraclavator moreleti Deshayes, 1851
- Paraclavator obtusatus Gmelin, 1791

Charopidae

- Reticulapex michellae Emberton, Slapcinsky, Campbell, Rakotondrazafy, Andriamiarison & Emberton, 2010

Ariophantidae

- Kalidos gora Emberton, Slapcinsky, Campbell, Rakotondrazafy, Andriamiarison & Emberton, 2010
- Kalidos manotrika Emberton, Slapcinsky, Campbell, Rakotondrazafy, Andriamiarison & Emberton, 2010
- Kalidos manta Emberton, Slapcinsky, Campbell, Rakotondrazafy, Andriamiarison & Emberton, 2010
- Kalidos maryannae Griffiths & Herbert, 2013

Helicarionidae

- Kaliella crandalli Emberton, Slapcinsky, Campbell, Rakotondrazafy, Andriamiarison & Emberton, 2010
- Microcystis albosuturalis Emberton, Slapcinsky, Campbell, Rakotondrazafy, Andriamiarison & Emberton, 2010
- Microcystis fotsifotsy Emberton, Slapcinsky, Campbell, Rakotondrazafy, Andriamiarison & Emberton, 2010
- Microcystis vony Emberton, Slapcinsky, Campbell, Rakotondrazafy, Andriamiarison & Emberton, 2010
- Sitala burchi Emberton, Slapcinsky, Campbell, Rakotondrazafy, Andriamiarison & Emberton, 2010
- Sitala mavo Emberton, Slapcinsky, Campbell, Rakotondrazafy, Andriamiarison & Emberton, 2010
- Sitala stanisici Emberton, Slapcinsky, Campbell, Rakotondrazafy, Andriamiarison & Emberton, 2010

== Freshwater bivalves ==
Sphaeriidae

- Eupera ferruginea (Krauss, 1848)
- Eupera degorteri (Kuiper, 1954) – endemic
- Euglesa casertana (Poli, 1791)
- Euglesa ovampica (Ancey, 1890)
- Euglesa viridaria (Kuiper, 1956)
- Pisidium reticulatum Kuiper, 1966
- Pisidium johnsoni E. A. Smith, 1882 – endemic
- Pisidium betafoense Kuiper, 1953 – endemic

Unionidae

- Coelatura madagascariensis (Sganzin, 1841) – formerly named Unio madagascariensis, extinct
- Coelatura malgachensis (Germain, 1911) – formerly named Unio malgachensis, extinct
- Germainaia geayi (Germain, 1911) – extinct

== See also ==
- List of marine molluscs of Madagascar
- List of non-marine molluscs of Mozambique
- List of non-marine molluscs of Mauritius
- List of non-marine molluscs of Mayotte
