= Pirena (gastropod) =

Scientific classification
- Kingdom: Animalia
- Phylum: Mollusca
- Class: Gastropoda
- Subclass: Caenogastropoda
- Order: incertae sedis
- Family: Pachychilidae
- Genus: Pirena; Lamarck, 1816

Genus of freshwater snails

Pirena is a genus of gastropods belonging to the family Pachychilidae.

The species of this genus are found in Malesia and Africa.

Species:

- Pirena bicarinata (Grateloup, 1840)
- Pirena johnsoni (E.A.Smith, 1882)
- Pirena madagascariensis Lamarck, 1816
- Pirena sinuosa Philippi, 1847
- Pirena vazimba (Köhler & Glaubrecht, 2010)
- Pirena vivipara (Köhler & Glaubrecht, 2010)
- Pirena zazavavindrano (Köhler & Glaubrecht, 2010)
