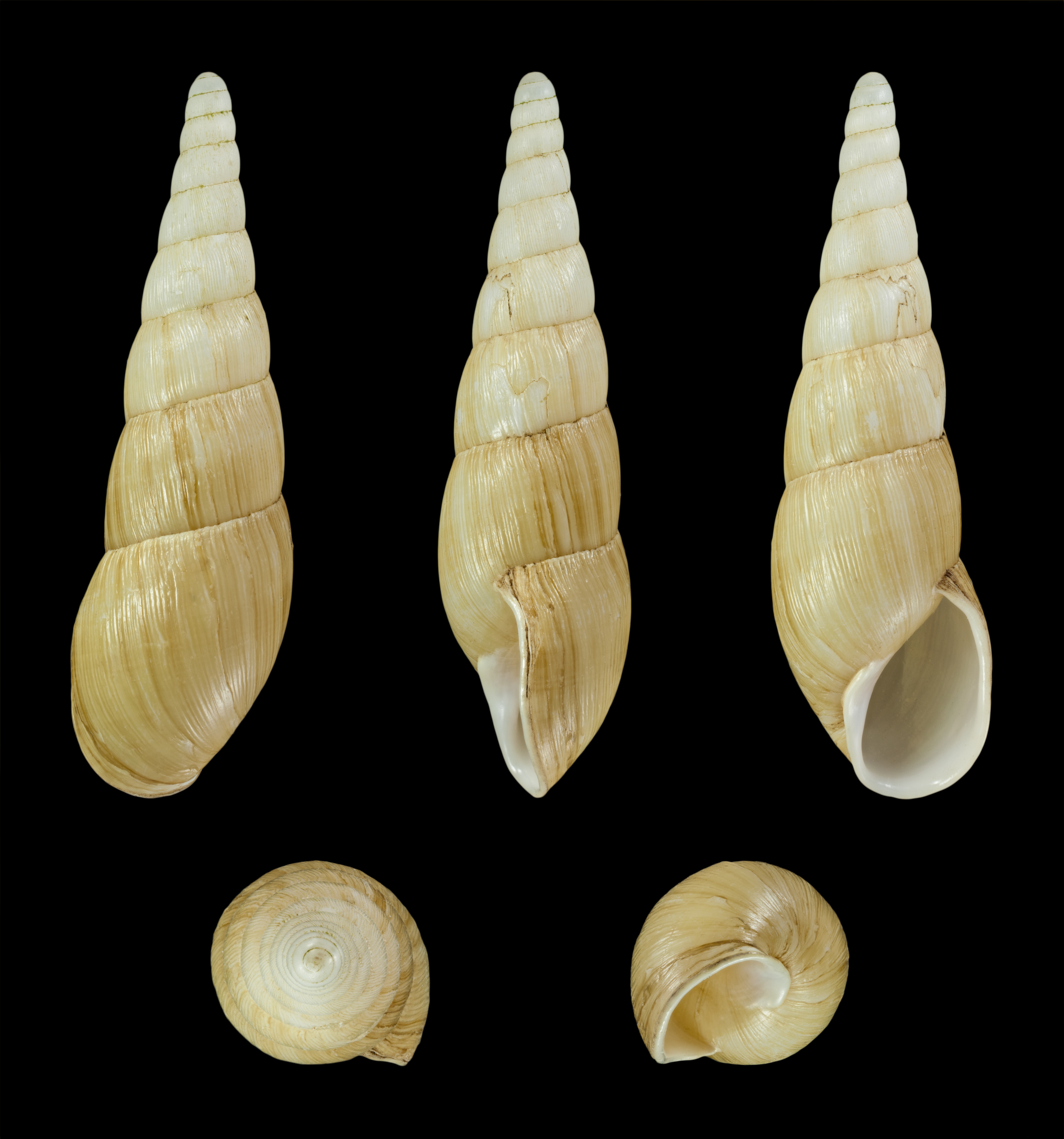

Conservation status
- Vulnerable (IUCN 2.3)

Scientific classification
- Kingdom: Animalia
- Phylum: Mollusca
- Class: Gastropoda
- Order: Stylommatophora
- Family: Clavatoridae
- Genus: Clavator
- Species: C. moreleti

Binomial name
- Clavator moreleti (Deshayes, 1851)

= Clavator moreleti =

Species of gastropod

Clavator moreleti is a species of air-breathing land snail, terrestrial pulmonate gastropod mollusks in the family Clavatoridae.

This species is endemic to Madagascar.
