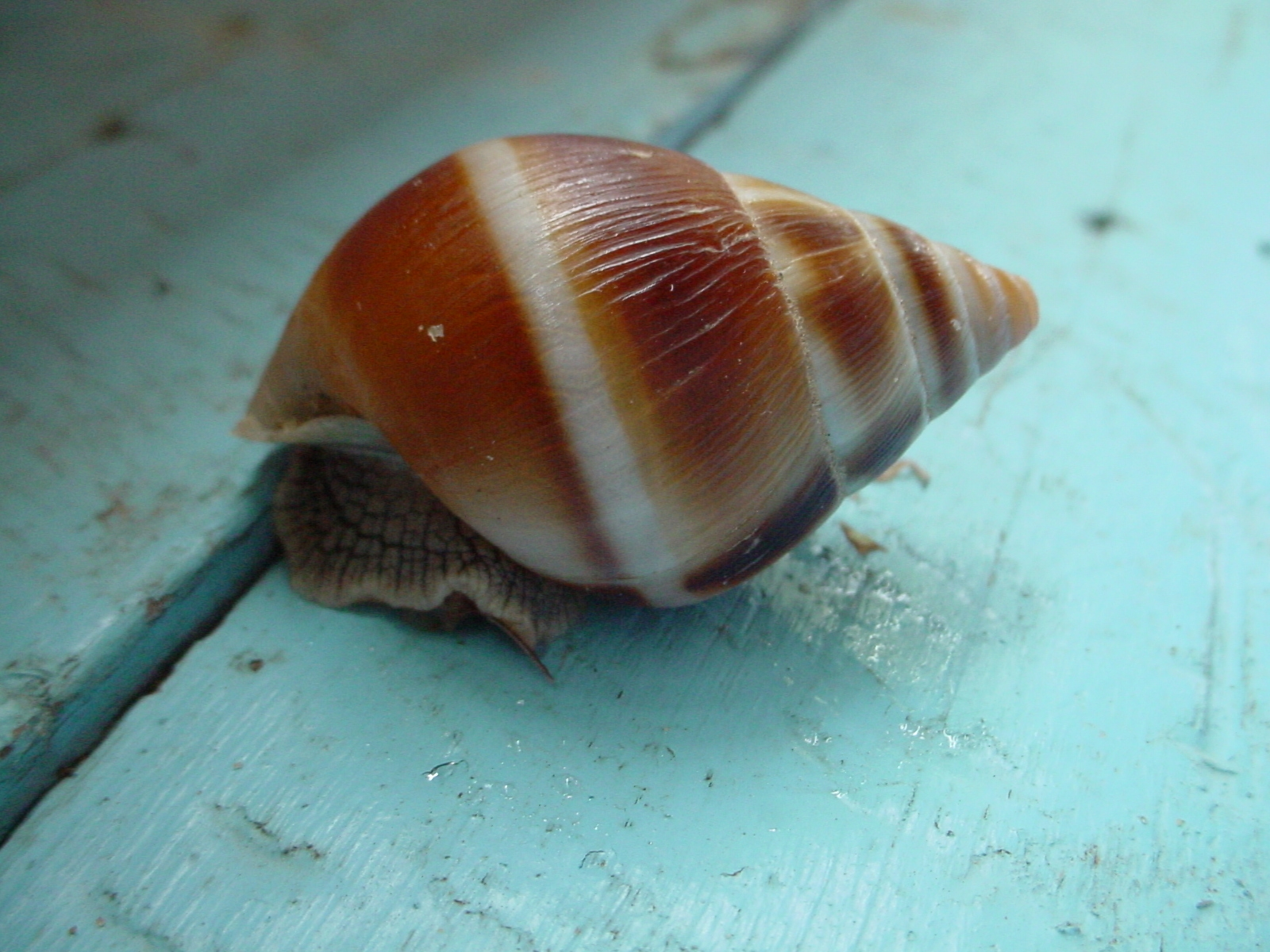
- Leucotaenius favannii

Scientific classification
- Kingdom: Animalia
- Phylum: Mollusca
- Class: Gastropoda
- Order: Stylommatophora
- Family: Clavatoridae
- Genus: Leucotaenius; Martens, 1860

= Leucotaenius =

Genus of gastropods

Leucotaenius is a genus of tropical air-breathing land snails, terrestrial pulmonate gastropod mollusks in the family Clavatoridae.

== Distribution ==
This genus occurs in Madagascar.

== Species ==
Species within this genus Leucotaenius include:

- Leucotaenius adami Fischer-Piette, 1963
- Leucotaenius bathei Fischer-Piette, 1963
- Leucotaenius crassilabris (Gray, 1834)
- Leucotaenius favannii (Lamarck, 1822)
- Leucotaenius heimburgi (Kobelt, 1901)
- Leucotaenius laevis Fischer-Piette, 1963
- Leucotaenius procteri (G. B. Sowerby III, 1895)
