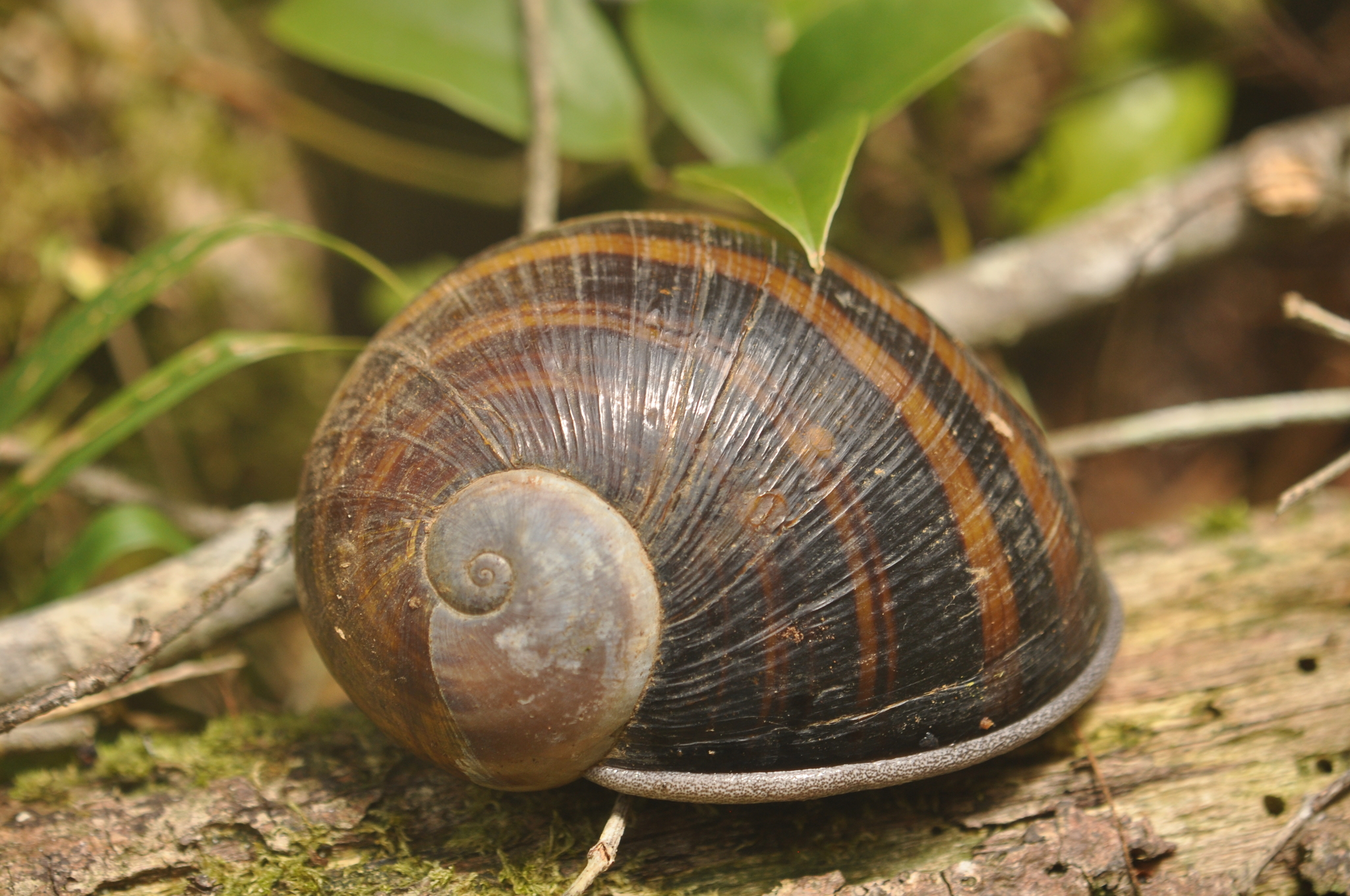

Scientific classification
- Domain: Eukaryota
- Kingdom: Animalia
- Phylum: Mollusca
- Class: Gastropoda
- Order: Stylommatophora
- Family: Acavidae
- Genus: Helicophanta
- Species: H. magnifica

Binomial name
- Helicophanta magnifica (Férussac, 1821)

= Helicophanta magnifica =

Species of gastropod

Helicophanta magnifica, common name the magnificent helicophanta, is a species of air-breathing land snail, a terrestrial pulmonate gastropod mollusc in the family Acavidae. The shell of this species can reach a length of 75–85 mm. The species occurs in Madagascar.
