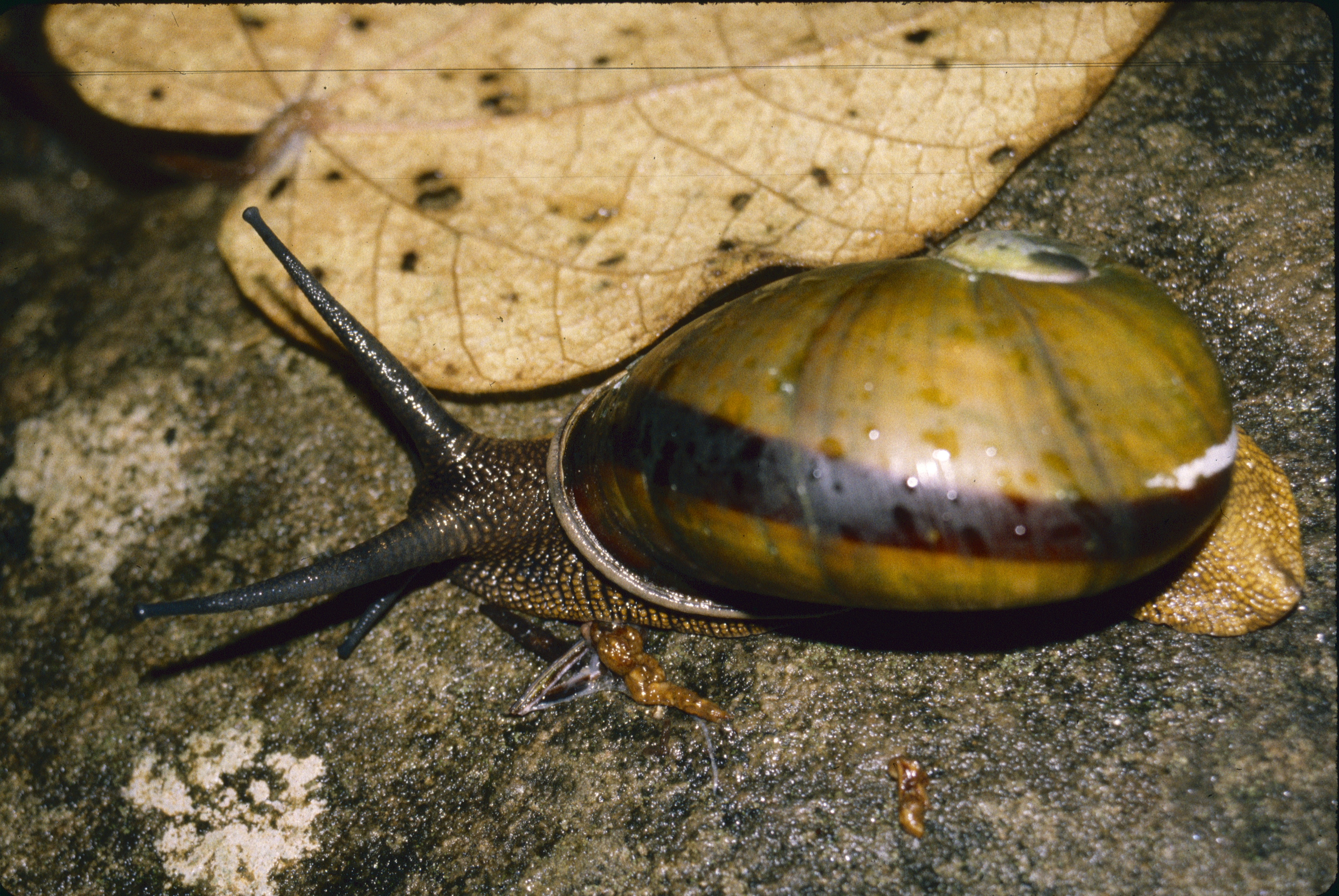
- Helicophanta souverbiana souverbiana

Scientific classification
- Kingdom: Animalia
- Phylum: Mollusca
- Class: Gastropoda
- Order: Stylommatophora
- Family: Acavidae
- Genus: Helicophanta
- Species: H. souverbiana

Binomial name
- Helicophanta souverbiana (Fischer, 1860)

Synonyms
- Helix souverbiana Fischer, 1860

= Helicophanta souverbiana =

Species of gastropod

Helicophanta souverbiana is a species of air-breathing land snail, a terrestrial pulmonate gastropods mollusk in the family Acavidae. The species occurs in Madagascar.

== Subspecies ==
- Helicophanta souverbiana souverbiana (Fischer, 1860)
- Helicophanta souverbiana audiberi Mousson, 1882
