= Madagasikara =

Madagasikara may be:

- The Malagasy name for Madagascar
- Madagasikara (gastropod), an animal genus
