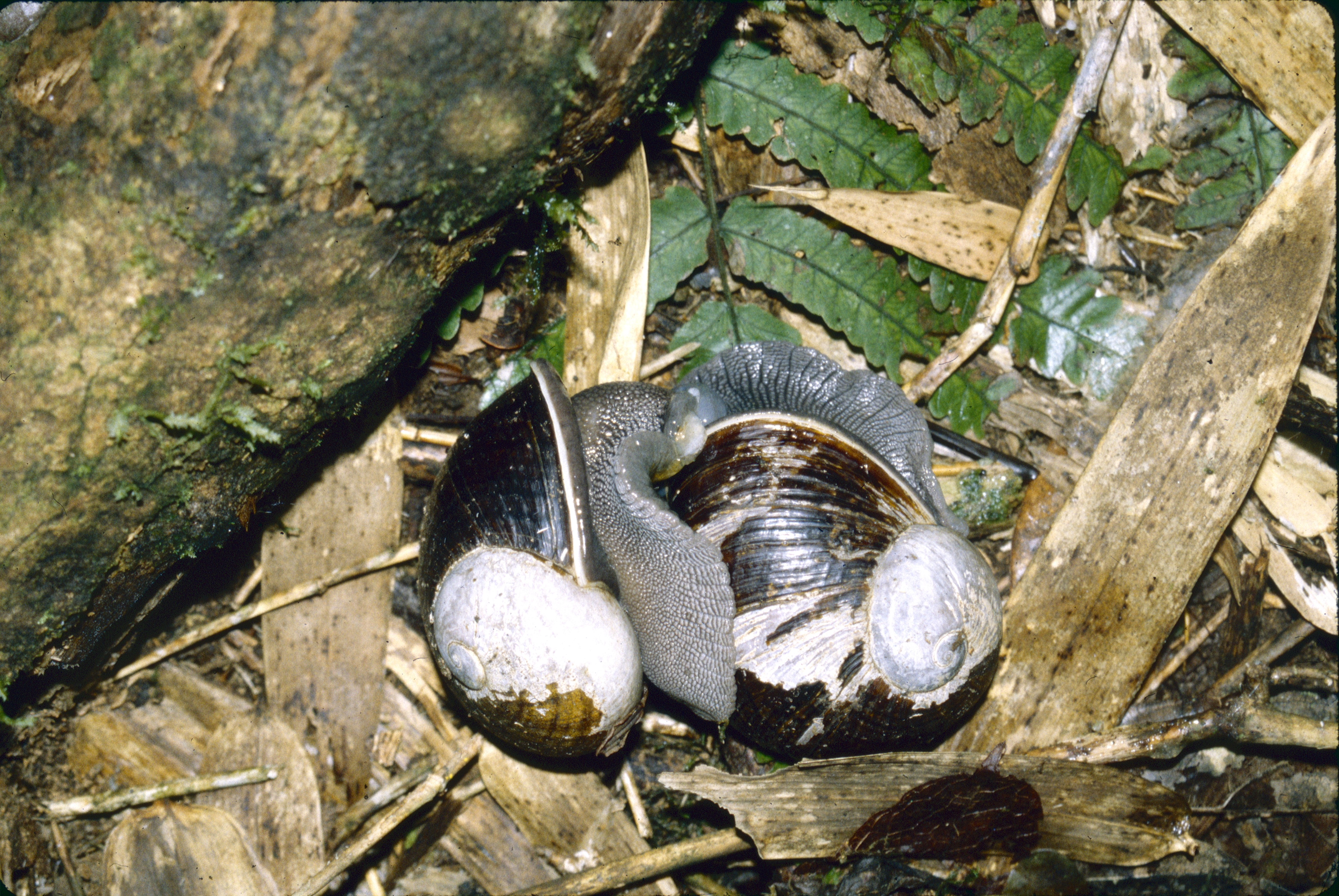
- A mating pair of Helicophanta ibaraoensis

Scientific classification
- Kingdom: Animalia
- Phylum: Mollusca
- Class: Gastropoda
- Order: Stylommatophora
- Family: Acavidae
- Genus: Helicophanta
- Species: H. ibaraoensis

Binomial name
- Helicophanta ibaraoensis (Angas, 1879)

Synonyms
- Helicophanta (Helicophanta) ibaraoensis (Angas, 1879) · alternative representation; Helix (Eurycratera) ibaraoensis Angas, 1879 superseded combination

= Helicophanta ibaraoensis =

Species of gastropod

Helicophanta ibaraoensis is a species of air-breathing land snail, a terrestrial pulmonate gastropod mollusk in the family Acavidae.

== Description ==
(Original description) The shell is imperforate and possesses a globosely ovate shape. It is moderately solid and has a shining luster. The surface is sculpted with irregular, transverse, and rugose striations at the front, while the upper whorls are very finely granulated. These granules descend all the way to the base toward the rear of the shell. Its coloration is a yellowish-olive, encircled by numerous narrow, dark brown bands that merge and intensify in color as they approach the aperture and the base.

The spire is flatly convex, terminating in a depressed apex. There are 3.5 whorls that increase rapidly in size, with the body whorl being particularly large and inflated. The aperture is oblique, large, and roundly ovate, exhibiting a pearly bluish-violet hue within. The peristome is slightly thickened, with its margins united by a thick callus, and the columella is smooth.

== Distribution ==
The species occurs in Madagascar.
