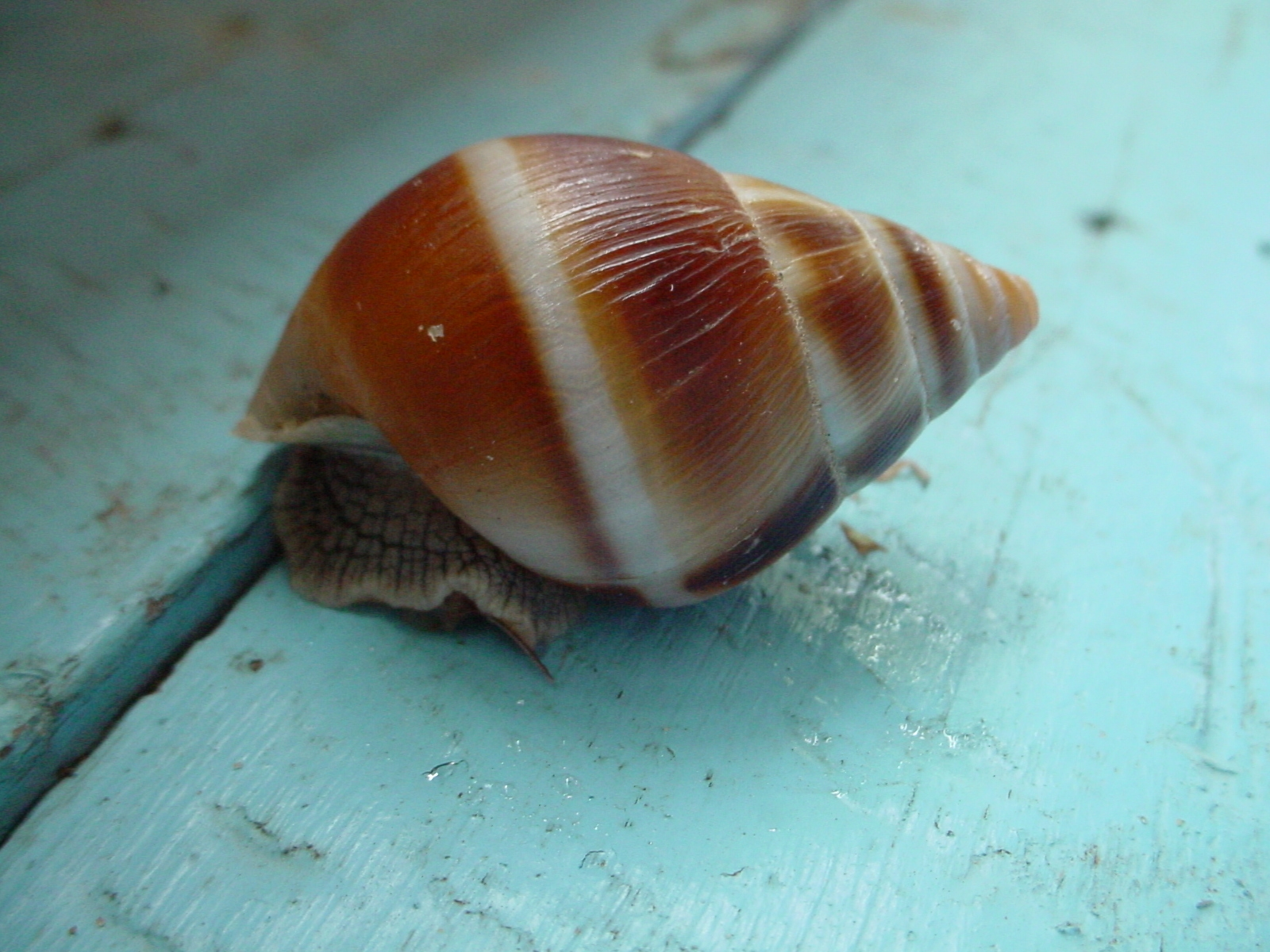
- A live individual of Leucotaenius favannii

Scientific classification
- Kingdom: Animalia
- Phylum: Mollusca
- Class: Gastropoda
- Order: Stylommatophora
- Family: Clavatoridae
- Genus: Leucotaenius
- Species: L. favannii

Binomial name
- Leucotaenius favannii (Lamarck, 1822)

= Leucotaenius favannii =

Species of gastropod

Leucotaenius favanii is a species of tropical air-breathing land snail, a terrestrial pulmonate gastropod mollusk in the family Clavatoridae.

== Distribution ==
This species occurs in Madagascar.
