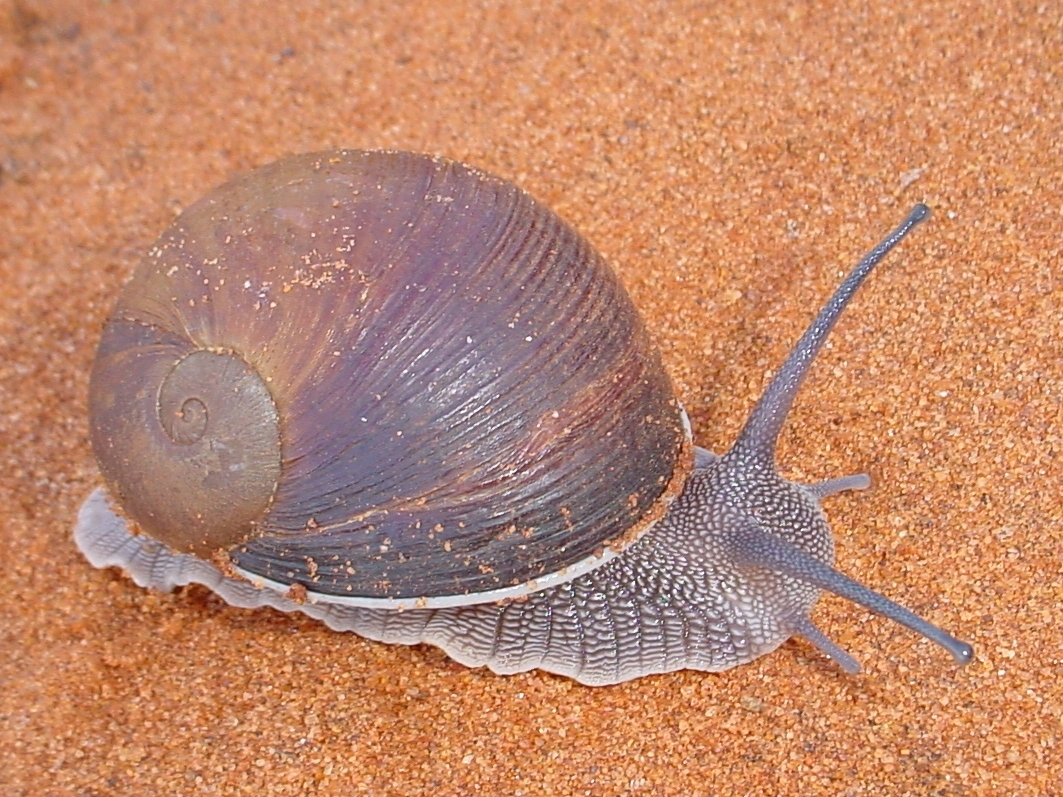

Scientific classification
- Kingdom: Animalia
- Phylum: Mollusca
- Class: Gastropoda
- Order: Stylommatophora
- Family: Acavidae
- Genus: Helicophanta
- Species: H. gloriosa

Binomial name
- Helicophanta gloriosa (L. Pfeiffer, 1856)

= Helicophanta gloriosa =

Species of gastropod

Helicophanta gloriosa is a species of tropical air-breathing land snail, a terrestrial pulmonate gastropod mollusc in the family Acavidae.

== Distribution ==
This species occurs in Madagascar.
