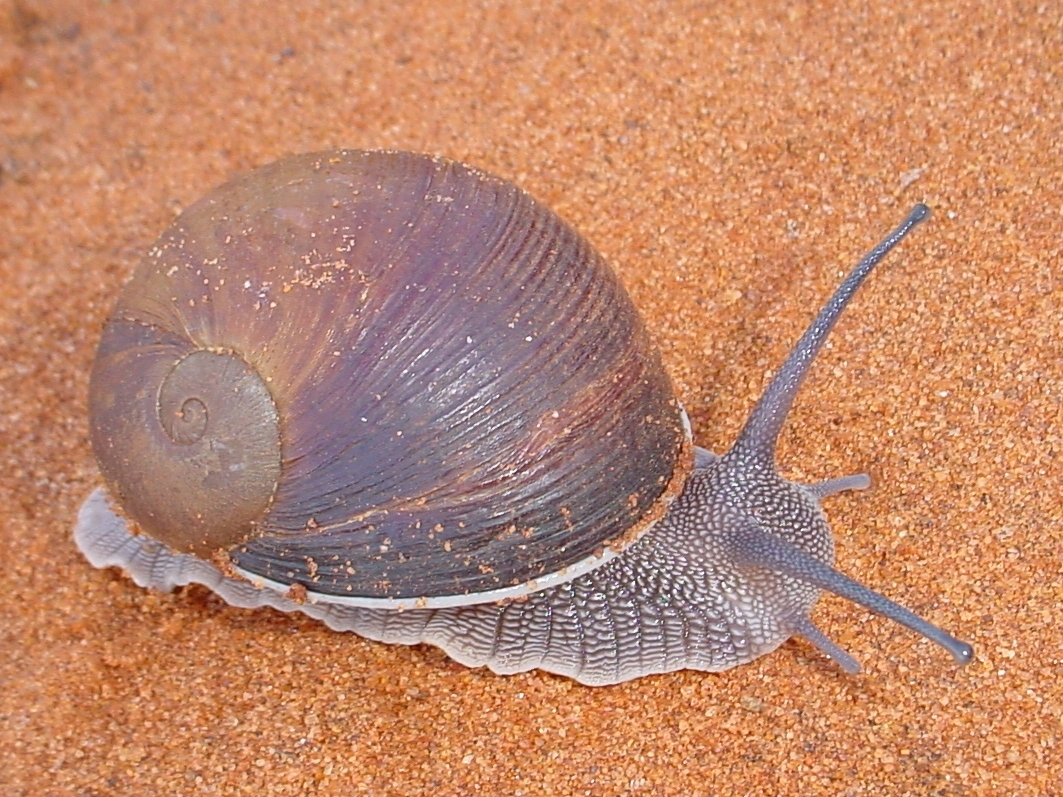
- Helicophanta gloriosa

Scientific classification
- Kingdom: Animalia
- Phylum: Mollusca
- Class: Gastropoda
- Order: Stylommatophora
- Family: Acavidae
- Genus: Helicophanta; Férussac, 1821

= Helicophanta =

Genus of gastropods

Helicophanta is a genus of air-breathing land snails, a terrestrial pulmonate gastropods mollusks in the family Acavidae.

== Species ==
Species within the genus Helicophanta include:

- Helicophanta amphibulima
- Helicophanta betsiloensis
- Helicophanta bicingulata
- Helicophanta falconeri
- Helicophanta farafanga
- Helicophanta gargantua
- Helicophanta geayi
- Helicophanta gloriosa
- Helicophanta goudotiana
- Helicophanta guesteriana
- Helicophanta ibaraoensis
- Helicophanta magnifica
- Helicophanta oviformis
- Helicophanta petiti
- Helicophanta socii
- Helicophanta souverbiana
- Helicophanta vesicalis
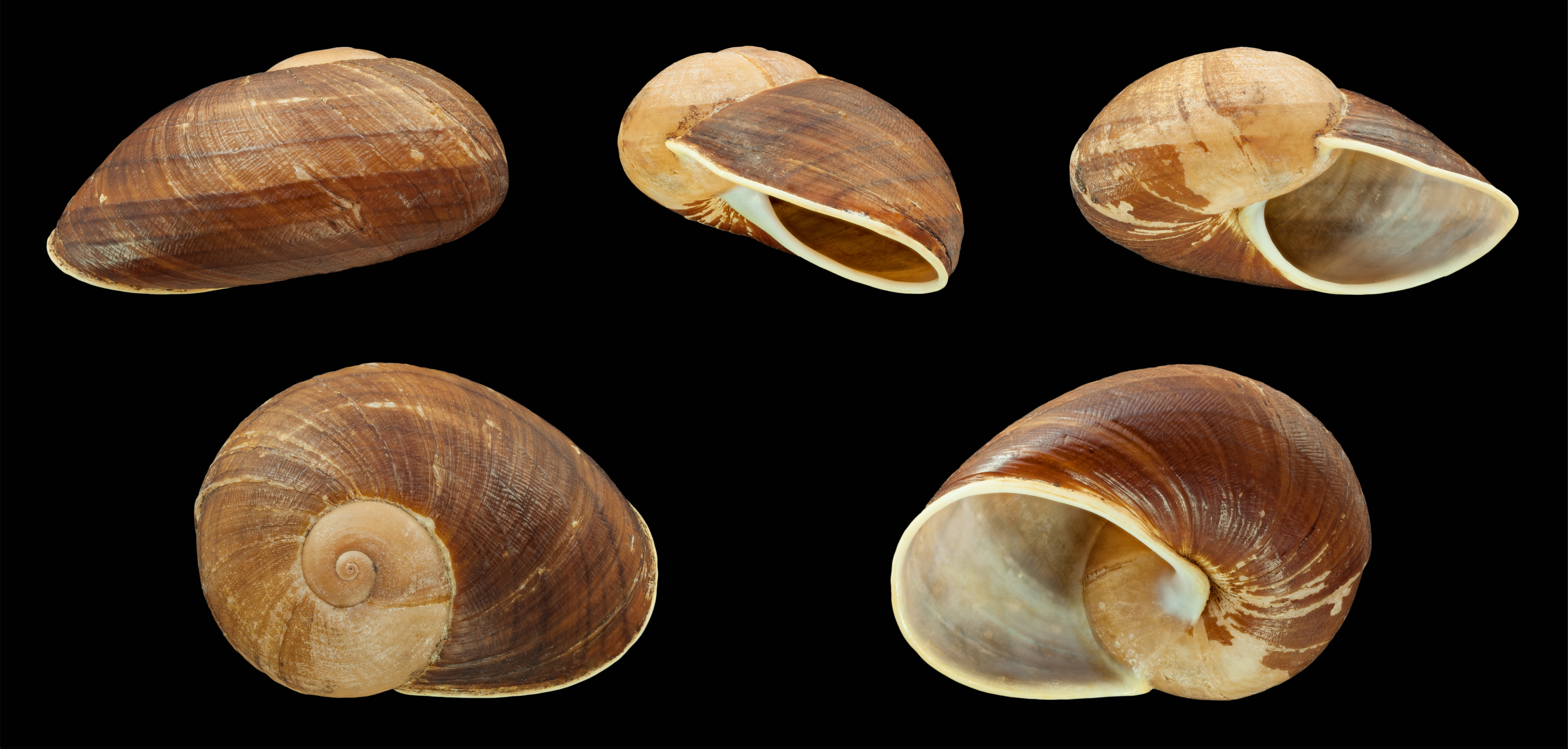
Helicophanta bicingulata

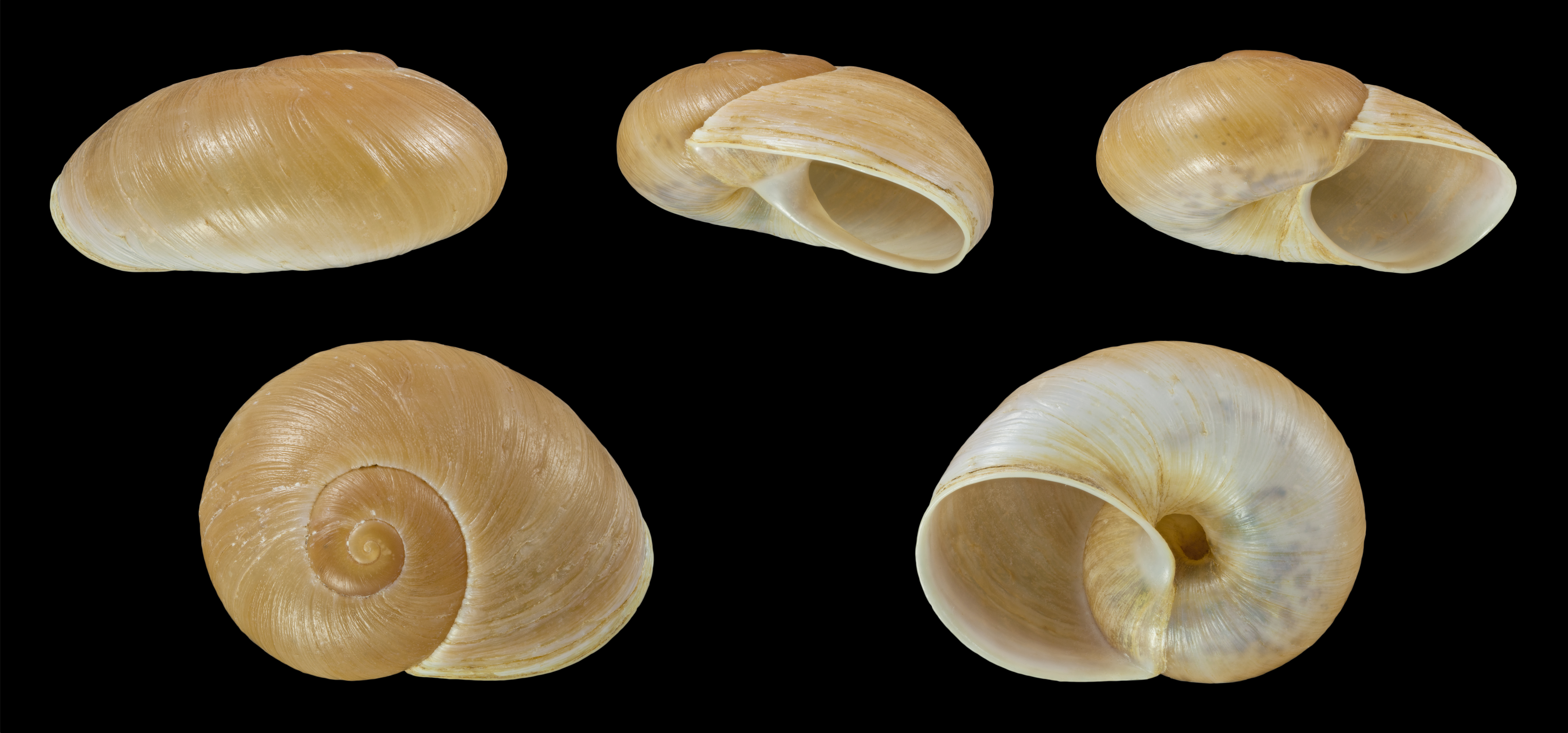
Helicophanta geayi

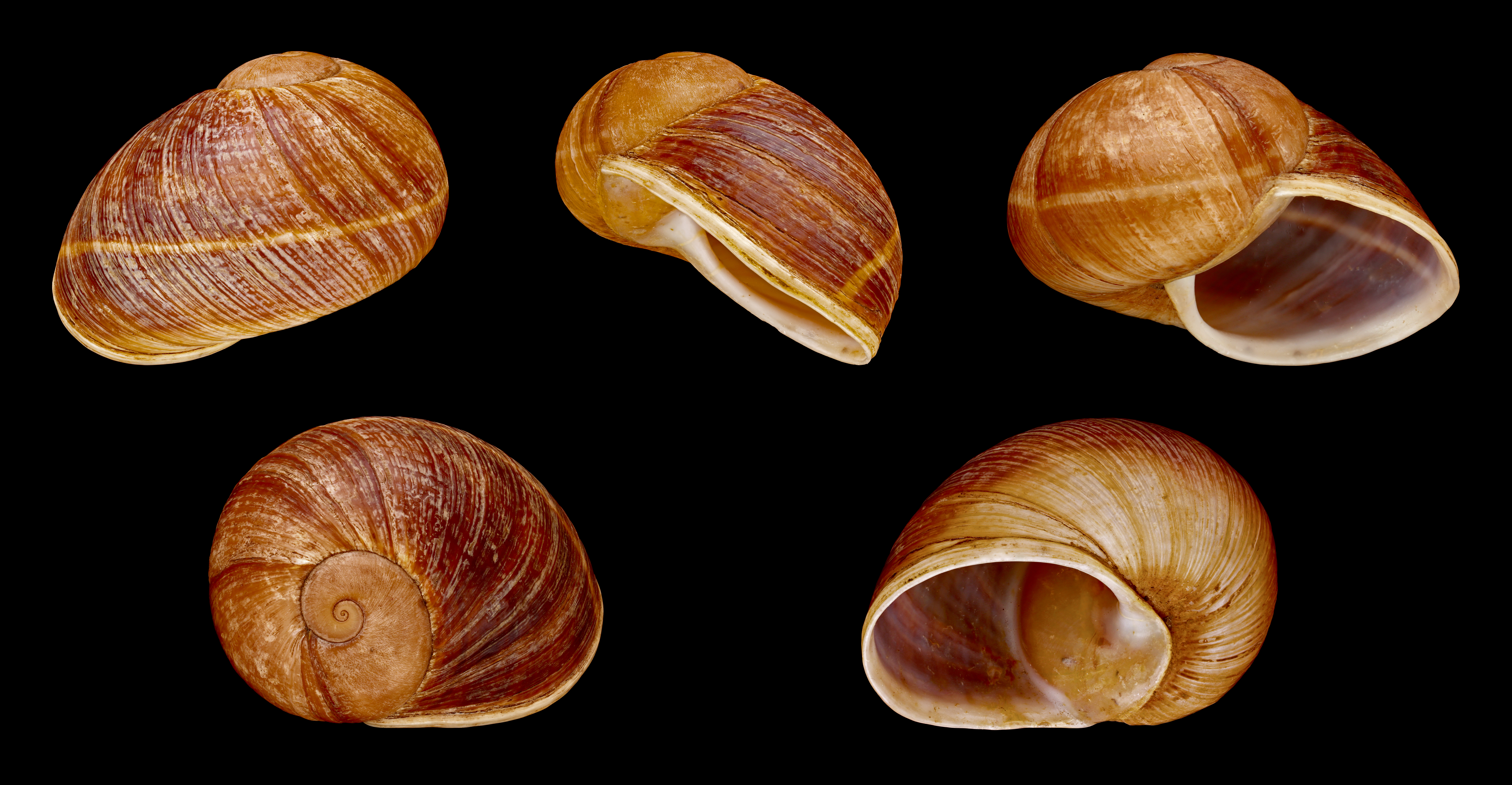
Helicophanta gloriosa

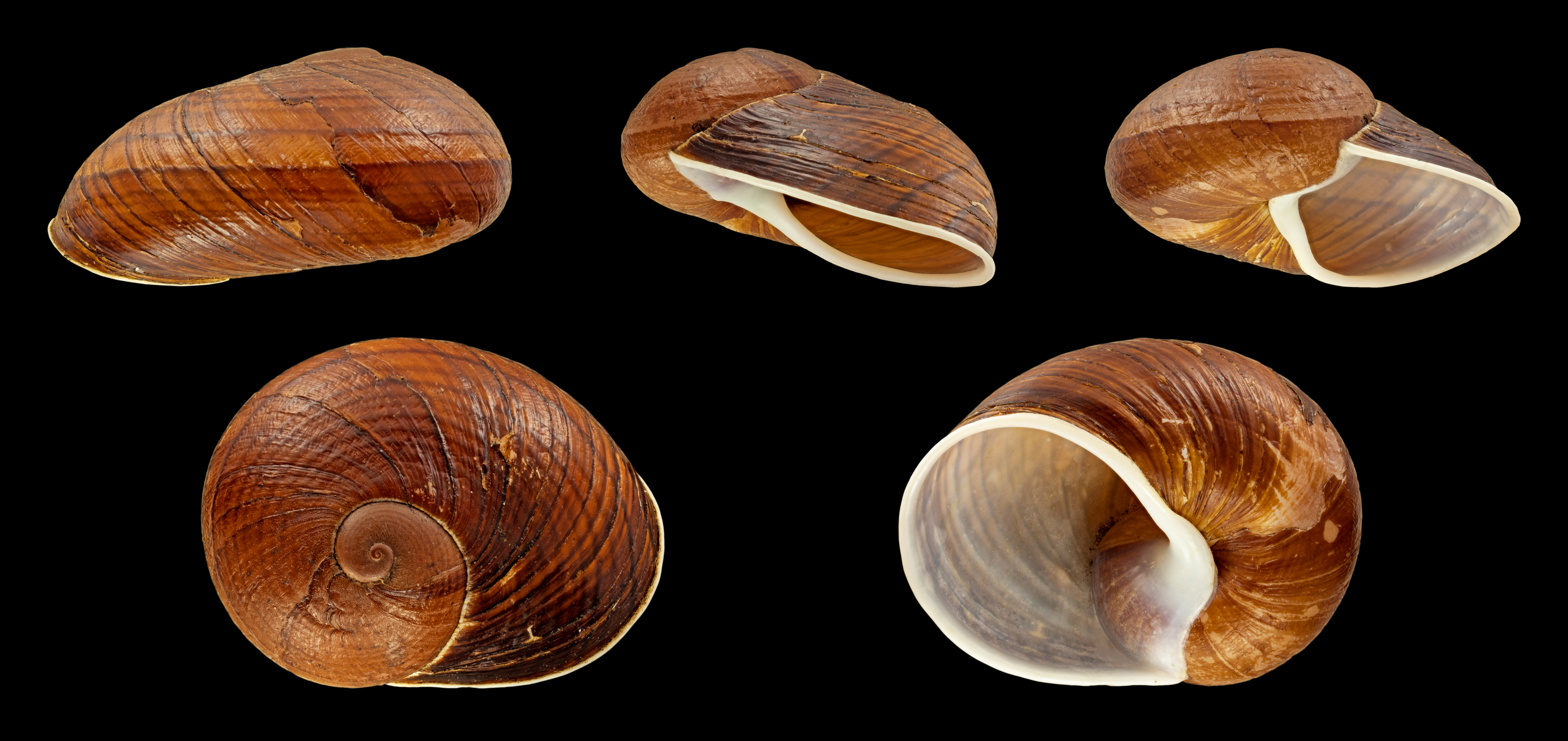
Helicophanta vesicalis
