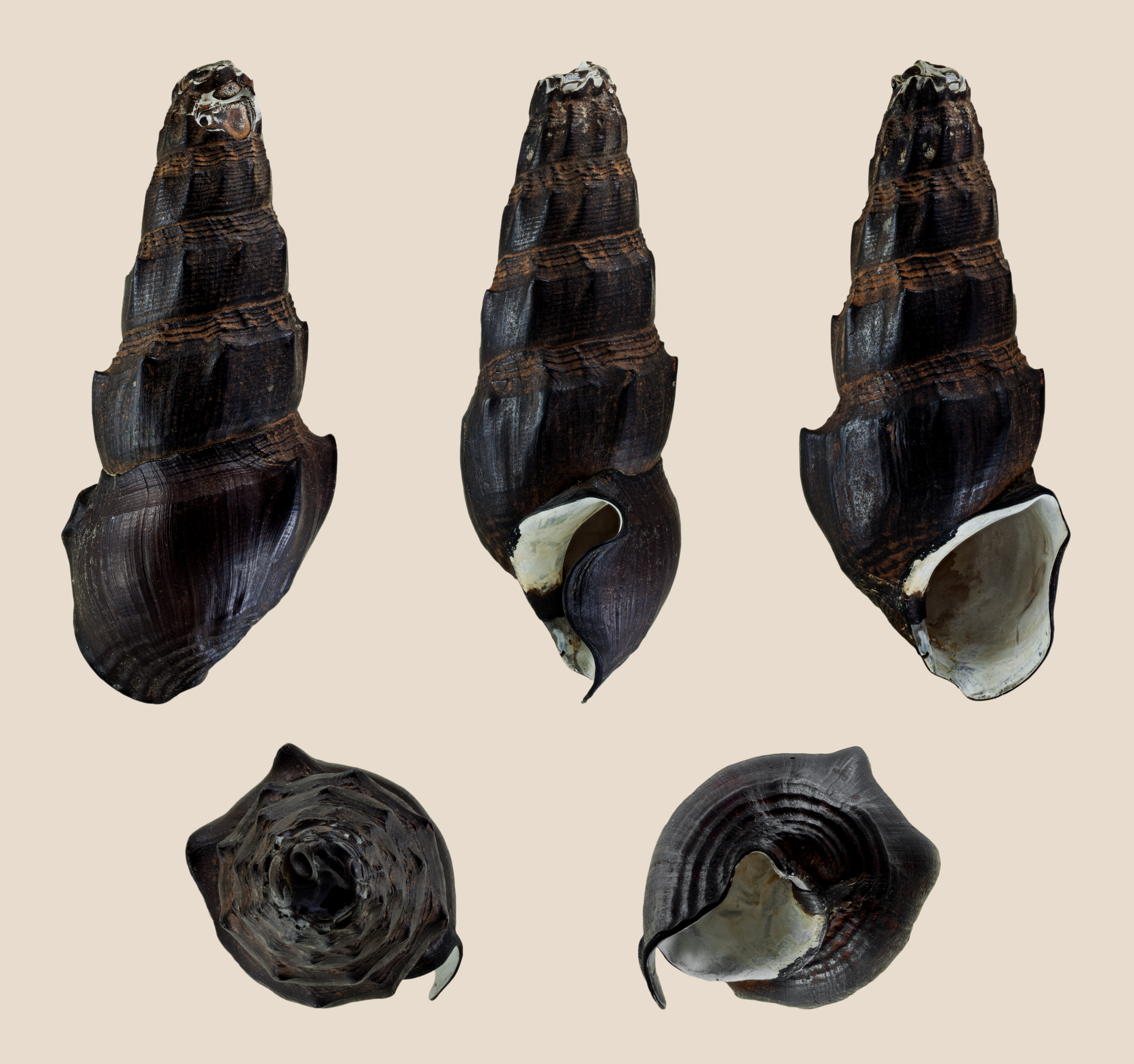
- Madagasikara spinosa

Conservation status
- Near Threatened (IUCN 3.1)

Scientific classification
- Kingdom: Animalia
- Phylum: Mollusca
- Class: Gastropoda
- Subclass: Caenogastropoda
- Order: incertae sedis
- Family: Pachychilidae
- Genus: Madagasikara
- Species: M. spinosa

Binomial name
- Madagasikara spinosa (Lamarck, 1822)

Synonyms
- Pirena spinosa Lamarck, 1822; Melanopsis spinosa; Pirena (Melanatria) spinosa; Melanatria fluminea (Gmelin, 1791); Melanatria spinosa; Melanopsis lamarckii Potiez & Michaud, 1838; Pirena lamarckii; Pirena fluminea Reeve, 1859; Melanatria fluminea; Pirena maura Reeve, 1859; Pirena lingulata Reeve, 1859; Pirena aspera Brot, 1862; Melanatria goudotiana Brot, 1879 in Brot, 1874-79

= Madagasikara spinosa =

Species of gastropod

Madagasikara spinosa is a species of tropical freshwater snail with a gill and an operculum, an aquatic gastropod mollusc in the family Pachychilidae.

Madagasikara spinosa is the type species of the genus Madagasikara.

== Distribution ==
This species is endemic to Madagascar. It was recorded in East Madagascar and in surrounding islands such as Île Sainte-Marie.

The type locality is "Dans le rivières de l'ile de Madagascar", in rivers of Madagascar.

== Description ==
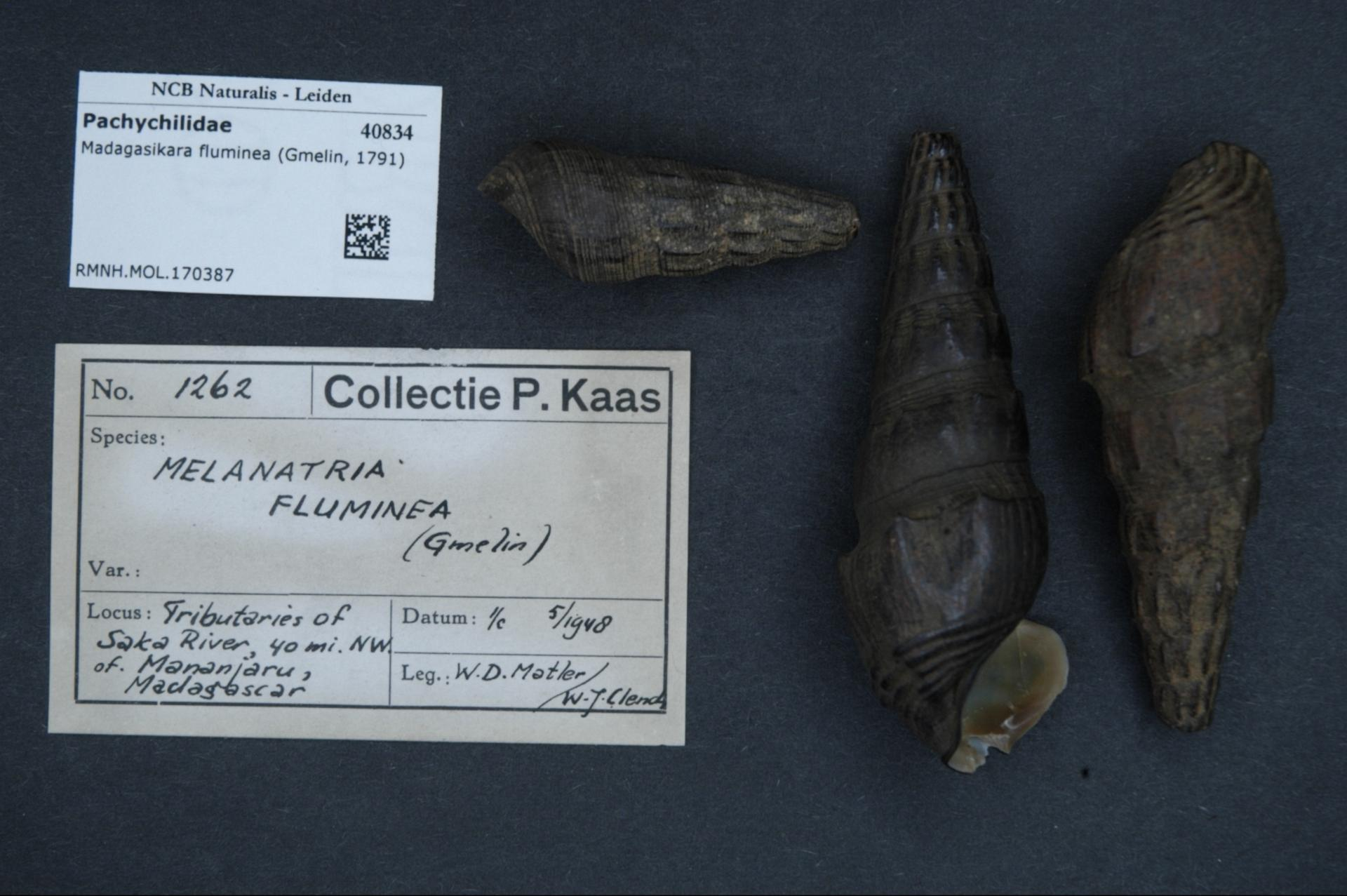
Shells of Madagasikara spinosa.

The shell is elongate and large and it has 5.0-11.0 whorls. The color of the shell is from brown to black. The apex is truncated. There are axial ribs especially on upper whorls. The aperture is widely oval with palatal and basal sinus.

The width of the shell is 9.9-28.3 mm. The height of the shell is 25.2-69.5 mm. The width of the aperture is 5.0-18.4 mm. The height of the aperture is 8.0-23.1 mm.

The operculum is oval and black.

The color of the animal is dark grey to black with yellowish dots. Tentacles are quite long. Radula is taeniglossate. Radula is about 16 mm long with about 127 rows of teeth.

== Ecology ==
It lives in fast running streams.

Sexes are separate (gonochorism). Females lays eggs (oviparous).
