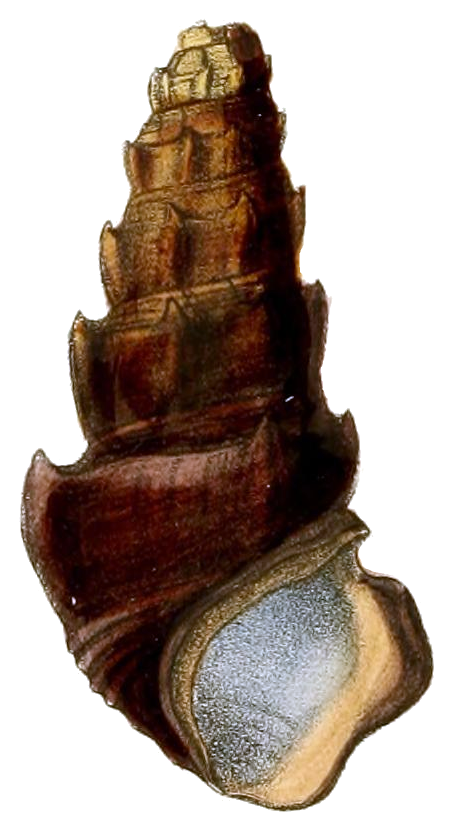
- Drawing of the apertural view of a shell of Madagasikara spinosa

Scientific classification
- Kingdom: Animalia
- Phylum: Mollusca
- Class: Gastropoda
- Subclass: Caenogastropoda
- Order: incertae sedis
- Family: Pachychilidae
- Genus: Madagasikara; Köhler & Glaubrecht, 2010

Diversity
- 6 species

Synonyms
- Melanatria Bowdich, 1822

= Madagasikara (gastropod) =

Genus of gastropods

Madagasikara is a genus of tropical freshwater snails with an operculum, aquatic gastropod molluscs in the family Pachychilidae.

The generic name Madagasikara is from the Malagasy language and means "Madagascar".

This genus is endemic to Madagascar.

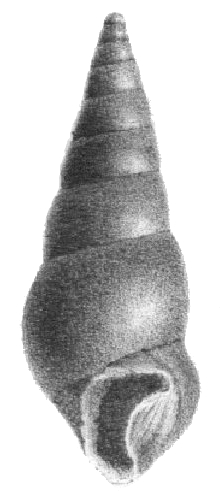
Apertural view of a shell of Madagasikara madagascariensis

== Nomenclature ==
In systematic literature before 2010 the name Melanatria Bowdich, 1822 was generally used for this group. Another name, which was used particularly in earlier taxonomic literature of the 19th century is Pirena Lamarck, 1799. However, it has been shown that both names are not available for this genus. The name Melanatria is a nomen dubium, not based on a recognizable species while the name Pirena is a junior synonym of Faunus Born, 1758, which is a different genus within the family Pachychilidae. Therefore, introduction of a new name, Madagasikara, was required to maintain a stable taxonomy.

== Species ==
Species within the genus Madagasikara include:

- Madagasikara johnsoni (E. A. Smith, 1882)
- Madagasikara madagascariensis (Grateloup, 1840)
- Madagasikara spinosa (Lamarck, 1822) - type species, the previously used name Melanatria fluminea is a synonym
- Madagasikara vazimba Köhler & Glaubrecht, 2010
- Madagasikara vivipara Köhler & Glaubrecht, 2010
- Madagasikara zazavavindrano Köhler & Glaubrecht, 2010
