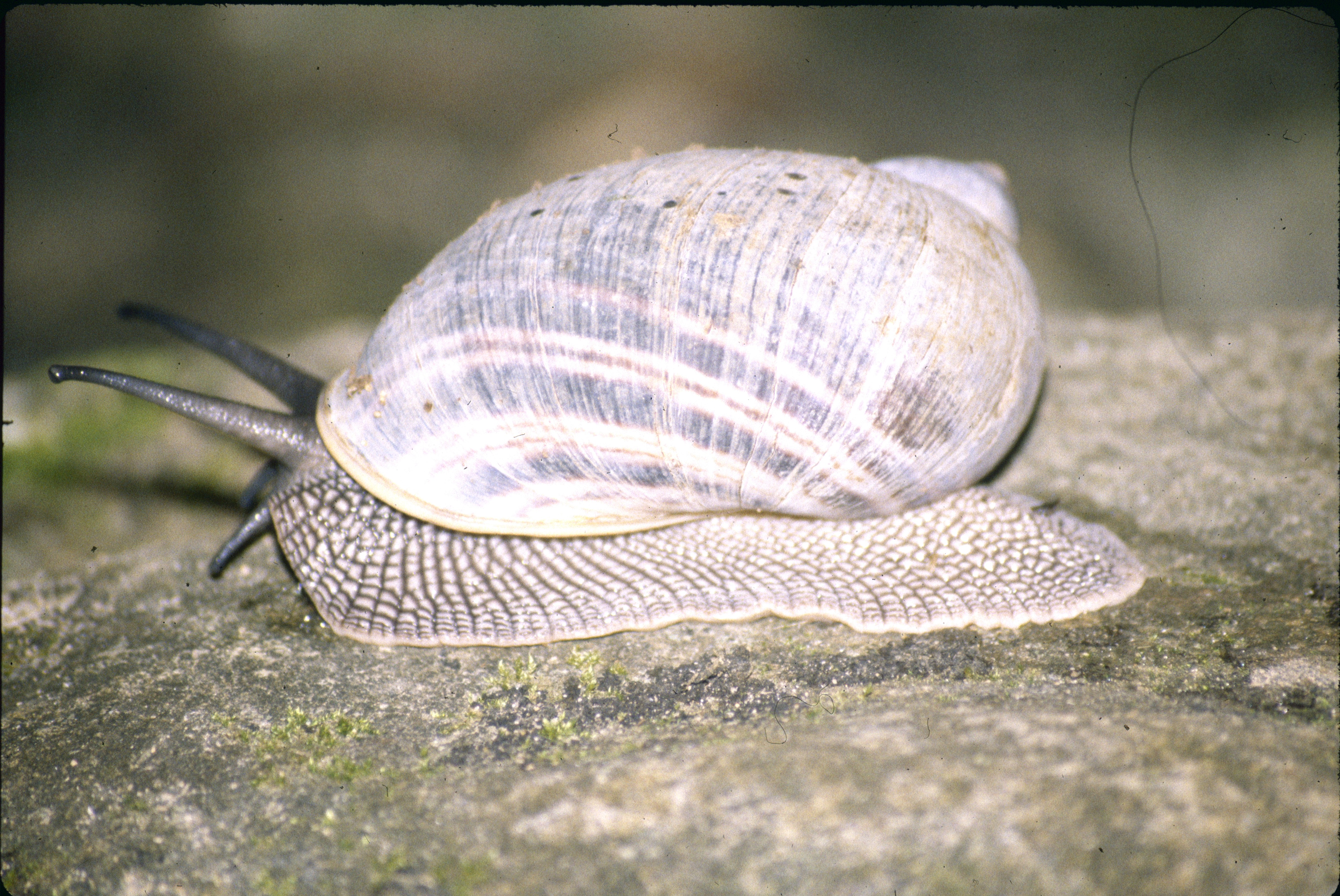
- A view of the left side of a live Embertoniphanta farafanga

Scientific classification
- Domain: Eukaryota
- Kingdom: Animalia
- Phylum: Mollusca
- Class: Gastropoda
- Order: Stylommatophora
- Family: Acavidae
- Genus: Embertoniphanta
- Species: E. farafanga

Binomial name
- Embertoniphanta farafanga (H. Adams, 1875)

Synonyms
- Helicophanta farafanga

= Embertoniphanta farafanga =

Species of gastropod

Embertoniphanta farafanga (syn. Helicophanta farafanga) is a species of air-breathing land snail, a terrestrial pulmonate gastropods mollusk in the family Acavidae. The species occurs in Madagascar.

Embertoniphanta farafanga is a burrower.
