= Ampelita julii =

Conservation status
- Endangered (IUCN 2.3)

Scientific classification
- Kingdom: Animalia
- Phylum: Mollusca
- Class: Gastropoda
- Order: Stylommatophora
- Family: Acavidae
- Genus: Ampelita
- Species: A. julii

Binomial name
- Ampelita julii Fisher-Piette & Gourreau, 1965

Species of gastropod

Ampelita julii is a species of tropical air-breathing land snail, a terrestrial pulmonate gastropod mollusk in the family Acavidae. This species is endemic to Madagascar.

== Subspecies ==
- Ampelita julii soa Emberton & Griffiths, 2009
