= Bulinus obtusispira =

Scientific classification
- Domain: Eukaryota
- Kingdom: Animalia
- Phylum: Mollusca
- Class: Gastropoda
- Superorder: Hygrophila
- Family: Planorbidae
- Genus: Bulinus
- Species: B. obtusispira

Binomial name
- Bulinus obtusispira (Smith, 1882)

Synonyms
- Physa obtusispira Smith, 1882

Species of gastropod

Bulinus obtusispira is a species of a tropical freshwater snail with a sinistral shell, an aquatic gastropod mollusk in the family Planorbidae, the ramshorn snails and their allies.

== Distribution ==
The type locality is about 32 km far from Tananarive, Madagascar.

== Description ==
The width of the shell is 6.5 mm. The height of the shell is 8.8 mm.
