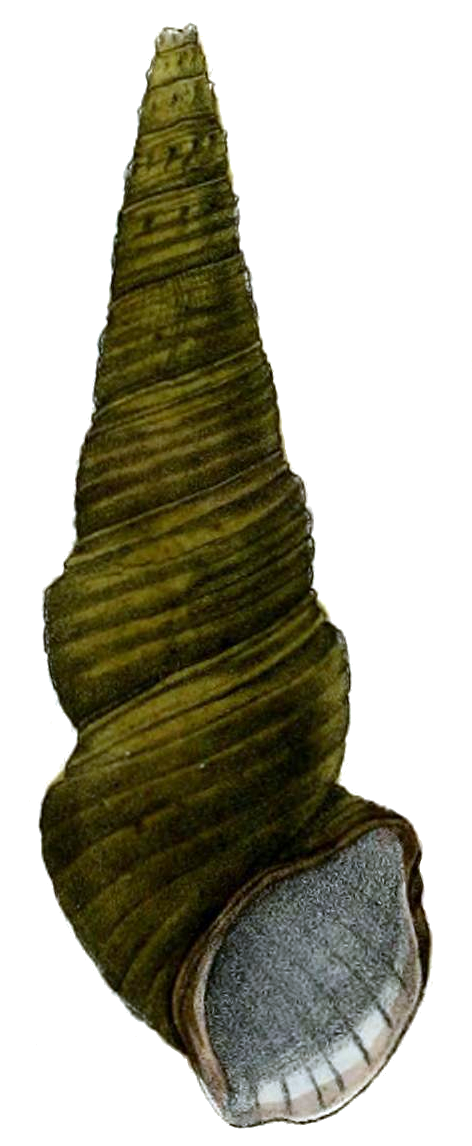
- Apertural view of a shell of Madagasikara johnsoni

Conservation status
- Endangered (IUCN 3.1)

Scientific classification
- Kingdom: Animalia
- Phylum: Mollusca
- Class: Gastropoda
- Subclass: Caenogastropoda
- Order: incertae sedis
- Family: Pachychilidae
- Genus: Madagasikara
- Species: M. johnsoni

Binomial name
- Madagasikara johnsoni (E. A. Smith, 1882)

Synonyms
- Melanatria johnsoni E. A. Smith, 1822; Melanatria fluminea (partim)

= Madagasikara johnsoni =

Species of gastropod

Madagasikara johnsoni is a species of tropical freshwater snail with a gill and an operculum, an aquatic gastropod mollusc in the family Pachychilidae.

== Distribution ==
This species is endemic to Madagascar. The only precisely known locality is in Ankara Sontsitra National Park, West Madagaskar.

The type locality was given as "River Kamony, in the north-west of the island", but the thereabouts of this locality has not been exactly determined. The most detailed version of the type locality is that of the Kamoro River drainage in Mahajanga Province, north-west Madagascar.

== Description ==
Madagasikara johnsoni was originally discovered and described (under the name Melanatria johnsoni) by Edgar Albert Smith in 1882.

The shell is large, elongate-pyramidal, turreted, thick, covered with an olive epidermis. It is closely lineated or strigate with longitudinal lines of a darker tint. The shell has nine whorls. Whorls are very slightly convex beneath, strongly spirally ribbed and grooved. The ribs are six in number on the upper whorls and rounded; the two above are much more slender than the four beneath; the uppermost borders the suture; the next lies in the concavity at the top of the whorls; and the rest surround the slight convexity, and are three times as broad as the sulci separating them. All the whorls, with the exception of the last four, are coronated at the slight angle below the excavation with very short, hollow, oblique spinules. Some of the spiral grooves exhibit rows of fine granules. The last whorl descends somewhat, giving the shell a slightly distorted appearance. It is girded with about twelve transverse costae, a few at the base being smaller than five principal ones around the middle.

The aperture is bluish within, faintly stained with olive-brown near the margins. The peristome widely and deeply sinuated on the outer lip in the concavity of the whorl, arcuate and prominent in the middle, then shallowly sinuated again. Columellar margin is thickened, free, arcuate, reflexed, ending in a distinct basal sinus.

The width of the shell is 24–28.9 mm. The height of the shell is 69.9-77.7 mm. The width of the aperture is 14.0-14.2 mm. The height of the aperture is 20.5-21.0 mm.

There is not known description of operculum. There is also not known anatomy of this species. Reproduction strategy is also unknown.
