= Boucardicus esetrae =

Conservation status
- Endangered (IUCN 3.1)

Scientific classification
- Kingdom: Animalia
- Phylum: Mollusca
- Class: Gastropoda
- Subclass: Caenogastropoda
- Order: Architaenioglossa
- Family: Hainesiidae
- Genus: Boucardicus
- Species: B. esetrae

Binomial name
- Boucardicus esetrae Emberton & Pearce, 1999

Species of gastropod

Boucardicus esetrae is a species of land snail with an operculum, a terrestrial gastropod mollusc in the family Hainesiidae.

This species is endemic to Madagascar. Its natural habitat is subtropical or tropical dry forests. It is threatened by habitat loss.
