= Boucardicus monchenkoi =

Scientific classification
- Kingdom: Animalia
- Phylum: Mollusca
- Class: Gastropoda
- Subclass: Caenogastropoda
- Order: Architaenioglossa
- Family: Hainesiidae
- Genus: Boucardicus
- Species: B. monchenkoi

Binomial name
- Boucardicus monchenkoi Balashov & Griffiths, 2015

Species of gastropod

Boucardicus monchenkoi is a species of land snail with an operculum, a terrestrial gastropod mollusc in the family Hainesiidae.

This species is endemic to Madagascar, and occurs near Tôlanaro.

== Etymology ==
The specific name, monchenkoi, honors the collector of the first known specimen, Professor Vladislav Monchenko, Academician of National Academy of Sciences of Ukraine, founder of the Department of Invertebrate Fauna and Systematics of I.I. Schmalhausen Institute of Zoology.

== Shell description ==
The shell of B. monchenkoi is pupilloid-like and clearly ribbed, reaching 2.6–2.9 mm in height, and 1.3–1.5 mm in diameter. The aperture is ovate-triangular with a single well developed columellar lamella that goes from the beginning of the body whorl until the edge of the aperture, where it is clearly visible. The shell's peristome is complete and not reflected.
