= Boucardicus ambindaensis =

Scientific classification
- Kingdom: Animalia
- Phylum: Mollusca
- Class: Gastropoda
- Subclass: Caenogastropoda
- Order: Architaenioglossa
- Family: Hainesiidae
- Genus: Boucardicus
- Species: B. ambindaensis

Binomial name
- Boucardicus ambindaensis Balashov & Griffiths, 2015

Species of gastropod

Boucardicus ambindaensis is a species of land snail with an operculum, a terrestrial gastropod mollusc in the family Hainesiidae.

This species is endemic to Madagascar, occurs in Tsingy Beanka reserve, around 50 km east of Maintirano city.

== Etymology ==
From occurrence near Ambinda village.

== Shell description ==
Shell is pupilloid-like, almost smooth (with weak radial lines), aperture is almost round, with single columellar lamella relatively deep in aperture that goes through almost whole body-whorl inside it and single palatal lamella in the begging of body-whorl (could be visible through wall of shell). Basal peristome is almost complete, slightly reflected. Height of shell 2.4–2.5 mm, diameter 1.2–1.3 mm.
