= Boucardicus fortistriatus =

Conservation status
- Critically Endangered (IUCN 3.1)

Scientific classification
- Kingdom: Animalia
- Phylum: Mollusca
- Class: Gastropoda
- Subclass: Caenogastropoda
- Order: Architaenioglossa
- Family: Hainesiidae
- Genus: Boucardicus
- Species: B. fortistriatus

Binomial name
- Boucardicus fortistriatus Emberton & Pearce, 1999.

Species of gastropod

Boucardicus fortistriatus is a species of land snail with an operculum, a terrestrial gastropod mollusc in the family Hainesiidae.

This species is endemic to Madagascar where its natural habitat is subtropical or tropical dry forests. It lives in the Toliara Province of Madagascar, and is found only above 860 m (2,820 ft) ASL on Mount Vasiha.

== Conservation status ==
B. fortistriatus was assessed as critically endangered in 2000. The status was assessed by K. C. Emberton, one of the species' authorities, and evaluated by M. B. Seddon of the Mollusc Red List Authority. The species was found to meet three of the 'critically endangered' species criteria - B1, that the existing population is "severely fragmented or known to exist at only a single location", and B2cd, that a continuing decline is projected in the species' "area, extent and/or quality of habitat" and "number of locations or subpopulations". B. fortistriatus is furthermore estimated to occupy less than 10 km^{2} (3.9 sq mi). This species' habitat within Madagascar is being destroyed by slash and burn agriculture, according to the IUCN.
