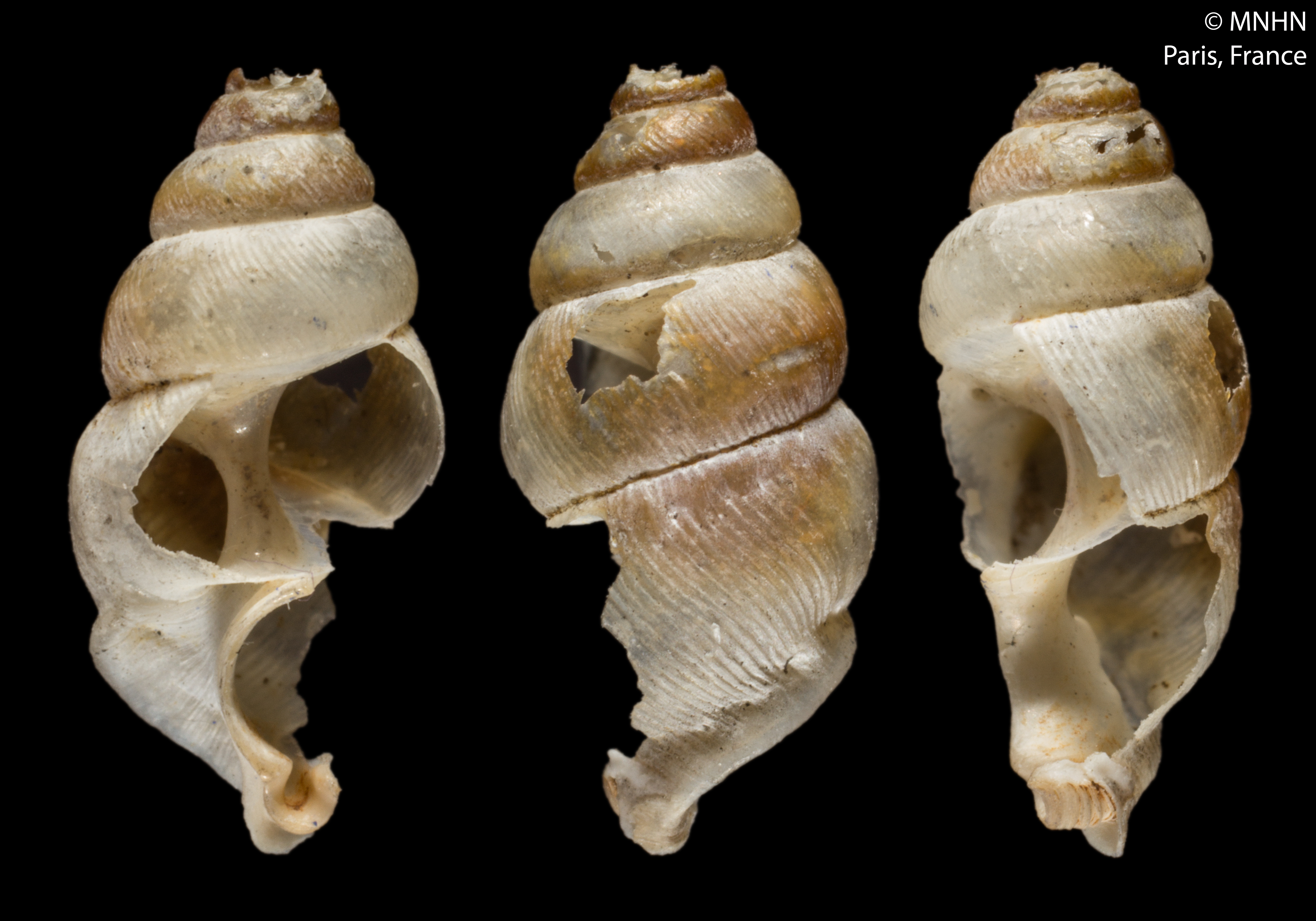
- Shell of Boucardicus goudoti (holotype at MNHN, Paris)

Scientific classification
- Kingdom: Animalia
- Phylum: Mollusca
- Class: Gastropoda
- Subclass: Caenogastropoda
- Order: Architaenioglossa
- Superfamily: Cyclophoroidea
- Family: Hainesiidae
- Genus: Boucardicus; Fischer-Piette & Bedoucha, 1965

Type species
- Acroptychia notabilis E. A. Smith, 1892

Synonyms
- Madecataulus Fischer-Piette & Bedoucha, 1965

= Boucardicus =

Genus of gastropods

Boucardicus is a genus of land snails with an operculum, terrestrial gastropod mollusks in the family Hainesiidae.

It is endemic to Madagascar, and consists of 199 species and 5 subspecies. The genus's type species is Boucardicus notabilis (Smith, 1892). Species within the genus are very diverse, with some species being medium-sized (about 10 mm) and carrying conical shells, others small (height 1.5-3.5 mm) with cylindrical "pupilloid-like" shells.

== Species ==
Species within the genus Boucardicus include:

- Boucardicus notabilis (type species)
- Boucardicus albocinctus
- Boucardicus ambindaensis
- Boucardicus antiquus
- Boucardicus carylae
- Boucardicus culminans
- Boucardicus curvifolius
- Boucardicus delicatus
- Boucardicus divei
- Boucardicus esetrae
- Boucardicus fidimananai
- Boucardicus fortistriatus
- Boucardicus goudoti (Fischer-Piette & Bedoucha, 1965)
- Boucardicus magnilobatus
- Boucardicus mahermanae
- Boucardicus monchenkoi
- Boucardicus rakotoarisoni
- Boucardicus randalanai
- Boucardicus simplex
- Boucardicus tridentatus
- Boucardicus victorhernandezi
- Boucardicus anjarae
- Boucardicus avo
- Boucardicus hetra
- Boucardicus lalinify
- Boucardicus mahavariana
- Boucardicus matoatoa
- Boucardicus menoi
- Boucardicus peggyae
- Boucardicus pulchellus
- Boucardicus tantelyae
