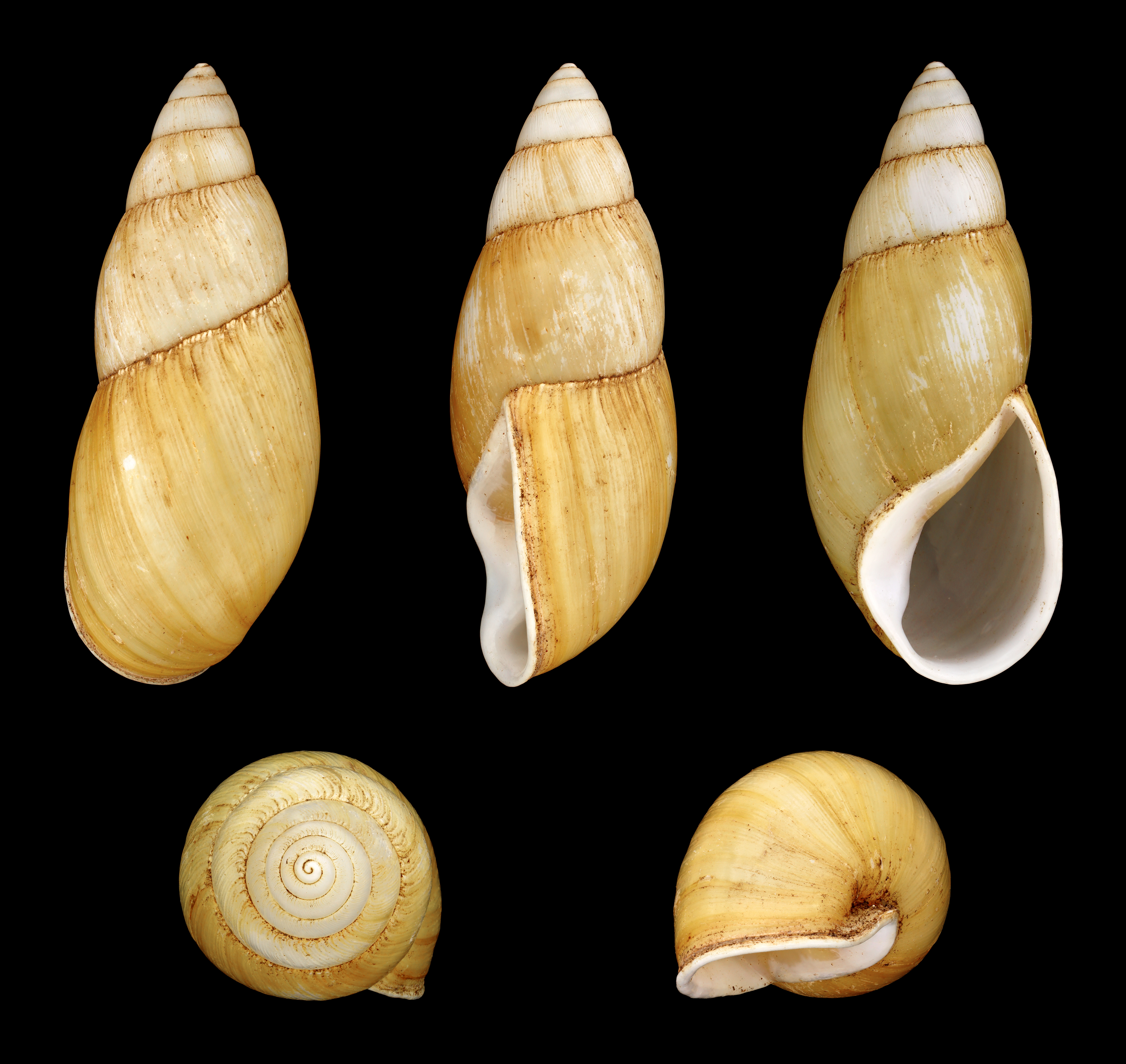
- Clavator grandidieri (Crosse & Fischer, 1868)

Scientific classification
- Kingdom: Animalia
- Phylum: Mollusca
- Class: Gastropoda
- Order: Stylommatophora
- Infraorder: Rhytidoidei
- Superfamily: Rhytidoidea
- Family: Clavatoridae
- Genus: Clavator; Martens, 1860

Synonyms
- Clavator (Clavator) E. von Martens, 1860 alternative representation; Clavator (Cylindroclavator) Groh & Poppe, 2002 alternative representation; Stenogyra (Clavator) E. von Martens, 1860 (original rank)

= Clavator =

Genus of gastropods

Clavator is a genus of air-breathing land snails, terrestrial pulmonate gastropod mollusks in the family Clavatoridae.

== Species ==
- Clavator anteclavator Germain, 1913
- Clavator bathiei Fischer-Piette & Salvat, 1963
- Clavator clavator (Petit de la Saussaye, 1844)
- Clavator dingeoni Fischer-Piette, F. Blanc & Salvat, 1975
- Clavator eximius (Shuttleworth, 1852)
- Clavator grandidieri (Crosse & P. Fischer, 1868)
- Clavator griffithsjonesi K. C. Emberton, 1999
- Clavator masoalae K. C. Emberton, 1999
- Clavator pauliani Fischer-Piette & Salvat, 1963
- Clavator praecox Fischer-Piette & Salvat, 1963

Synonyms

- Clavator balstoni (Angas, 1877) : synonym of Clavator eximius (Shuttleworth, 1852) (junior synonym)
- Clavator crassilabris (J. E. Gray, 1834) : synonym of Leucotaenius crassilabris (J. E. Gray, 1834) (superseded combination)
- Clavator heimburgi Kobelt, 1901 : synonym of Leucotaenius heimburgi (Kobelt, 1901) (original combination)
- Clavator johnsoni (E. A. Smith, 1882) : synonym of Clavator eximius (Shuttleworth, 1852) (junior synonym)
- Clavator moreleti (Deshayes, 1851) : synonym of Paraclavator moreleti (Deshayes, 1851) (superseded combination)
- Clavator obtusatus (Gmelin, 1791) : synonym of Paraclavator obtusatus (Gmelin, 1791) (unaccepted combination)
- Clavator placostyloides Kobelt, 1900 : synonym of Clavator grandidieri (Crosse & P. Fischer, 1868) (junior synonym)
- Clavator soltanensis Jodot, 1938 † : synonym of Maghrebiola soltanensis (Jodot, 1938) † (superseded combination)
- Clavator vayssierei Ancey, 1900 : synonym of Clavator grandidieri (Crosse & P. Fischer, 1868) (junior synonym)
- Clavator watersi (Angas, 1878) : synonym of Paraclavator watersi (Angas, 1878) (superseded combination)
