= Boucardicus albocinctus =

Conservation status
- Vulnerable (IUCN 3.1)

Scientific classification
- Kingdom: Animalia
- Phylum: Mollusca
- Class: Gastropoda
- Subclass: Caenogastropoda
- Order: Architaenioglossa
- Family: Hainesiidae
- Genus: Boucardicus
- Species: B. albocinctus

Binomial name
- Boucardicus albocinctus E.A. Smith, 1893

Species of gastropod

Boucardicus albocinctus is a species of land snail with an operculum, a terrestrial gastropod mollusc in the family Hainesiidae.

This species is endemic to Madagascar. It lives in subtropical or tropical dry forests. The survival of this species is threatened by habitat destruction.
