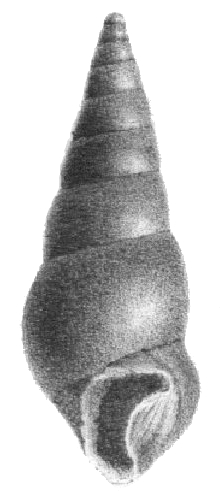
- apertural view of a shell of Madagasikara madagascariensis

Conservation status
- Endangered (IUCN 3.1)

Scientific classification
- Kingdom: Animalia
- Phylum: Mollusca
- Class: Gastropoda
- Subclass: Caenogastropoda
- Order: incertae sedis
- Family: Pachychilidae
- Genus: Madagasikara
- Species: M. madagascarensis

Binomial name
- Madagasikara madagascarensis (Grateloup, 1840)

Synonyms
- Melania madagascariensis Grateloup, 1840; Pirena madagascariensis; Melanatria madagascariensis; Melania dusabonis Grateloup, 1840; Melania bicarinata Grateloup, 1840; Pirena debeauxiana Crosse, 1862; Melanatria debeauxiana; Melanatria fluminea (partim)

= Madagasikara madagascariensis =

Madagasikara madagascarensis

Species of gastropod

Madagasikara madagascarensis s a species of tropical freshwater snail with a gill and an operculum, an aquatic gastropod mollusc in the family Pachychilidae.

This species is endemic to Madagascar.

== Description ==
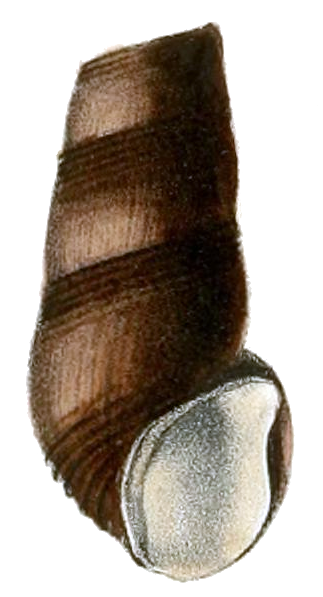
Drawing of apertural view of a shell (without some of top whorls) of Madagasikara madagascariensis.

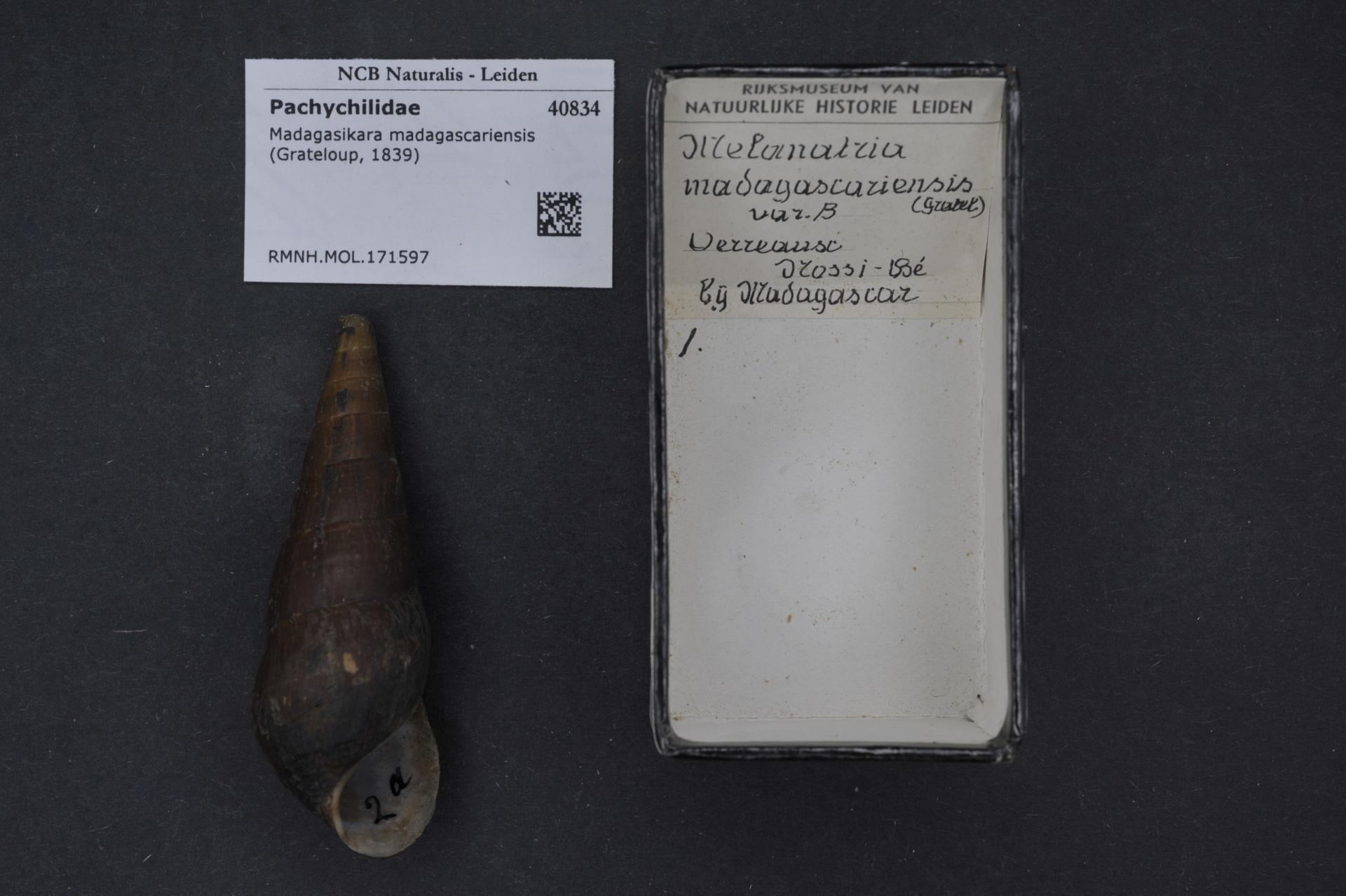
Photo of shells.

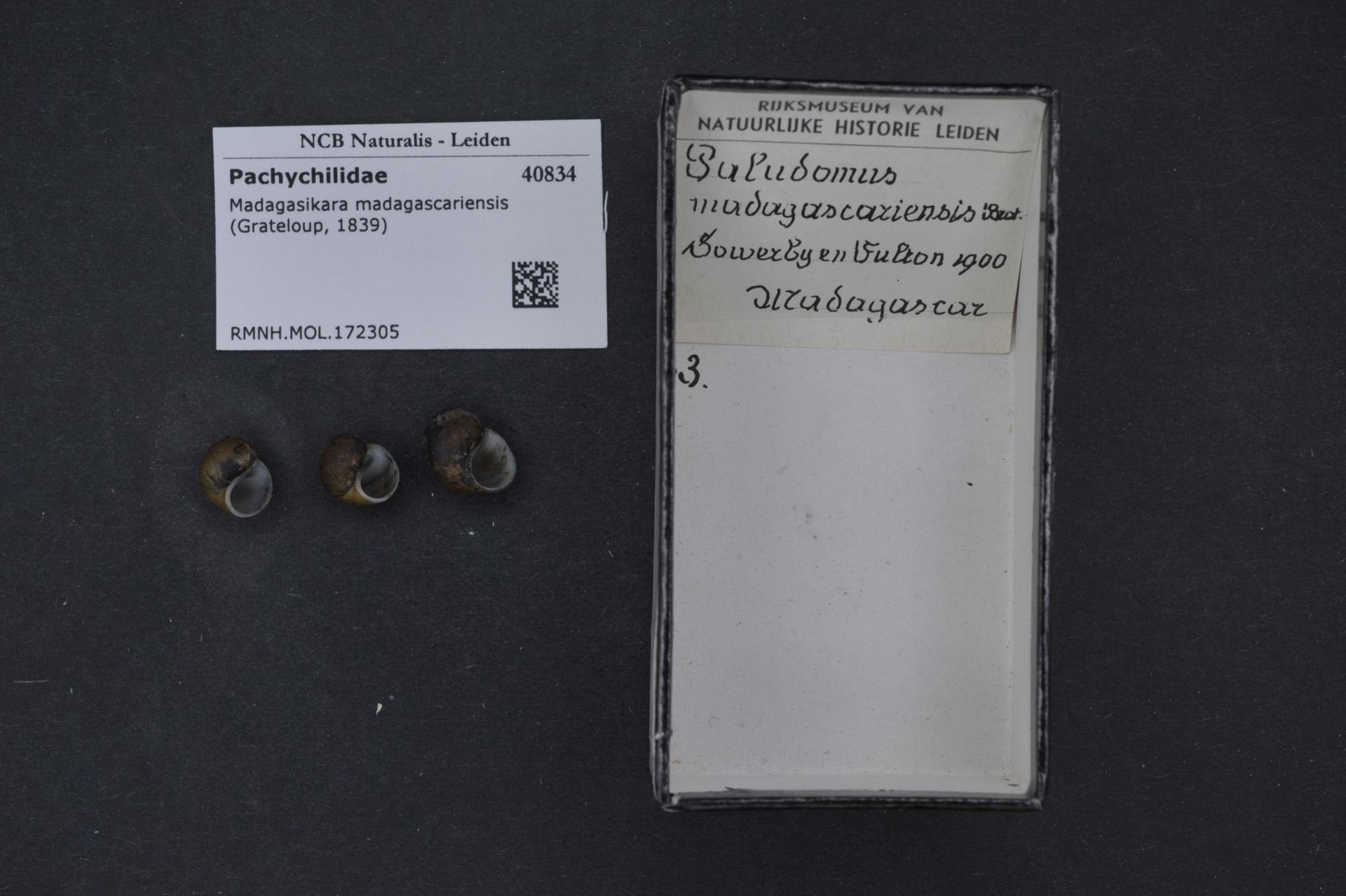
Juvenile shells.
