= Pirena zazavavindrano =

Conservation status
- Critically Endangered (IUCN 3.1)

Scientific classification
- Kingdom: Animalia
- Phylum: Mollusca
- Class: Gastropoda
- Subclass: Caenogastropoda
- Order: incertae sedis
- Family: Pachychilidae
- Genus: Pirena
- Species: P. zazavavindrano

Binomial name
- Pirena zazavavindrano Köhler & Glaubrecht, 2010)

Synonyms
- Madagasikara zazavavindrano Köhler & Glaubrecht, 2010 (original combination)

Species of gastropod

Pirena zazavavindrano is a species of gastropods belonging to the family Pachychilidae. It is found in Madagascar, and according to the IUCN has the status of "critically endangered".
