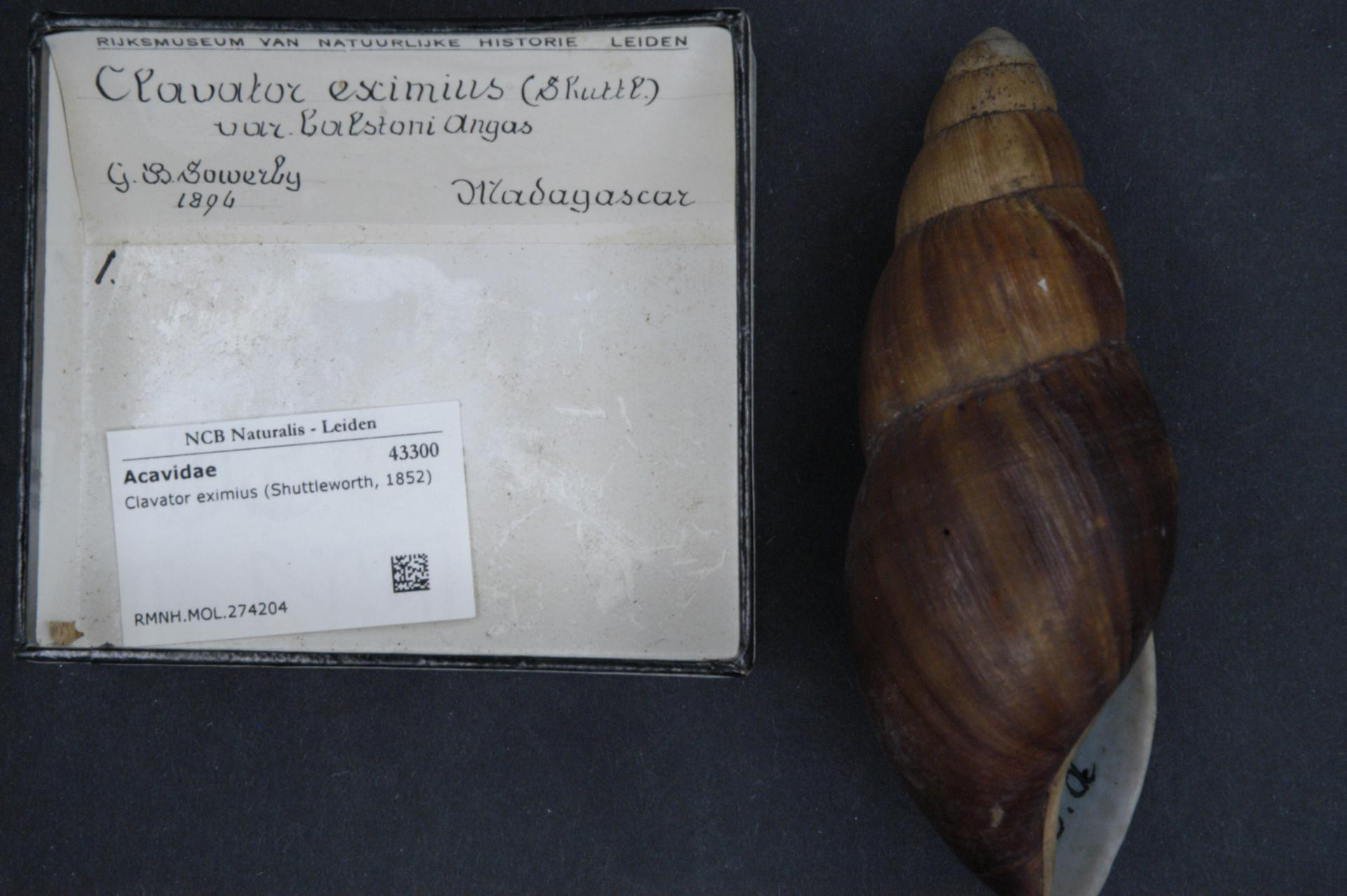
- Clavator eximius (Shuttleworth, 1852)

Scientific classification
- Kingdom: Animalia
- Phylum: Mollusca
- Class: Gastropoda
- Order: Stylommatophora
- Superfamily: Rhytidoidea
- Family: Clavatoridae; Thiele, 1926

= Clavatoridae =

Family of land snails

Clavatoridae is a family of air-breathing land snails, terrestrial pulmonate gastropod mollusks in the superfamily Rhytidoidea.

== Anatomy ==
They are characterized by slender, high-spired shells without apertural teeth and with a closed or narrowly chinked umbilicus and their sizes typically range from 26 to 113 mm depeding on species.

The jaw is composed of many narrow, tightly fused plaits, indicating adaptation to a herbivorous diet.

They are hermaphroditic, the male genitalia feature a very long, coiled epiphallus with a short flagellum, a short penis with strong longitudinal pilasters and a long penial caecum bearing the retractor muscle. The vas deferens inserts terminally and remains free from the penis. The female system lacks vaginal and the spermathecal duct is long with a large reservoir.

These are among the largest land snails in Madagascar, being typically larger than the Acavidae's genera.

== Distribution ==
The geographic isolation of Clavatoridae genera is endemic to Madagascar.

== Etymology ==
The name of the family Clavatoridae is originated from the genus Clavator E. von Martens, 1860.

Clavator is Latin for "club-bearer," from clava (club), likely referring to the shell's club-like shape. The suffix -idae denotes a zoological family, as per ICZN rules.

== Taxonomy ==
The family Clavatoridae was historically treated as a family within the superfamily Acavoidea due to morphological similarities.

Johannes Thiele (1931) considered that the Stirps Acavacea (informal historical grouping) contained six families:

- Clavatoridae (Madagascar)
- Dorcasiidae (South Africa)
- Acavidae (Sri Lanka, Seychelles, Madagascar)
- Caryodidae (Australia)
- Strophocheilidae (South America)
- Macrocyclidae (Chile)

Thiele's Clavatoridae were placed into the Acavidae s.s. following the studies of Kenneth C. Emberton (1995) who demonstrated with cladistic analysis that different groups of Clavator are embedded in Helicophanta s.l.. Emberton's results of phylogenetic analysis were applied to systematic concept and altered the nomenclature according to findings and conchological approach.

Emberton regarded the genus Clavator as being paraphyletic. It comprises a minimum of three species-groups, which share conchological, as well as ecological and zoogeographical characteristics.

Subsequently, he placed them here in 3 conchologically well defined genera and subgenera:

- Clavator - s.s.
- Clavator (Cylindroclavator) - n. subgen.
- Paraclavator - n. gen.

However, molecular phylogenetic analyses using mitochondrial and DNA markers have demonstrated that Clavator and aligned genera constitute a monophyletic clade that is phylogenetically distinct from Acavidae due to their unique shell characteristics, reproductive anatomy and geographic distribution.

This view was revised by Anatoly Alexeevich Schileyko (1999), who elevated Clavatoridae again to family status based on detailed anatomical differences, especially in reproductive structures.

The genera Clavator and Paraclavator showed a conchological resemblance to the southern American genus Obeliscus Beck, 1837 of the family Subulinidae. As a consequence, the name "Obeliscus" was used in error for these Malagasy molluscs.

Collections made in 2007 were intended to be used to initiate phylogenetic and biogeographic studies on Madagascan acavids, to be based primarily on DNA sequences and genital anatomies, therefore Paraclavator is currently listed (previously classified in Acavidae, but currently placed in Clavatoridae).

Leucotaenius, originally described by Eduard Von Martens in 1860, was also initially placed in the families Acavidae or Achatinidae based on conchological features such as its large, elongate shell.

However, subsequent anatomical investigations, particularly those by Schileyko (1999), revealed that Leucotaenius shares key reproductive and jaw characteristics with the genera Clavator and Paraclavator.

The new species described in the book bring Madagascar’s total described rhytidoids to 135 species:

- Acavidae: 114 species;
- Clavatoridae: 20 species;
- Rhytididae: 1 species.

The current following classification was subsequently adopted by Bouchet et al. (2017) published in Malacologia:

- Clavator E. von Martens, 1860;
- Leucotaenius E. von Martens, 1860;
- Paraclavator Groh & Poppe, 2002.

Clavatoridae does not have any recognized subfamilies.
