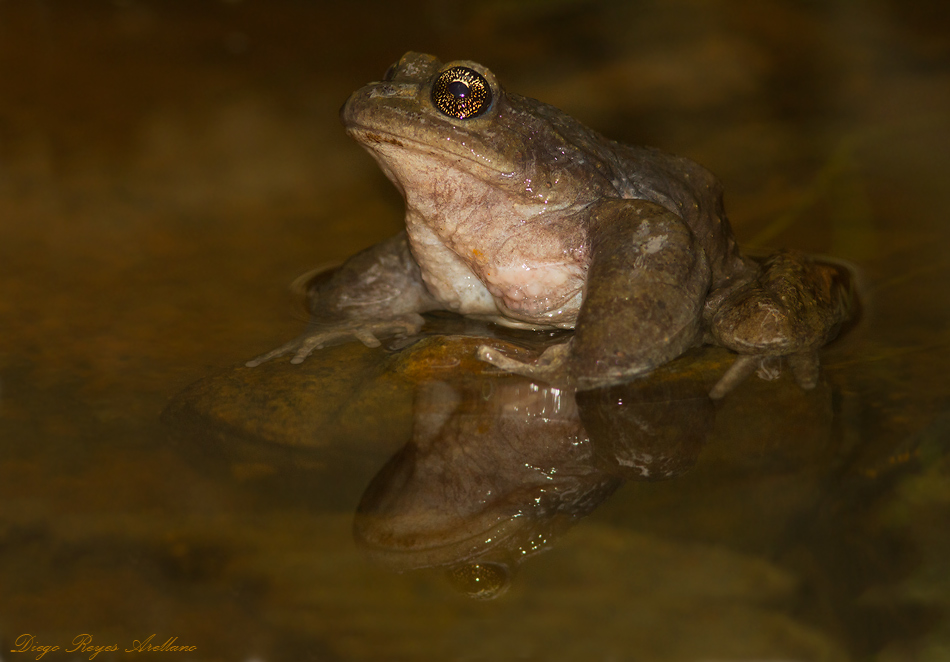

Conservation status
- Near Threatened (IUCN 3.1)

Scientific classification
- Kingdom: Animalia
- Phylum: Chordata
- Class: Amphibia
- Order: Anura
- Family: Alsodidae
- Genus: Alsodes
- Species: A. nodosus

Binomial name
- Alsodes nodosus (Duméril & Bibron, 1841)

Synonyms
- Borborocoetes kriegi Müller, 1926; Borborocoetus valdivianus Philippi, 1902; Cacotus maculatus Günther, 1869 "1868"; Cystignathus cinerascens Philippi, 1902; Cystignathus granulatus Philippi, 1902; Cystignathus zebra Philippi, 1902; Paludicola illotus Barbour, 1922; Paludicola muelleri Werner, 1896; Telmatobius laevis Philippi, 1902; Alsodes laevis (Philippi, 1902)

= Alsodes nodosus =

Species of frog

Alsodes nodosus (common name: black spiny-chest frog) is a species of frog in the family Alsodidae endemic to central Chile; records from Argentina are not considered valid.

== Habitat ==
Scientists observed this frog places streams in shrubland between 150 and 1900 meters above sea level.

Scientists have observed this frog inside protected parks Cerro La Campana National Park, Río Clarillo National Reserve, and Roblería del Cobre de Loncha National Reserve.

== Threats ==
Scientists from the IUCN and from the government of Chile classify this frog as near threatened. Principal threats include habitat loss associated with urbanization, agriculture, and logging. Introduced fish and larger frogs may also prey on Alsodes nodosus.

== Original description ==
- Duméril, A. M. C.; G. Bibron (1841). "Erpétologie Genérale ou Histoire Naturelle Complète des Reptiles". Paris: Librarie Enclyclopedique de Roret. 6.
