= Alsodes montanus =

Conservation status
- Vulnerable (IUCN 3.1)

Scientific classification
- Kingdom: Animalia
- Phylum: Chordata
- Class: Amphibia
- Order: Anura
- Family: Alsodidae
- Genus: Alsodes
- Species: A. montanus

Binomial name
- Alsodes montanus (Lataste, 1902)

Species of amphibian

Alsodes montanus is a species of frog in the family Alsodidae found in Chile and possibly Argentina.

== Habitat ==
This frog has been observed under stones near mountain streams. It spends almost all of its time in the water. Scientists have observed the frog between 1300 and 2600 meters above sea level.

Scientists have found the frog in three protected places: Alto Huemules, Río Clarillo, and Río Cipreses.

== Threats ==
The IUCN classifies this frog as vulnerable to extinction. In its northern range, the construction of a ski resort caused habitat loss with corresponding pollution and other problems. In the southern part of its range, planned hydroelectric dams may have caused other problems.

== Original publication ==
- Lataste in Philippi, R. A. (1902). "Suplemento a los Batraquios Chilenos Descritos en la Historia Física i Política de Chile de don Claudio Gay". Santiago de Chile: Libreria Alemana de Jose Ivens.
