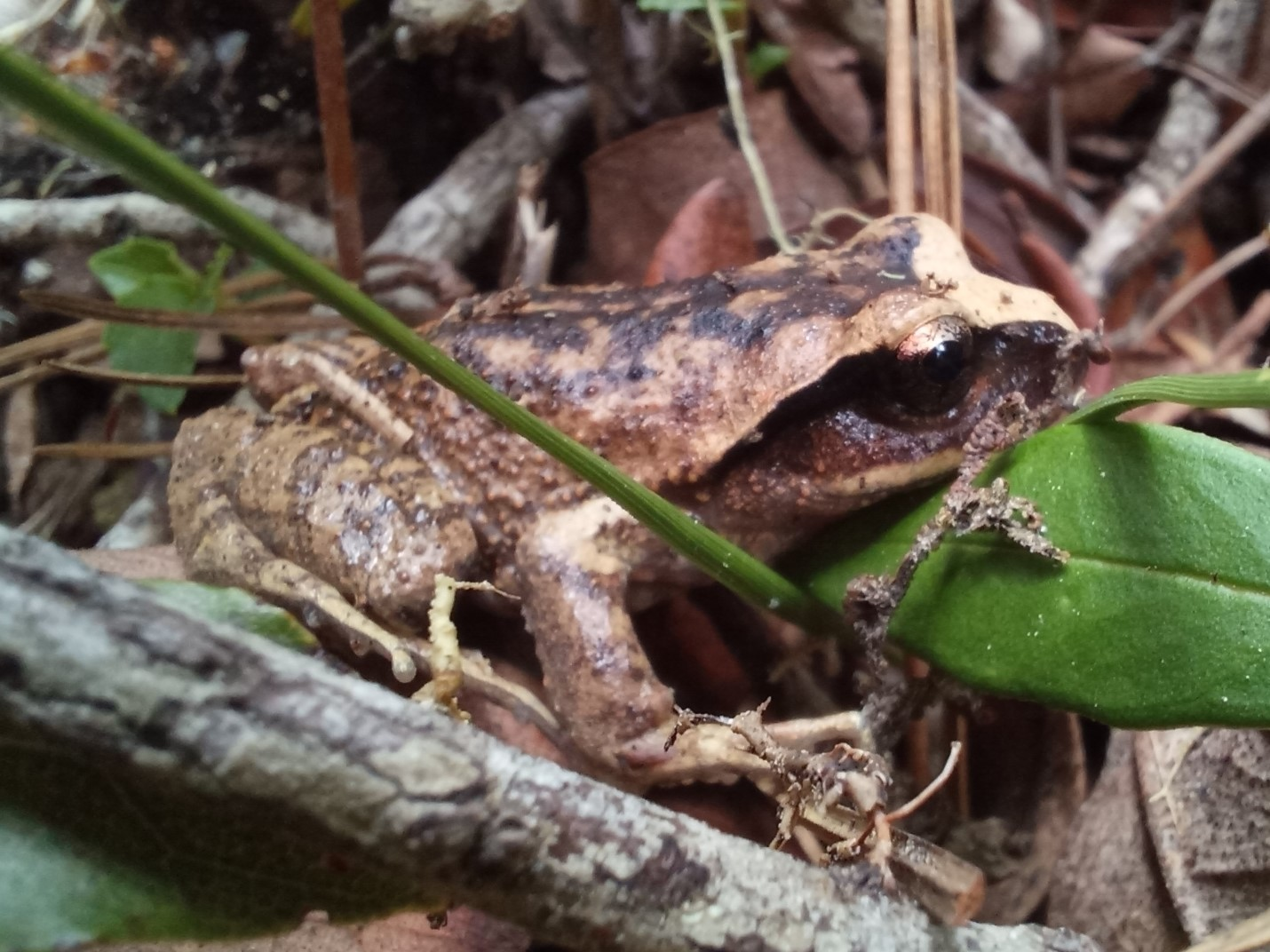

Conservation status
- Endangered (IUCN 3.1)

Scientific classification
- Kingdom: Animalia
- Phylum: Chordata
- Class: Amphibia
- Order: Anura
- Family: Alsodidae
- Genus: Alsodes
- Species: A. vanzolinii

Binomial name
- Alsodes vanzolinii (Donoso-Barros, 1974)

Synonyms
- Eupsophus vanzolinii Donoso-Barros, 1974

= Alsodes vanzolinii =

Species of frog

Alsodes vanzolinii is a species of frog in the family Alsodidae.

== Taxonomy ==
The first description of the species was published in 1974 by Roberto Donoso-Barros, who placed the species in the genus Eupsophus; it was moved to Alsodes in 1981 by J. Ramón Formas. The specific name vanzolinii honors Paulo Vanzolini, a Brazilian herpetologist and composer. The holotype, a male, was collected on the western slopes of the Nahuelbuta Range by Donoso-Barros in November 1971, at an elevation of about 100 m (330 ft), with the type locality given as Ramadillas, Arauco, Chile.

== Description ==
The adult male frog measures 36.4 – 52.2 mm in snout-vent length and the adult female frog 42.7 – 54.4 mm. The skin of the dorsum is brown in color. There is a yellow triangle on the head. There is dark color between the eyes and nostrils, and the nostrils are dark in color. There are dark stripes on all four legs. Adult frogs' bellies are white in color but young frogs' bellies are darker in color. The young frogs also have white spots, as adults do.

== Geographic range ==
A. vanzolinii is endemic to the western slopes of the Nahuelbuta Range, Arauco Province, Chile.

== Life cycle ==
The eggs are yellow in color and about 2.33 mm in diameter. The tadpoles swim in pools in streams.

== Habitat ==
The natural habitats of A. vanzolinii are temperate forests and rivers.

== Conservation status ==
A. vanzolinii is threatened by habitat loss. Alsodes vanzolinii is one of the 18 Alsodes species, 16 of which are present in Chile. Currently, they are considered a critically endangered species by the IUCN (2010) and one of the most threatened Chilean anuran species due to the habitat destruction and expanding exotic tree plantations. It is necessary to increase survey efforts of new populations and how plantation managements, like herbicides and fertilisers are affecting them.
