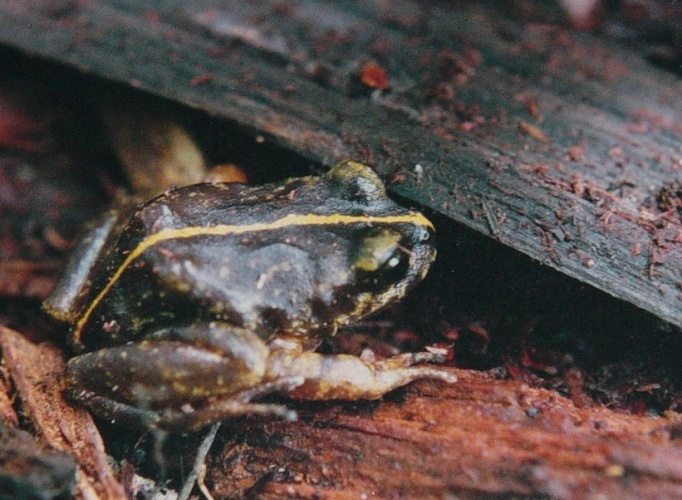

Conservation status
- Least Concern (IUCN 3.1)

Scientific classification
- Kingdom: Animalia
- Phylum: Chordata
- Class: Amphibia
- Order: Anura
- Family: Alsodidae
- Genus: Eupsophus
- Species: E. emiliopugini

Binomial name
- Eupsophus emiliopugini Formas, 1989

= Eupsophus emiliopugini =

Species of frog

Eupsophus emiliopugini is a species of frog in the family Alsodidae. It is found in the temperate Nothofagus forests of Chile between 40°50'S and 45°20'S, and in the Lago Puelo National Park, Chubut Province, Argentina. The specific name emiliopugini honors Professor Emilio Pugín, for "his contribution to knowledge of the reproductive biology and development of the Chilean frogs". Common name Emilio's ground frog has been coined for the species.

== Description ==
Adult males measure 43–50 mm (1.7–2.0 in) and females 41–65 mm (1.6–2.6 in) in snout–vent length. Newly metamorphosed froglets measure 10–11 mm (0.39–0.43 in).

The head is wider than it is long. The tympanum is distinct, and there is a well-developed supra-tympanic fold. The limbs are slender. Webbing is absent. Skin is smooth. The dorsal ground color is grayish brown to leaden. There is a lemon-yellow vertebral line and an olive-green band between the eyes. Sometimes there are bright yellowish reticulations on the thighs. The belly is whitish; mature males have bright orange gular area.

== Habitat and conservation ==
Its natural habitats are humid forests near cold streams from near sea level to 1,500 m (4,900 ft) above sea level. Adults can be found under logs or in small holes at the edges of streams. Males call from small holes at day. Females lay their eggs inside the holes; the free-swimming tadpoles develop in these water-filled cavities on the ground. The tadpoles spend considerable time in the nest, during which they do not eat. Scientists suspect parental care.

It is threatened by habitat loss caused by fires and plantation of exotic trees for forestry. It occurs in the Lago Puelo National Park in Argentina and at least six other protected parks in Chile.
