= Alsodes vittatus =

Conservation status
- Data Deficient (IUCN 3.1)

Scientific classification
- Kingdom: Animalia
- Phylum: Chordata
- Class: Amphibia
- Order: Anura
- Family: Alsodidae
- Genus: Alsodes
- Species: A. vittatus

Binomial name
- Alsodes vittatus (Philippi, 1902)

Species of frog

Alsodes vittatus is a species of frog in the family Alsodidae. It is endemic to Chile and only known from its type locality, San Ignacio de Pemehue, Malleco Province. It may be threatened by habitat loss through the conversion of forest to pine plantations, and it is not known from any protected areas. Scientists have seen it between 1000 and 1610 meters above sea level.

The species was collected in 1893 by the French entomologist Philibert Germain, with three specimens later given to Rodolfo Amando Philippi, who described the species as Cystignathus vittatus. No new specimens were sighted for 130 years, until an expedition by Chilean researchers Claudio Correa Quezada and Edvin Riveros Riffo reported two populations located at the headwaters of the Lolco and Portales river basins in 2024.

== Original description ==
- Philippi, R. A. (1902). "Suplemento a los Batraquios Chilenos Descritos en la Historia Física i Política de Chile de don Claudio Gay". Santiago de Chile: Libreria Alemana de Jose Ivens.
