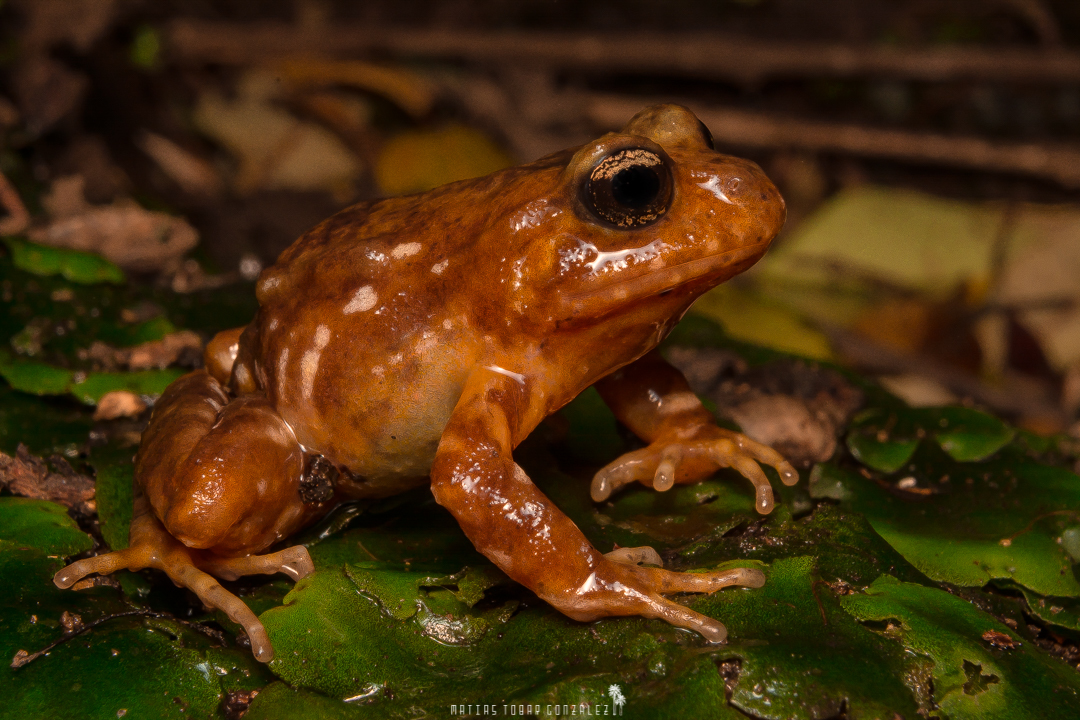

Conservation status
- Critically Endangered (IUCN 3.1)

Scientific classification
- Kingdom: Animalia
- Phylum: Chordata
- Class: Amphibia
- Order: Anura
- Family: Alsodidae
- Genus: Eupsophus
- Species: E. insularis

Binomial name
- Eupsophus insularis (Philippi, 1902)

= Eupsophus insularis =

Species of amphibian

Eupsophus insularis is a critically endangered species of frog in the family Alsodidae. It is endemic to Mocha Island in Chile and the nearby mainland, where found in temperate mixed forest.

== Habitat ==
This frog lives in forests with notable humidity. People find these frogs under logs. Scientists saw this frog between 20 and 250 meters above sea level.

Much of this frog population lives inside a single protected park: Isla Mocha Reserve.

== Reproduction ==
The female frog lays eggs in small water-filled holes on hillsides. The tadpoles are endotrophic.

== Threats ==
The IUCN classifies this frog as critically endangered. The principal threat is habitat loss associated with livestock cultivation and firewood collection. Firewood collection is only legal at a few sites on Mocha Island, but the laws have proven difficult to enforce. Rats and feral dogs may prey upon this frog. Scientists note that cats have been introduced to the island, but they have not confirmed whether they affect this frog.

== Original description ==
- Philippi, R. A. (1902). "Suplemento a los Batraquios Chilenos Descritos en la Historia Física i Política de Chile de don Claudio Gay". Santiago de Chile: Libreria Alemana de Jose Ivens.
