= Eupsophus altor =

Conservation status
- Endangered (IUCN 3.1)

Scientific classification
- Kingdom: Animalia
- Phylum: Chordata
- Class: Amphibia
- Order: Anura
- Family: Alsodidae
- Genus: Eupsophus
- Species: E. altor

Binomial name
- Eupsophus altor Nuñez, Rabanal, and Formas, 2012

Species of frog

Eupsophus altor, or Oncol's ground frog, is a species of frog in the family Alsodidae. It is endemic to Chile.

== Habitat ==
This frog lives in Valdivian rainforests. This frog has been found under rotting logs or walking among vegetation at night. Scientists observed this frog between 42 and 650 meters above sea level.

Scientists have seen this frog in some protected places associated with Forestal Arauco.

== Reproduction ==
Scientists observed egg clutches and tadpoles from May to September, and tadpoles as late as October. The tadpoles develop in terrestrial nests on theground, under logs, or in water-filled holes in trees.

== Threats ==
The IUCN classifies this frog as endangered. The principal threat is habitat loss, but it has a different cause in each location: agriculture, sylviculture for pine and eucalyptus, sheep farming, mink farming, housing, and tourism.
