= Eupsophus septentrionalis =

Conservation status
- Endangered (IUCN 3.1)

Scientific classification
- Kingdom: Animalia
- Phylum: Chordata
- Class: Amphibia
- Order: Anura
- Family: Alsodidae
- Genus: Eupsophus
- Species: E. septentrionalis

Binomial name
- Eupsophus septentrionalis Ibarra-Vidal, Ortiz, and Torres-Pérez, 2004

Synonyms
- Eupsophus queulensis Veloso, Celis-Diez, Guerrero, Méndez-Torres, Iturra-Constant, and Simonetti, 2005

Species of frog

Eupsophus septentrionalis is a species of frog in the family Alsodidae. It is endemic to Chile.

== Habitat ==
This frog is found in fragments of forest with Nothofagus obliqua and Nothofagus glauca growing. People find them on the leaf litter, under logs, and near streams. Scientists observed this frog between 100 and 450 meters above sea level.

Scientists observed the frog in Reserva Nacional Los Ruiles and Reserva Nacional Los Queules.

== Reproduction ==
The female frog lays about 200 eggs per clutch. Scientists observed male and female adult frogs near holes in the dirt near streams. The holes contained eggs or tadpoles. The tadpoles, which are endotrophic, are dragged to streams, where they develop.

== Threats ==
The IUCN classifies this frog as endangered. Principal threats are habitat fragmentation caused by wood collection and silviculture, such as pine and eucalyptus plantations.
