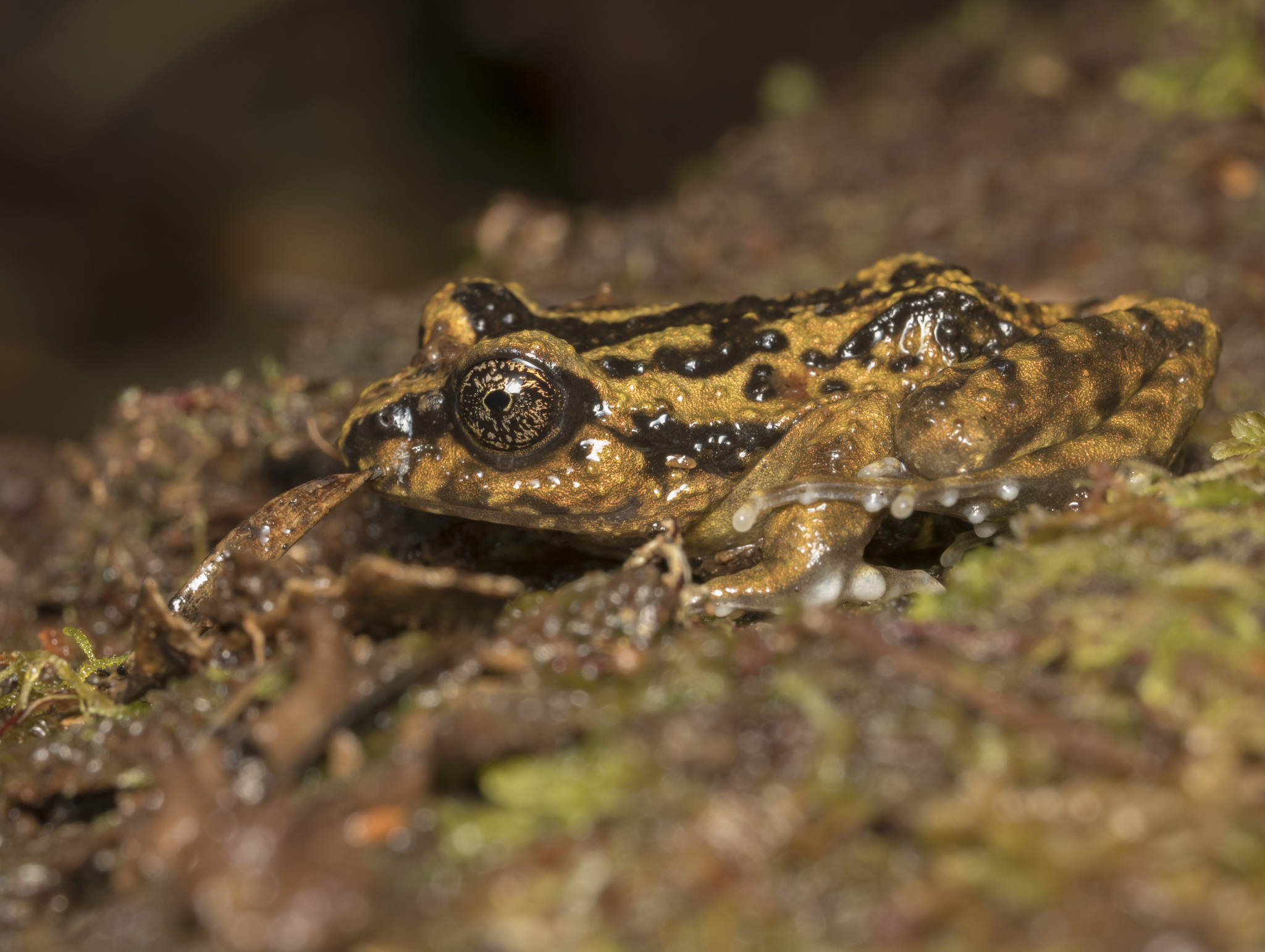

Conservation status
- Endangered (IUCN 3.1)

Scientific classification
- Kingdom: Animalia
- Phylum: Chordata
- Class: Amphibia
- Order: Anura
- Family: Alsodidae
- Genus: Alsodes
- Species: A. norae

Binomial name
- Alsodes norae Cuevas, 2008

= Alsodes norae =

Species of frog

Alsodes norae is a species of frog in the family Alsodidae endemic to the Chilean Coast Range in the Valdivia Province, Chile. It is only known from the type series collected from a temperate Nothofagus forest. The threats are not formally known but it may be ongoing deforestation, however, the species may be protected by Oncol Park.

== Description ==
The adult frog measures 30.6–61.4 mm in snout-vent length. The dorsal surfaces of the head and all four legs are bright yellow and black in color. There is a yellow triangle on the head between the eyes and snout. There is a mark on the dorsum in the shape of a bat with open wings. There are bars on the back legs. The undersides of the thighs are yellow. The belly is beige with dark reticulations. The top of the iris of the eye is gold or yellow-bronze in color with black reticulations.

== Habitat ==
This frog lives in Nothofagus forests with significant humidity. People find them under fallen logs.

Scientists have seen this frog between 400 and 700 meters above sea level. Scientists saw this frog within one protected place: Parque Oncol, which is a private park. They also saw it near an ecological reserve in Llenehue and they believe it may live in this park too.

== Young ==
Scientists believe this frog breeds through larval development like other frogs in Alsodes.

== Threats ==
The IUCN classifies this frog as endangered. There is notable deforestation and construction in some parts of its range.
