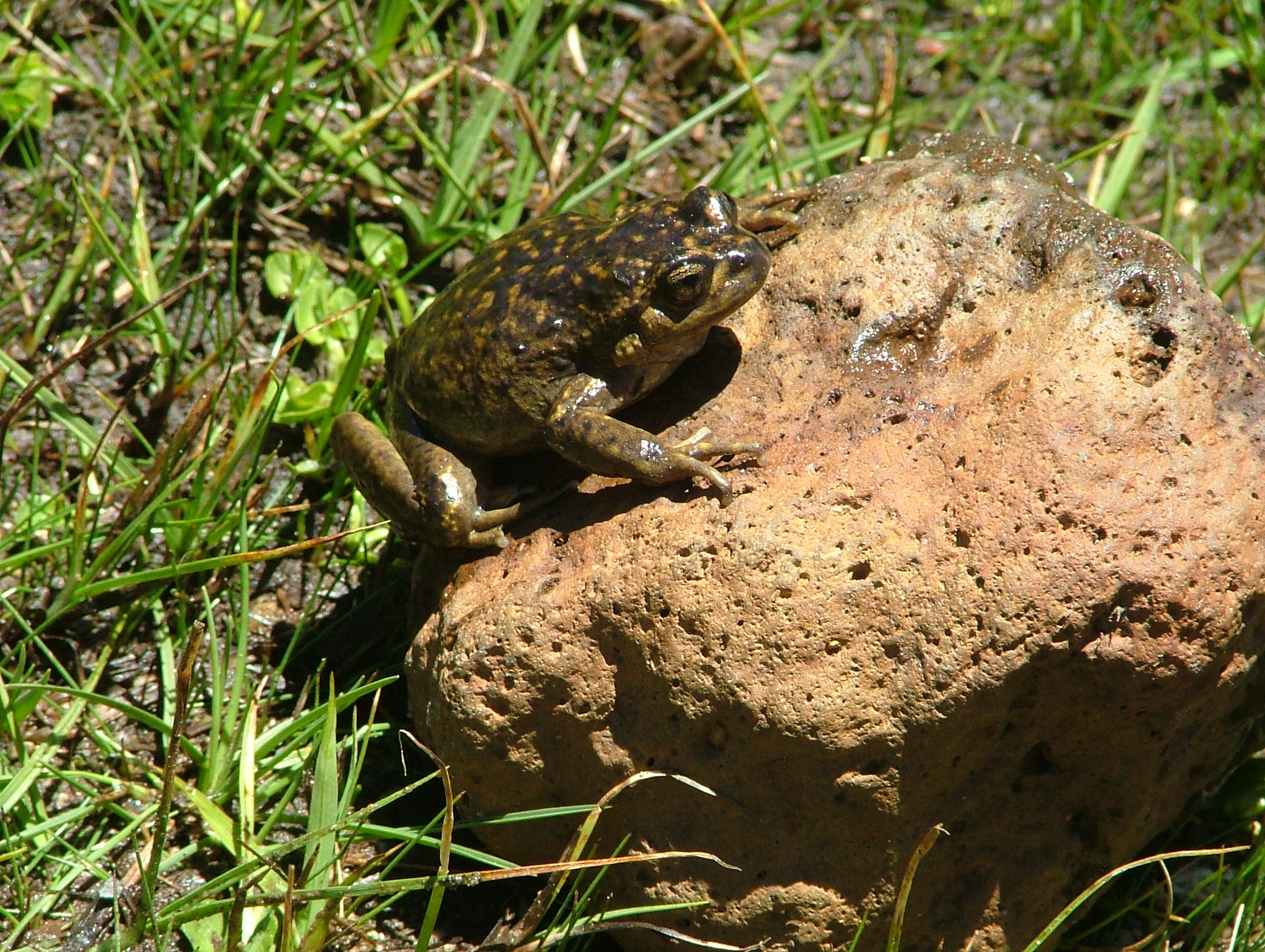

Conservation status
- Critically Endangered (IUCN 3.1)

Scientific classification
- Kingdom: Animalia
- Phylum: Chordata
- Class: Amphibia
- Order: Anura
- Family: Alsodidae
- Genus: Alsodes
- Species: A. pehuenche

Binomial name
- Alsodes pehuenche Cei, 1976

= Alsodes pehuenche =

Species of frog

Alsodes pehuenche (common name: Pehuenche spiny-chest frog) is a species of frog in the family Alsodidae. It is endemic to Pehuenche Valley in the Andes of southern Mendoza Province, Argentina, and the adjacent Chile. At the time of the assessment by the International Union for Conservation of Nature (IUCN) in 2012 (published 2013), the species was known from six streams (five in Argentina and one in Chile) in an area encompassing some 9 km^{2}. A study published in 2013 extended the known range a few kilometers west and included another Chilean stream.

== Habitat ==
Alsodes pehuenche is an aquatic frog. It is found primarily in galleries inside small permanent snowmelt streams with stony banks, covered by herbaceous vegetation; it can also be found in ponds and swamps derived from snowmelt. The altitude of its habitat is between 2,000–2,523 m (6,562–8,278 ft) asl.

== Description ==
Males in two Chilean locations measured on average 51 mm (2.0 in) and females 50.4 mm (1.98 in) in snout–vent length. The body is bulky and extremities are robust. The head is wide with snout that is short and rounded. The dorsal coloration is light brown with diffuse, irregular, darker blotches. There are sometimes dispersed yellowish blotches that are more frequent in females.

== Life cycle ==
This frog has very slow development: time to metamorphosis is estimated to be at least four winters.

== Conservation status ==
The streams A. pehuenche inhabits are impacted by paving the highway in their catchment. This has already impacted the hydrology and it may affect water quality, particularly because of salting of the highway in winter. Additional threats are waste from tourists and tramping by livestock. Considering these threats and the very limited area of occurrence, the Amphibian Specialist Group of the International Union for Conservation of Nature (IUCN) has classified this species as critically endangered.

Climate change could also harm this frog by changing the water ecology. Because the frog spends years as a tadpole, a severe change in the water environment could wipe out multiple generations of this animal at once.
