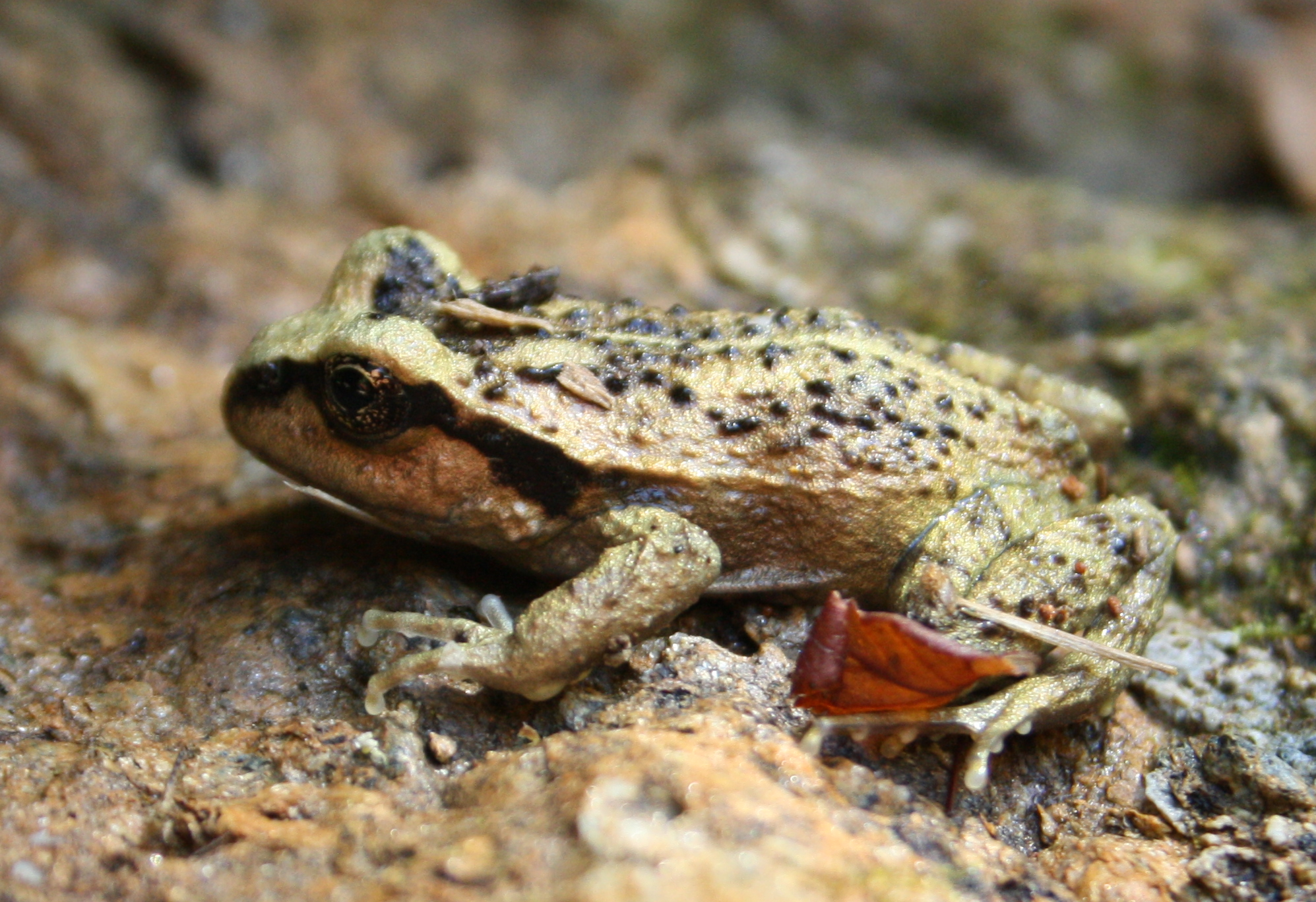

Conservation status
- Endangered (IUCN 3.1)

Scientific classification
- Kingdom: Animalia
- Phylum: Chordata
- Class: Amphibia
- Order: Anura
- Family: Alsodidae
- Genus: Alsodes
- Species: A. valdiviensis

Binomial name
- Alsodes valdiviensis Formas, Cuevas, and Brieva, 2002

= Alsodes valdiviensis =

Species of amphibian

Alsodes valdiviensis is a species of frogs in the family Alsodidae. It is endemic to Chile and only known from its type locality, Cerro Mirador in the Cordillera Pelada, Valdivia Province. The specific name refers to this province.

Alsodes valdiviensis is only known from the Cerro Mirador in the Cordillera Pelada, Chile

== Description ==
Adult males measure 40–60 mm (1.6–2.4 in) and adult females 40–63 mm (1.6–2.5 in) in snout–vent length. The body is robust with well-developed arms and legs. The snout is strongly truncated in dorsal profile. No tympanum is present. The fingers are long with globular tips and lack webbing. The toes are long, thin, and fringed. Dorsal surfaces and the limbs are light brown with golden tints. Skin on the flanks and dorsal surface is granular. The venter and throat are whitish. The iris is black and has bronze reticulations.

== Habitat and conservation ==
Alsodes valdiviensis is known from temperate Nothofagus and Fitzroya forests and bogs at 1,100 m (3,600 ft) above sea level. Adult males have been found under logs at the border of the forest in spring and summer. Breeding takes place in cold fast-moving streams. Threats to it are unknown, and it is not known from any protected area.
