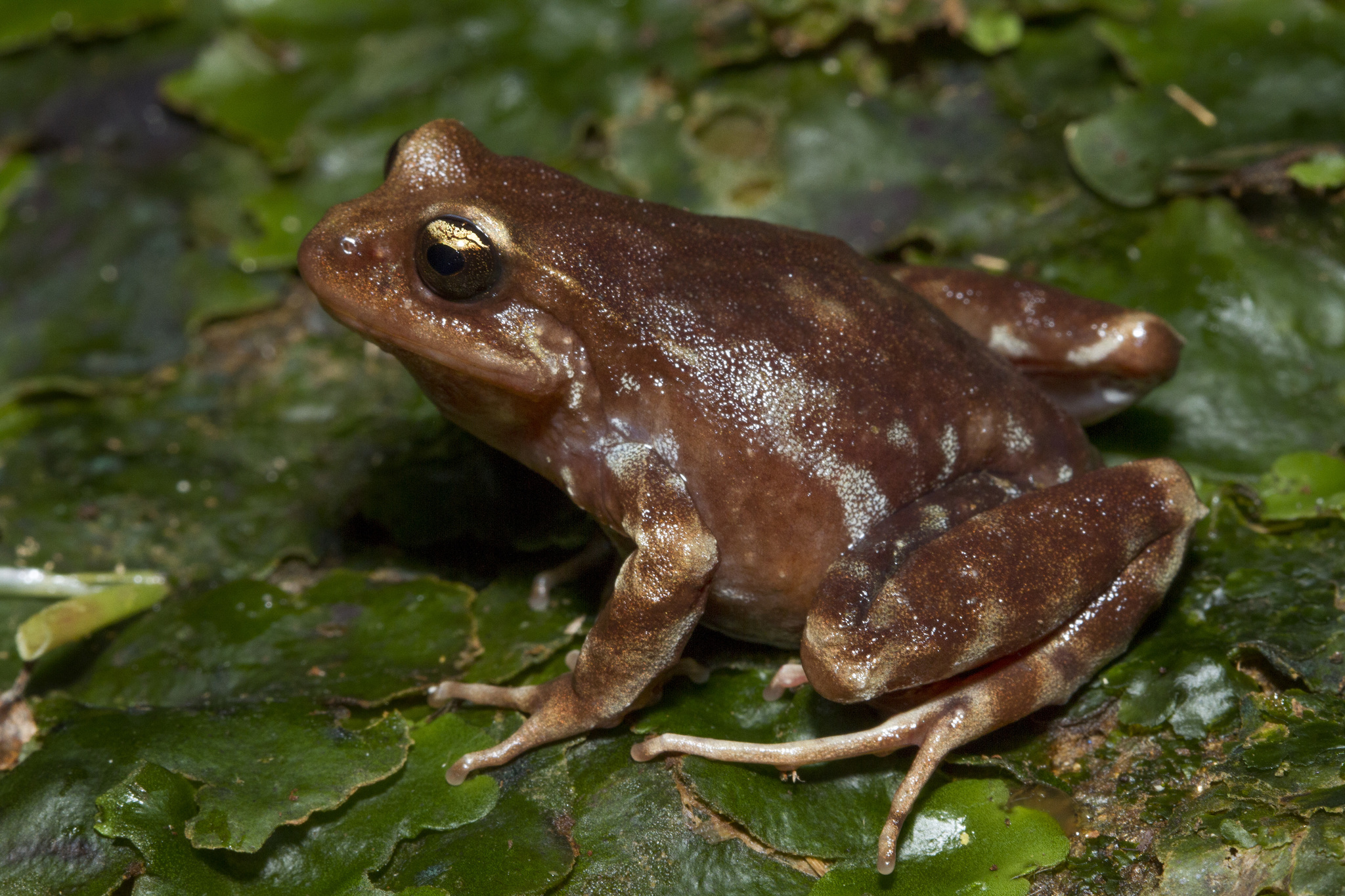
- In Chile

Conservation status
- Endangered (IUCN 3.1)

Scientific classification
- Kingdom: Animalia
- Phylum: Chordata
- Class: Amphibia
- Order: Anura
- Family: Alsodidae
- Genus: Eupsophus
- Species: E. migueli

Binomial name
- Eupsophus migueli Formas, 1978

= Eupsophus migueli =

Species of frog

Eupsophus migueli is a species of frog in the family Alsodidae. It is endemic to Chile.

== Description ==
Adult frogs of both sexes measure 33.5 to 42.0 mm in snout-vent length. Individuals may differ in coloration. For the most part, the skin of the dorsum is red-brown or pink in color. The flanks are white with yellow color in the axilliary and inguinal regions. The belly is white in color. There are light gray spots on the back. There are light gray bracelets near the ends of the legs. The iris if the eye is yellow in color with black lines.

== Habitat ==
This frog is found under logs near streams in Nothofagus forests. It can also be found in small patches of rainforest or on pine tree plantations if they have sufficient smaller plants. Scientists saw this frog between 30 and 650 meters above sea level.

== Reproduction ==
The adult female frog lays eggs in holes on the sides of hills. The tadpoles are 18.4–19.6 mm long in total. The tadpoles do not have any pigmentation in their bodies or tails.

== Danger ==
Scientists from the IUCN say this frog is in danger of dying out. People change the places where the frog lives to make towns, places for visitors, and farms, for example pine and eucalyptus tree farms. People also change the forest to make places to raise mink and sheep. Fires and too many visitors to the frog's home can also cause problems.

== Original description ==
- Formas, R. (1978). "A new species of leptodactylid frog (Eupsophus) from the coastal range in Southern Chile.". Studies on Neotropical Fauna and Environment. 13: 1–9.
