= Alsodes coppingeri =

Conservation status
- Data Deficient (IUCN 3.1)

Scientific classification
- Kingdom: Animalia
- Phylum: Chordata
- Class: Amphibia
- Order: Anura
- Family: Alsodidae
- Genus: Alsodes
- Species: A. coppingeri

Binomial name
- Alsodes coppingeri (Günther, 1881)

Synonyms
- Cacotus coppingeri Günther, 1881; Borborocoetes coppingeri Boulenger, 1882; Eupsophus coppingeri Capurro-S., 1958; Alsodes coppingeri Formas, Nuñez, and Cuevas, 2008,

Species of frog

Alsodes coppingeri is a species of frog in the family Alsodidae. It is native to Chile and Argentina.

== Habitat ==
This frog lives in temperate forests and tundra surrounded by with mountains. It has been seen in herbaceous plants, under rocks, and near streams between 0 and 300 meters above sea level.

This frog has been observed in one protected place: Bernardo O'Higgins National Park.

== Life cycle ==
This frog has a free-swimming larval stage.

== Threats ==
The IUCN classifies this frog as data deficient. Introduced American mink may prey on these frogs.

== Original description ==
- Formas JR; Nunez J; Cuevas C (2008). "Identidad de la rana austral chilena Eupsophus coppingeri (Amphibia, Anura, Neobatrachia): evidencias morfologicas, cromosomicas y moleculares". Revista Chilena de Historia Natural (Abstract) (in Spanish). 81: 3–20. doi:10.4067/S0716-078X2008000100001. ISSN 0716-078X.
