= Alsodes neuquensis =

Conservation status
- Endangered (IUCN 3.1)

Scientific classification
- Kingdom: Animalia
- Phylum: Chordata
- Class: Amphibia
- Order: Anura
- Family: Alsodidae
- Genus: Alsodes
- Species: A. neuquensis

Binomial name
- Alsodes neuquensis Cei, 1976

Synonyms
- Alsodes gargola neuquensis Cei, 1976

Species of frog

Alsodes neuquensis is a species of frog in the genus Alsodes. It is endemic to Argentina.

== Habitat ==
This frog has been found in alpine and mountainous lakes and in streams on high volcanic flatlands. It has shown some tolerance to habitat disturbance from cows and horses. Scientists have seen the frog between 1500 and 2100 meters above sea level.

This frog has been rocrded in two protected areas, Batea Mahuida Reserve and Copahue Reserve. Scientists think it may also live in Lanín National Park.

== Life cycle ==
This frog breeds in streams and ponds. It spends a long time in its larval stage, one or two years, before metamorphosing into a frog. Tadpoles from different year cohorts cohabitate.

== Threats ==
The IUCN classifies this frog as endangered. Volcanoes, firest, livestock, and introduced predators, such as trout, all threaten this frog or its habitat.
