= Eupsophus contulmoensis =

Conservation status
- Endangered (IUCN 3.1)

Scientific classification
- Kingdom: Animalia
- Phylum: Chordata
- Class: Amphibia
- Order: Anura
- Family: Alsodidae
- Genus: Eupsophus
- Species: E. contulmoensis

Binomial name
- Eupsophus contulmoensis Ortiz, Ibarra-Vidal, Formas, 1989

Species of frog

Eupsophus contulmoensis is a species of frog in the family Alsodidae. It is endemic to Chile.

== Habitat ==
This frog is found under logs and rocks in Nothofagus forests. Scientists observed this frog between 50 and 740 meters above sea level.

This frog has been found in one protected place: Contulmo National Monument.

== Reproduction ==
The female frog lays eggs in shallow holes.

== Threats ==
The IUCN classifies this frog as endangered. The principal threat is habitat loss in favor of pine and eucalyptus plantations. Human-set fires and tourism also cause problems.
