= Eupsophus nahuelbutensis =

Conservation status
- Endangered (IUCN 3.1)

Scientific classification
- Kingdom: Animalia
- Phylum: Chordata
- Class: Amphibia
- Order: Anura
- Family: Alsodidae
- Genus: Eupsophus
- Species: E. nahuelbutensis

Binomial name
- Eupsophus nahuelbutensis Ortiz, Ibarra-Vidal, 1992

Species of frog

Eupsophus nahuelbutensis is a species of frog in the family Alsodidae. It is endemic to Chile, where it is found in the Nahuelbuta range and in the Ramadillas.

== Habitat ==
This frog can be found logs in Nothofagus forests and pine forests, occasionally on the edges of eucalyptus tree farms. Scientists observed this frog between 100 and 1200 meters above sea level.

This frog has been found in one protected park, Nahuelbuta National Park.

== Reproduction ==
The adult female frog lays eggs in water-filled holes in the ground.

== Threats ==
The IUCN classifies this frog as endangered. Habitat loss from wood collection and tree farms is the principal threat. Human-set fires are another.
