= Ground frog (disambiguation) =

The ground frog (Eupsophus) is a genus of frogs in the family Alsodidae endemic to Patagonia.

Ground frog may also refer to:

- Australian ground frog, a family of frogs (Myobatrachidae) found in Australia and New Guinea
- Wrinkled ground frog (Platymantis), a genus of frogs in the family Ceratobatrachidae found in the Philippines, Palau, Fiji, New Guinea, and in the Admiralty, Bismarck, and Solomon Islands
