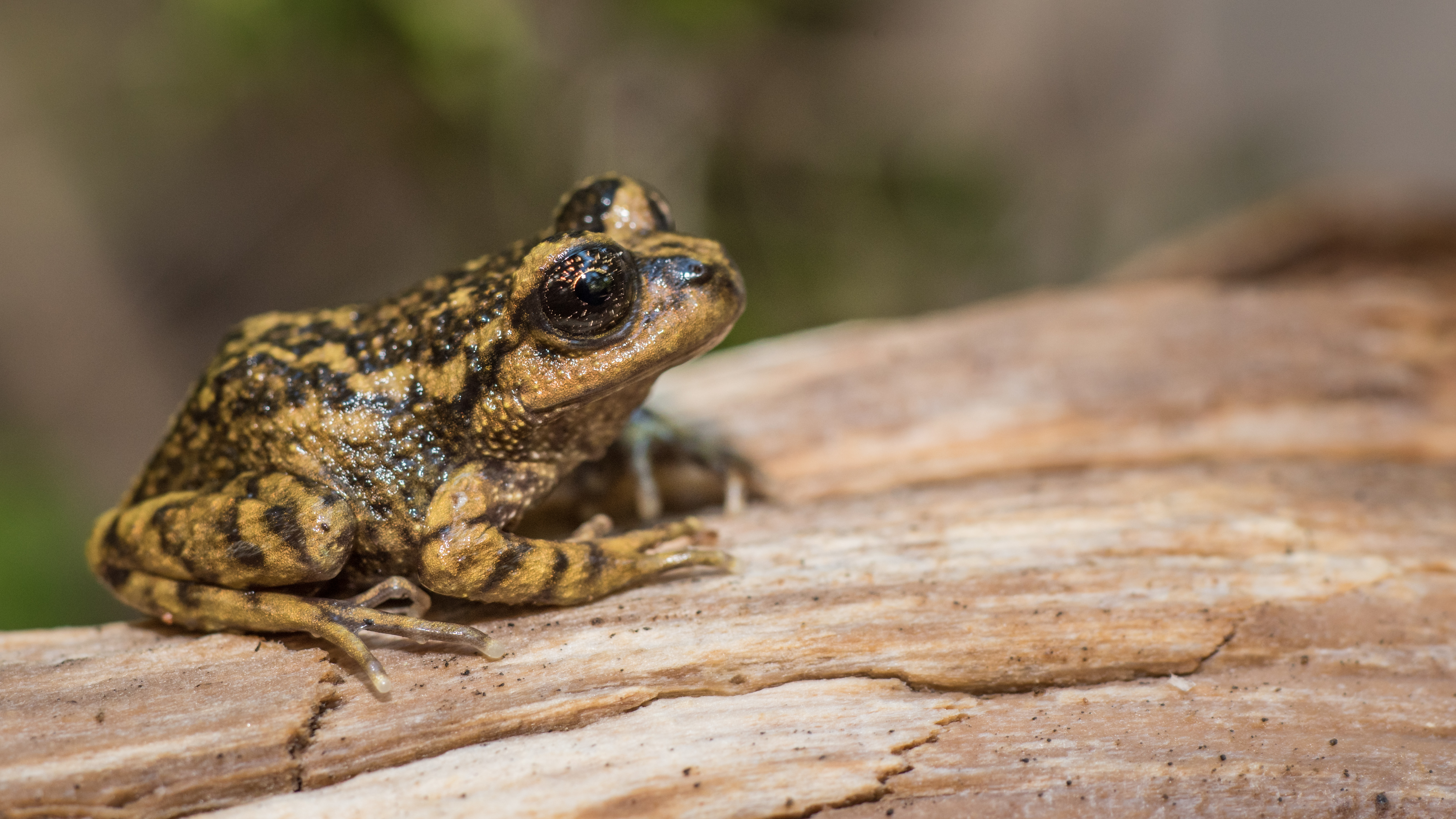

Conservation status
- Endangered (IUCN 3.1)

Scientific classification
- Kingdom: Animalia
- Phylum: Chordata
- Class: Amphibia
- Order: Anura
- Family: Alsodidae
- Genus: Alsodes
- Species: A. barrioi

Binomial name
- Alsodes barrioi Veloso, Díaz, Iturra, & Penna, 1981

= Alsodes barrioi =

Species of amphibian

Alsodes barrioi, the Cabreria spiny-chest frog, is a species of frog in the Alsodidae, endemic to Chile; it is only known from its type locality in the Cordillera de Nahuelbuta, Malleco Province. The specific name barrioi honors Avelino Barrio, a Spanish botanist and zoologist who lived in Argentina.

It is relatively abundant at the type locality. These frogs can be found under logs or stones close to mountain streams. The surrounding vegetation mainly comprises Nothofagus dombeyi and Araucaria araucana. Scientists observed the frogs between 500 and 1500 meters above sea level. The habitat is being afforested by introduced pines, and harvesting these would have dramatic consequences for the streams where these frogs breed.
