= Alsodes kaweshkari =

Conservation status
- Data Deficient (IUCN 3.1)

Scientific classification
- Kingdom: Animalia
- Phylum: Chordata
- Class: Amphibia
- Order: Anura
- Family: Alsodidae
- Genus: Alsodes
- Species: A. kaweshkari

Binomial name
- Alsodes kaweshkari Formas, Cuevas, and Nuñez, 1998

Species of frog

Alsodes kaweshkari is a species of frog in the family Alsodidae. This rare species is endemic to southern Chile where it is known from two specimens, the holotype that was collected from Puerto Edén (Wellington Island), and one paratype from Seno Huemules on the mainland.

The type locality of Alsodes kaweshkari is Puerto Edén in southern Chile. The only other locality it is known from is Seno Huemules, about 30 km north of Puerto Edén.

== Etymology ==
The specific name kaweshkari refers to Kaweshkar Indians, "brave people" and hunters of sea lions who live in Puerto Edén.

== Description ==
Both type specimens are males. They measure 56.5 and 62.2 mm (2.22 and 2.45 in) in snout–vent length (i.e., large in comparison to most other Alsodes). The body is robust. The flanks and dorsal surfaces are granular, as is the skin around vent and posterior thighs. The ventral skin is smooth with minute granules. The dorsum, arms, and legs are brown; the areas around nostrils, lips and, eyes are light brown. The iris has a coppery reticulum. Belly is whitish yellow. The tympanum is absent. The toes are fringed and have some webbing at their bases. The fingers are unwebbed. However, fingers have some spines in males—a secondary sex characteristic, as are the black patches of keratinous spines in the chest.

The holotype was destroyed by fire on 3 December 2007.

== Habitat and conservation ==
Both locations have small forests composed of Nothofagus betuloides, Embothrium coccineum, Maytenus magellanica, and Drimys winteri, surrounded by tundra. One specimen was collected under a log at the forest-tundra ecotone, the other by a small stream, both near the sea level (8–10 m (26–33 ft) asl).

The species was last seen in 1998 and expeditions in 2001 and 2002 in the same area failed to find it. The threats are unknown but it is known to occur in the Bernardo O'Higgins National Park.
