= A. australis =

A. australis may refer to:

An abbreviation of a species name. In binomial nomenclature the name of a species is always the name of the genus to which the species belongs, followed by the species name (also called the species epithet). In A. australis the genus name has been abbreviated to A. and the species has been spelled out in full. In a document that uses this abbreviation it should always be clear from the context which genus name has been abbreviated.

Some of the most common uses of A. australis are:

- Aedes australis, a New Zealand brackish water mosquito species
- Agathis australis, the kauri, a coniferous tree species found north of 38°S in the northern districts of New Zealand's North Island
- Alsodes australis, a frog species found in Argentina and Chile
- Amaranthus australis, the southern amaranth or southern water-hemp, a plant species found in many Southern states, Mexico, the West Indies and South America
- Anchitherium australis, a prehistoric horse species in the genus Anchitherium
- Androctonus australis, a fat-tailed scorpion species found throughout the semi-arid and arid regions of the Middle-East and Africa
- Apteryx australis, the Southern brown kiwi, tokoeka or common kiwi, a bird species from New Zealand's South Island
- Arctophoca australis, the South American fur seal, a fur seal species that breeds on the coasts of Chile and Argentina
- Asota australis, a moth species found in Australia, Indonesia and Papua New Guinea
- Austroplebeia australis, a stingless bee species endemic to Australia

== See also ==
- Australis (disambiguation)
