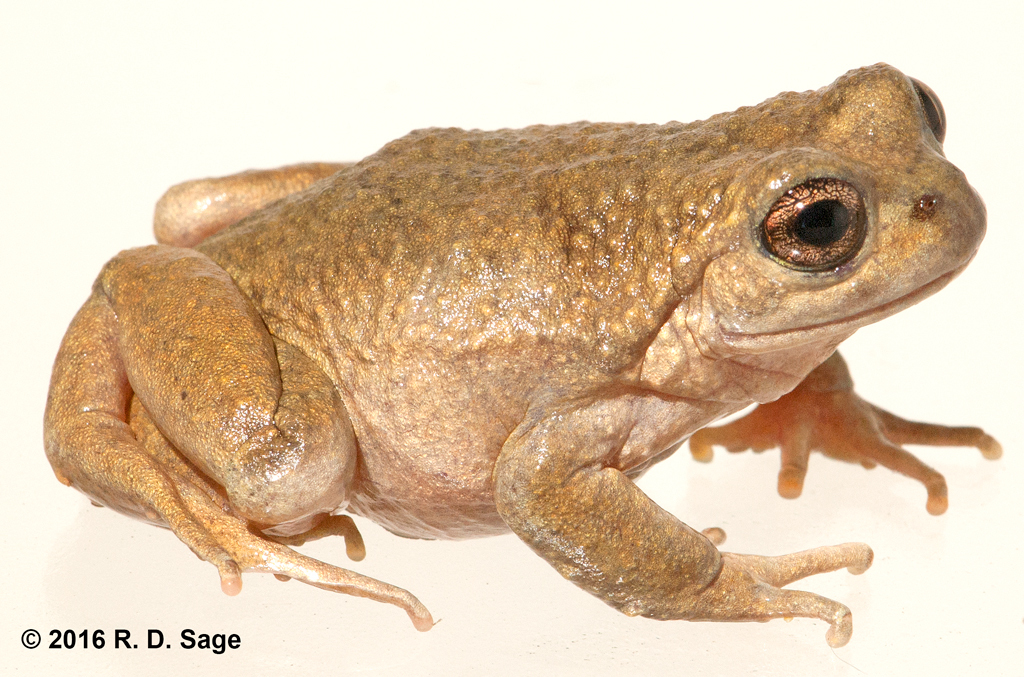

Conservation status
- Least Concern (IUCN 3.1)

Scientific classification
- Kingdom: Animalia
- Phylum: Chordata
- Class: Amphibia
- Order: Anura
- Family: Alsodidae
- Genus: Alsodes
- Species: A. gargola

Binomial name
- Alsodes gargola Gallardo, 1970

Synonyms
- Alsodes gargola ssp. neuquensis Cei, 1976

= Alsodes gargola =

Species of frog

Alsodes gargola, with the common name Tonchek spiny-chest frog, is a species of frog in the family Alsodidae. It is endemic to Argentina, where it occurs in northern Patagonia.

This species is a semi-aquatic frog living around alpine lakes and streams. It overwinters for 8 months of the year and the tadpoles overwinter beneath the ice and snow. The species is threatened by exotic trout, but the populations are probably not yet in decline. The frog has been seen in at least three protected areas: Nahuel Huapi National Park, Los Alerces National Park, and Lago Puelo National Park.

Alsodes gargola adults and tadpoles have the ability to tolerate and adapt to low conductivity water and extreme overwintering conditions indicating that it could have the highest tolerance to overwintering compared to other frogs.
