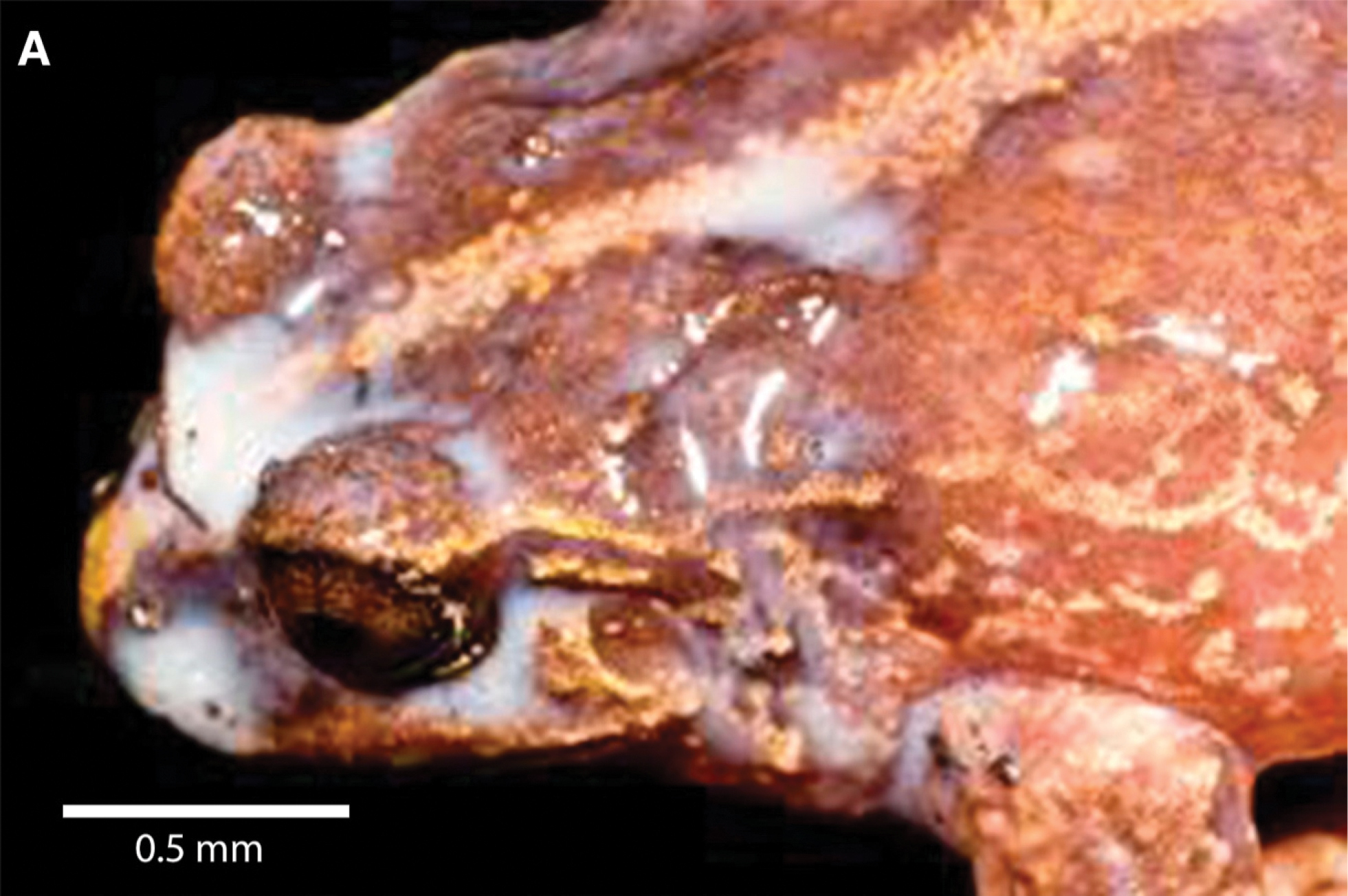
- Eupsophus vertebralis releasing a sticky secretion from its skin.

Conservation status
- Least Concern (IUCN 3.1)

Scientific classification
- Kingdom: Animalia
- Phylum: Chordata
- Class: Amphibia
- Order: Anura
- Family: Alsodidae
- Genus: Eupsophus
- Species: E. vertebralis

Binomial name
- Eupsophus vertebralis Grandison, 1961

= Eupsophus vertebralis =

Species of frog

Eupsophus vertebralis also known as the Valdivian ground frog, is a species of frog in the family Alsodidae. It is found in Argentina and Chile.

== Habitat ==
Its natural habitats are Nothofagus forest, rivers, and intermittent freshwater marshes. People find these frogs under logs. Scientists observed this frog between 50 and 1100 meters above sea level.

Scientists have found this frog inside some protected parks: National Park Tolhuaca, Parque Nacional Alerce Costero, Parque Nacional Puyehue, Monumento Natural Contulmo, and Parque Nacional Nahuel Huapi.

== Threats ==
The IUCN classifies this animal as least concern of extinction. It is threatened by habitat loss associated with firewood collection and conversion of forest land to pine and eucalyptus plantations. Forest fires are also a threat.

== Young ==
The female frog lays eggs in small puddles in the ground. The tadpoles do not eat.

== Defense ==
The species is capable of releasing a sticky secretion from its skin when stressed. The shear strength of this secretion is similar to that of cyanoacrylate (also known as super glue).

== Original description ==
- Duméril, A. M. C.; G. Bibron (1841). "Erpétologie Genérale ou Histoire Naturelle Complète des Reptiles". Paris: Librarie Enclyclopedique de Roret. 6.
