= Alsodes igneus =

Conservation status
- Vulnerable (IUCN 3.1)

Scientific classification
- Kingdom: Animalia
- Phylum: Chordata
- Class: Amphibia
- Order: Anura
- Family: Alsodidae
- Genus: Alsodes
- Species: A. igneus

Binomial name
- Alsodes igneus Cuevas & Formas, 2005
- Alsodes igneus (Chile)
- A. igneus is only known from Tolhuaca National Park in Chile

Species of amphibian

Alsodes igneus is a species of frogs in the family Alsodidae endemic to Chile; it is only known from its type locality, Tolhuaca National Park, Malleco Province, on the western slopes of the Andes. The specific name igneus, meaning "something that is of fire", was chosen to symbolize the survival of the population from a great forest fire that affected the type locality in 2000.

== Description ==
Male Alsodes igneus measure about 46 mm (1.8 in) in snout–vent length (based on a single male) and females about 59–67 mm (2.3–2.6 in) (based on two females, including the holotype). The snout is short and slightly truncated in dorsal view. There is a black ribbon extending below the canthus rostralis; the background colour is khaki. The dorsal surface is granular. Toes are scarcely fringed and webbing is absent. Tadpoles are up to 61 mm (2.4 in) in length.

== Habitat ==
The habitat of A. igneus is Nothofagus woodland; adults have been found at the edge of a small stream and the tadpoles among rocks within the stream. The altitude of the type locality is 920 m (3,020 ft).
