= Limnomedusa =

Limnomedusa may refer to:

- Limnomedusae, an order of jellyfish within the subclass Trachylinae
- Limnomedusa (genus), a genus of South American frog, containing only the species Limnomedusa macroglossa
