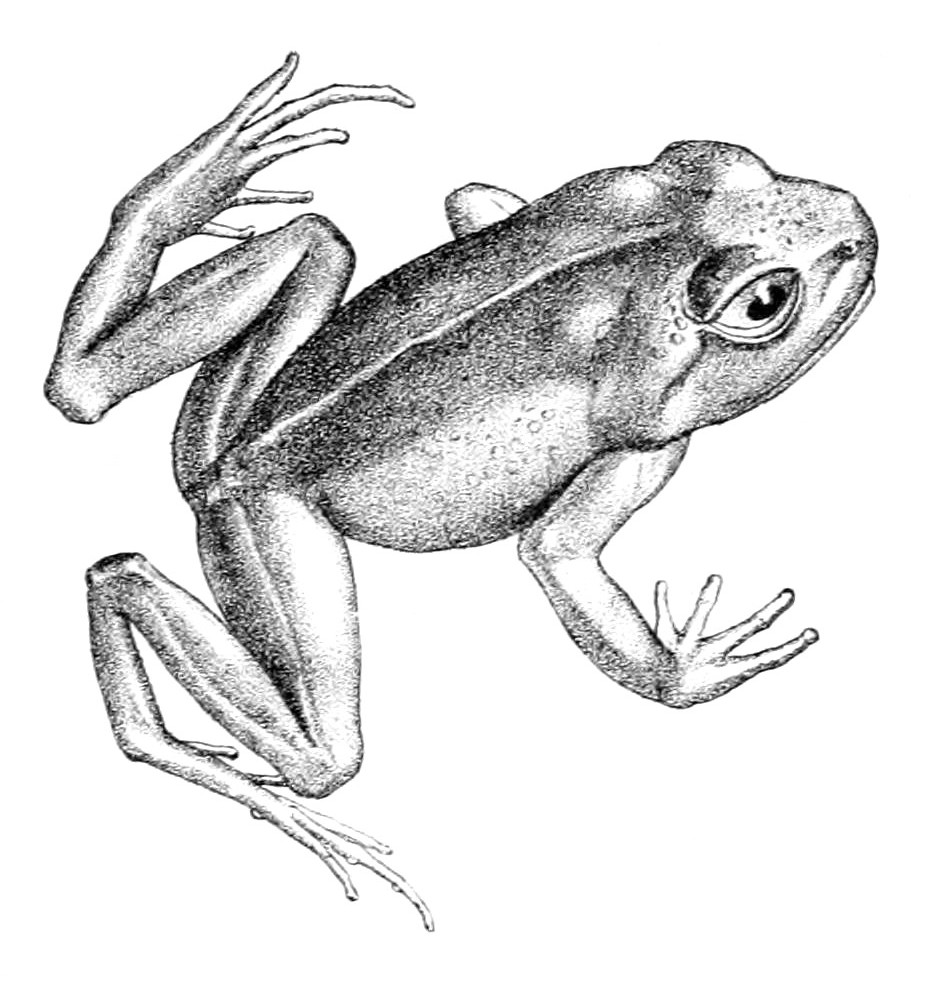

Conservation status
- Data Deficient (IUCN 3.1)

Scientific classification
- Kingdom: Animalia
- Phylum: Chordata
- Class: Amphibia
- Order: Anura
- Family: Alsodidae
- Genus: Alsodes
- Species: A. monticola

Binomial name
- Alsodes monticola Bell, 1843

Synonyms
- Caccotus coppingeri Günther, 1881; Eupsophus coppingeri Capurro, 1958

= Alsodes monticola =

Species of frog

Alsodes monticola (common name: island spiny-chest frog) is a species of frog in the family Alsodidae. It is found in southern Chile and western Santa Cruz Province, Argentina, though its presence in Argentina is disputed. Its habitat preferences are not known, but the region of the type locality (the island of Inchy, in the Chonos Archipelago) has tundra and islands of Nothofagus forest.

Scientists believe that this frog breeds through larval development, like its congeners.

The IUCN classifies this frog as data deficient. The specific threats it faces are not known. However, human beings rarely visit its habitat, so it is unlikely that habitat disturbance from direct, local human contact poses a threat to this frog.

== Original description ==
- Bell, T. (1843). Darwin, C. (ed.). "The Zoology of the Voyage of the H.M.S. Beagle, Under the Command of Captain Fitzroy, R.N., During the Years 1832 to 1836". Reptiles. 5. London, Smith, Elder and Co.: 1–51.
