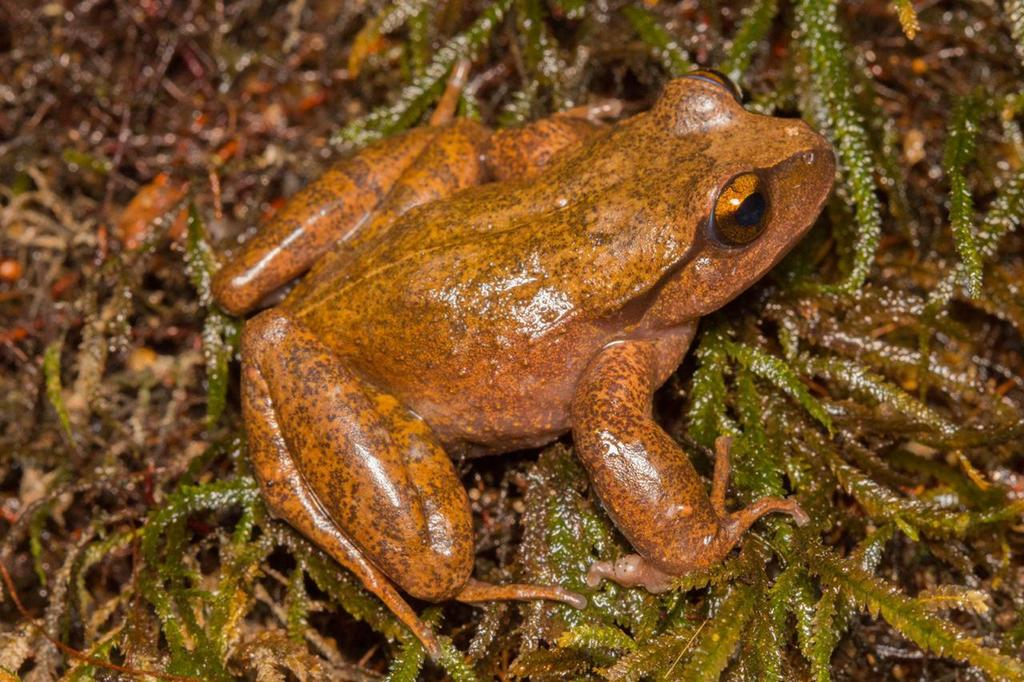

Conservation status
- Critically Endangered (IUCN 3.1)

Scientific classification
- Kingdom: Animalia
- Phylum: Chordata
- Class: Amphibia
- Order: Anura
- Family: Alsodidae
- Genus: Alsodes
- Species: A. cantillanensis

Binomial name
- Alsodes cantillanensis Charrier, Correa-Quezada, Castro, and Méndez-Torres, 2015

= Alsodes cantillanensis =

Species of frog

Alsodes cantillanensis, the Cantillana spiny-chest frog, is a frog. It lives in Chile.

== Description ==
A single adult male specimen was found to measure 45.9 mm in snout-vent length and a single adult female 44.2 mm. The male frog is yellow to dark gray in color with a light triangle shape on its head. The female frog is red to orange in color with a read-orange triangle on its head. The triangles are between the eyes and snout. There is dark color on the canthus. There is a thin yellow vertebral stripe. The ventrum is white with white spikes on the chest. The toes of all four feet are white in color. The top of the iris of the eye is gold-yellow-white in color and the bottom of the iris is black in color.

== Etymology ==
Scientists named this frog for Altos de Cantillana, a mountainous region near Santiago, Chile.

== Habitat ==
This frog lives in Nothofagus forests, where it has been found under rocks in streams, near streams, and under logs with thick layers of leaf litter. This frog has been observed between 729 and 850 meters above sea level.

Scientists believe San Juan de Piche Nature Sanctuary may be home to more than half the population.

== Threats ==
The IUCN classifies this frog as critically endangered, with threats including gold mining, forest fires, and forest conversion to agriculture, tree plantations, and livestock cultivation.

== Original description ==
- Charrier A; Correa C; Castro C; Mendez MA (2015). "A new species of Alsodes (Anura: Alsodidae) from Altos de Cantillana, central Chile". Zootaxa. 3915 (4): 540–550. doi:10.11646/zootaxa.3915.4.5. PMID 25662142.
