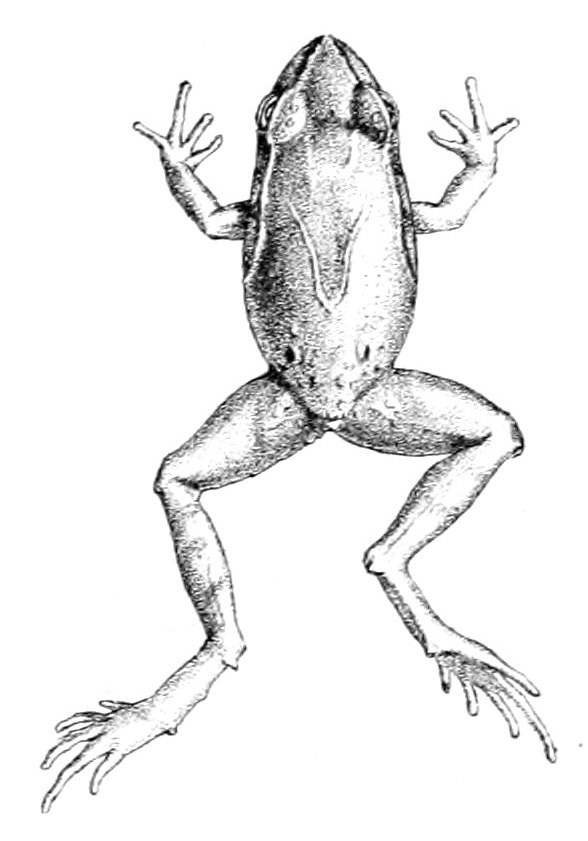

Conservation status
- Least Concern (IUCN 3.1)

Scientific classification
- Kingdom: Animalia
- Phylum: Chordata
- Class: Amphibia
- Order: Anura
- Family: Alsodidae
- Genus: Eupsophus
- Species: E. calcaratus

Binomial name
- Eupsophus calcaratus (Günther, 1881)

Synonyms
- Cacotus calcaratus Günther, 1881; Zachaenus roseus Cope, 1890

= Eupsophus calcaratus =

Species of frog

Eupsophus calcaratus (common name: Chiloe Island ground frog) is a species of frog in the family Alsodidae. It is endemic to Patagonia (southern Argentina and Chile). It has one of the broadest distributions of any Chilean frog.

== Description ==
Eupsophus calcaratus are moderate-sized frogs measuring 31–36 mm (1.2–1.4 in) in snout–vent length. Head is wider than long and snout is rounded. Skin is only slightly granulated but has many spots and reticulated pattern. The colouration is highly variable, but it usually has a characteristic, hourglass-shaped pattern in its head.

The tadpoles develop in water-filled cavities on the ground. Males show parental care: they remain with the eggs and tadpoles. Tadpoles are endotrophic.

== Habitat and conservation ==
Its natural habitat is humid Nothofagus temperate forest. It occurs in shady microhabitats (swamps and streams borders).

The species is common in appropriate habitats. Nevertheless, habitat loss and degradation due to deforestation is a major threat, and water pollution caused by forestry work is also a threat.
