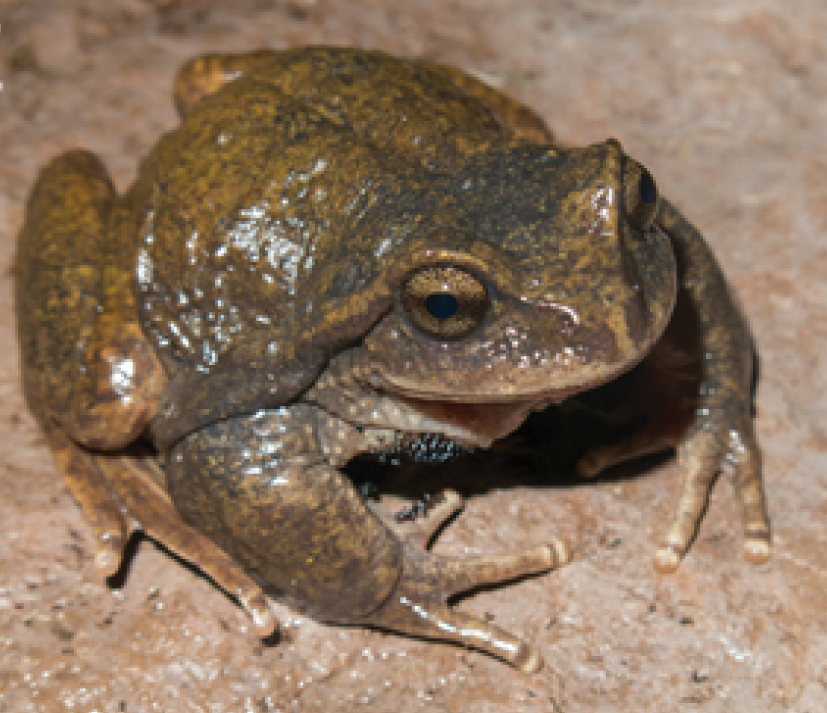

Conservation status
- Vulnerable (IUCN 3.1)

Scientific classification
- Kingdom: Animalia
- Phylum: Chordata
- Class: Amphibia
- Order: Anura
- Family: Alsodidae
- Genus: Alsodes
- Species: A. hugoi

Binomial name
- Alsodes hugoi Cuevas and Formas, 2001

= Alsodes hugoi =

Species of amphibian

Alsodes hugoi is a species of frogs in the family Alsodidae. It is endemic to Chile and only known from its type locality, Río Lircay, in Alto de Vilches, Talca Province, on the western slopes of the Andes. The specific name hugoi honors Professor Hugo Campos Cereceda, for his "remarkable contributions to the development of the natural sciences in Chile".

Alsodes hugoi is only known from Alto de Vilches in Central Chile

== Description ==
The type series consists of two adult males and two adult females. The males measure 68 and 69 mm (2.7 and 2.7 in) and females 66 and 71 mm (2.6 and 2.8 in) in snout–vent length. A juvenile specimen measured 30 mm (1.2 in) SVL. tympanum is absent. The body is robust with well-developed arms and legs. The fingers have rounded tips and no webbing. The toes are long, thick, and with rounded tips. There is no webbing but some membrane between the toes IV and V. The dorsal coloration is light brown with golden tints. The legs and arms have black bars on their dorsal surfaces. There is a black triangular mark between the eyes and pointing backward. The venter is whitish.

Late-stage tadpoles (Gosner stage 40) measure 26–27 mm (1.0–1.1 in) in body length and 61–62 mm (2.4–2.4 in) in total length.

== Habitat and conservation ==
Natural habitat of Alsodes hugoi is temperate Nothofagus forest at elevations of 900–1,200 m (3,000–3,900 ft) above sea level. They live in water in streams or very close to streams under rocks. The species shares this habitat with Telmatobufo venustus.

The species is threatened by tourists who disturb its habitat and by habitat loss through forest fires. However, the species is protected by Altos de Lircay National Reserve.
