= Alsodes tumultuosus =

Conservation status
- Vulnerable (IUCN 3.1)

Scientific classification
- Kingdom: Animalia
- Phylum: Chordata
- Class: Amphibia
- Order: Anura
- Family: Alsodidae
- Genus: Alsodes
- Species: A. tumultuosus

Binomial name
- Alsodes tumultuosus Veloso, Iturra & Galleguillos, 1979

Species of frog

Alsodes tumultuosus is a species of frog in the family Alsodidae. It is endemic to Farellones in central Chile.

== Habitat ==
Its natural habitats are temperate grassland and rivers. This frog lives in cold streams with cold-tolerant Andean grasses nearby. Scientists observed the frog between 1500 and 3000 meters above sea level.

The frog has been found in one protected place: Reserva Nacional Río Cipreses.

== Life cycle ==
The tadpoles develop in streams.

== Threats ==
The IUCN classifies this frog as vulnerable to extinction. Infrastructure for skiing and tourism and related pollution have affected its habitat. Hydroelectric dams could also hurt this frog. Scientists also found the fungal disease chytridiomycosis in one subpopulation.

== Original description ==
- Veloso, A.; P. Iturra-Constant; R. Galleguillos-G. (1979). "Evidencias cromosomicas en el genero Alsodes (Amphibia– Leptodactylidae) con la descripcion de una nueva especie". Physis. Buenos Aires. 38: 91–98.
