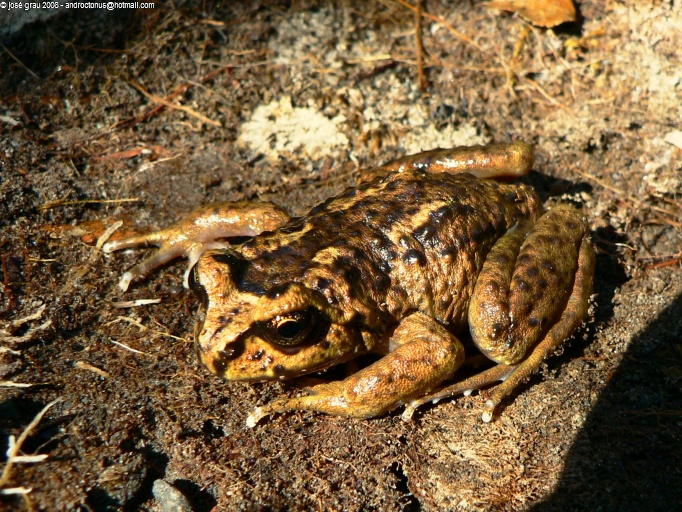
- Alsodes verrucosus from Volcan Calbuco in southern Chile.

Conservation status
- Endangered (IUCN 3.1)

Scientific classification
- Kingdom: Animalia
- Phylum: Chordata
- Class: Amphibia
- Order: Anura
- Family: Alsodidae
- Genus: Alsodes
- Species: A. verrucosus

Binomial name
- Alsodes verrucosus (Philippi, 1902)

= Alsodes verrucosus =

Species of frog

Alsodes verrucosus (common name: olive spiny-chest frog) is a species of frog in the family Alsodidae. It is found in the Andes of Chile (Cautín and Puyehue) and Neuquén and Río Negro Provinces, Argentina. These frogs inhabit temperate Nothofagus forest where they occur under logs and near damp areas. Tadpoles develop in cold, deep streams. Scientists have seen this frog between 500 and 1000 meters above sea level.

People have seen this frog in one protected place: Puyehue National Park.

It is threatened by habitat loss caused by logging.
