= Tolhuaca National Park =

National Park in Araucanía Region, Chile

- IUCN category II (national park)
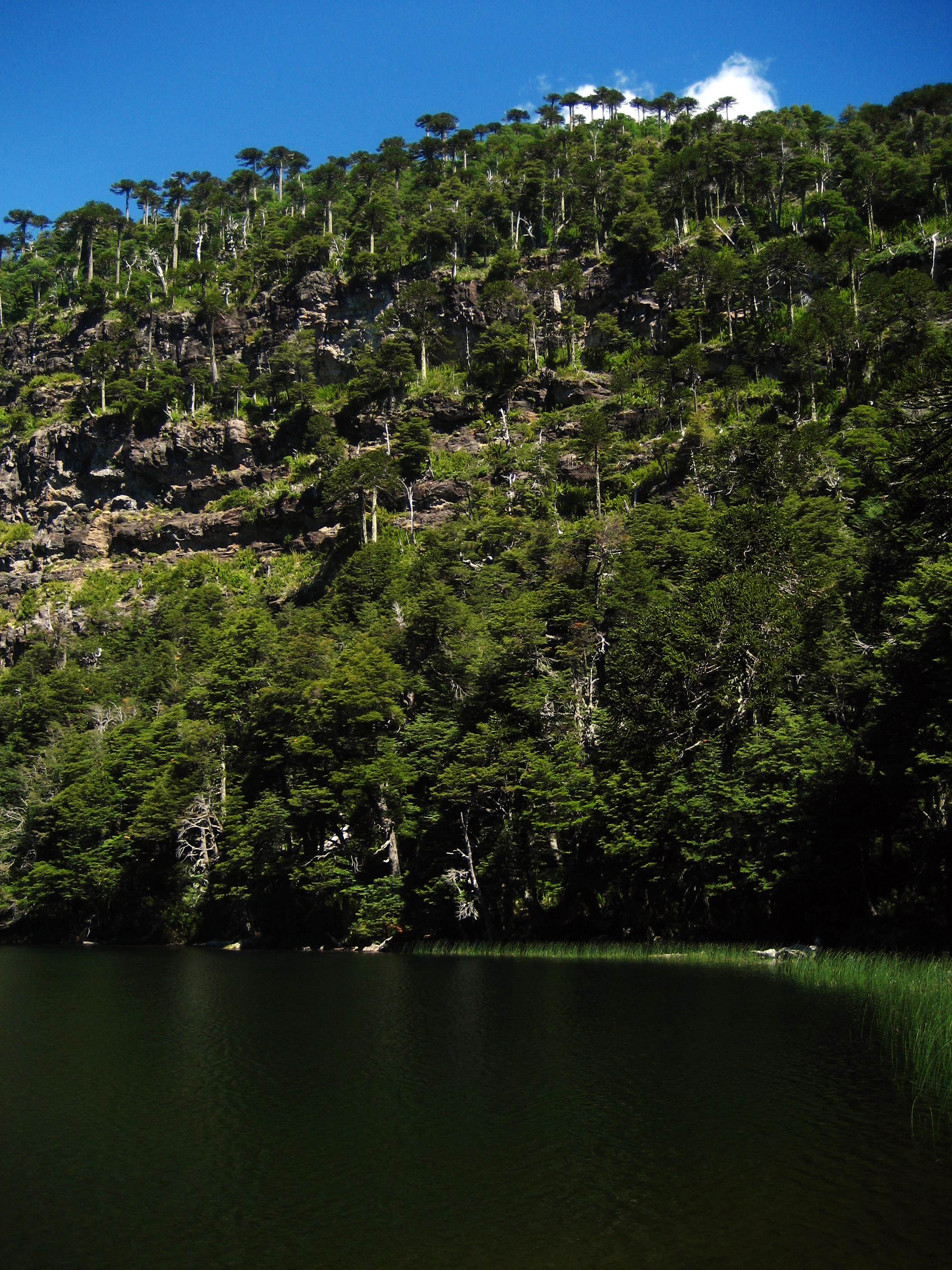
- Laguna Verde

- Location within Chile
- Location: La Araucanía Region, Chile
- Nearest city: Curacautín
- Coordinates: 38°12′0″S 71°50′0″W
- Area: 6.474 ha
- Established: 1935
- Governing body: Corporación Nacional Forestal

Tolhuaca National Park (Spanish pronunciation: [tolˈwaka]) is a protected area created on October 16, 1935, in an area of 3,500 ha that was previously part of the Malleco National Reserve. In 1985, a second section of Malleco National Reserve was also made part of the national park. Malleco National Reserve was the first protected wildlife area in both Chile and South America, so the land within Tolhuaca National Park is one of the oldest protected areas on the continent.

== Location ==
The park is located in the commune of Curacautín, which lies within Malleco Province in La Araucania Region in southern Chile. It encompasses part of the forested lower western spurs and foothills of the Andes. Adjoining the park to the north is Malleco National Reserve. The park has an elevation of 700–1,821 m (2,297–5,974 ft) asl. It includes small lakes and numerous ponds, among them the Laguna Malleco and the Laguna Verde. The source of the Malleco River is located within the park and Tolhuaca volcano is situated in near the park, dominating its vistas.

=== Access and attractions ===
There are two main points of access to the park. The first is via "Inspector Fernandes Road", 5 km north of the town of Victoria, along 74 km of gravel road. The second access is located at Kilometre 34 on the road between Curacautín and Tolhuaca Hot Springs.

Attractions

The main attractions of the park include its varied flora and fauna, its views of Tolhuaca volcano and its many hiking trails. There is an information centre, park rangers and picnic areas.

There are four signposted trails in the park: the Chilpa trail, La Culebra–Lago Verde trail, Lagunillas trail and Salto Malleco trail

== Climate ==
The climate is cold in the highest regions of the park and moderate in the valleys. Rain is possible throughout the year and the temperature oscillates between day and night time.

== Flora ==
The park's higher regions are dominated by:

- Nothofagus dombeyi, known locally as the coihue or coigue (from koywe in Mapuche language)
- Nothofagus pumilio or lenga beech, a deciduous tree or shrub from the coihue family
- Nothofagus obliqua, also known as Patagonian oak, roble or roble beech
- Araucaria araucana, known monkey puzzle, monkey tail, Chilean pine or pehuén, which is often covered in lichen.
Tolhuaca National Park Flora

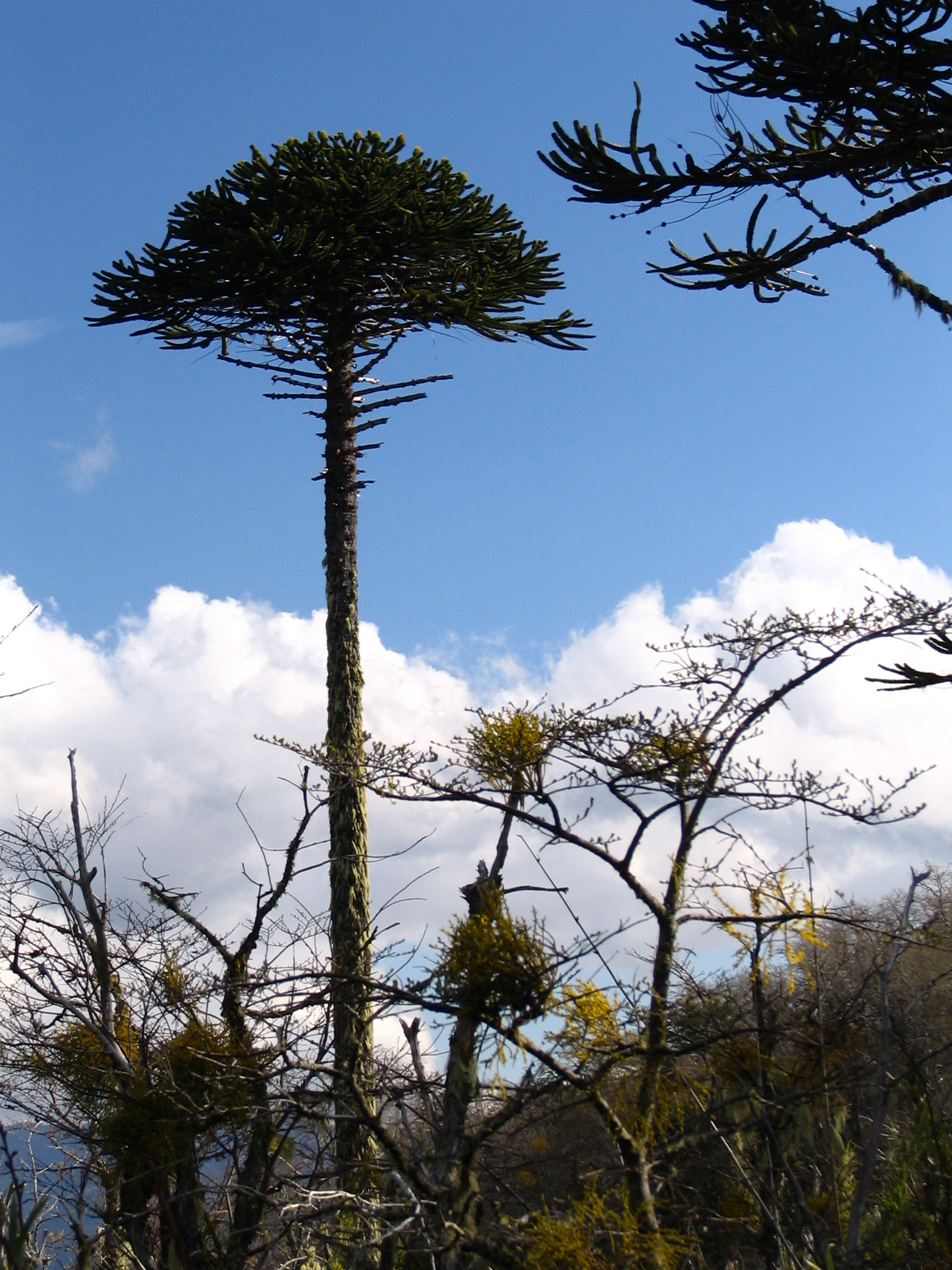
Araucaria, known as monkey puzzle tree

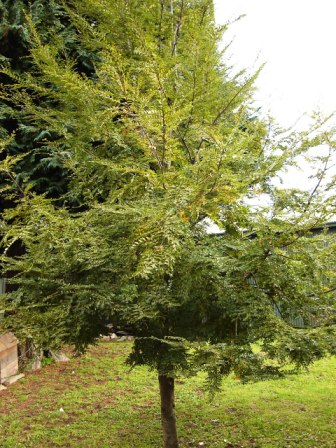
A young Coihue tree

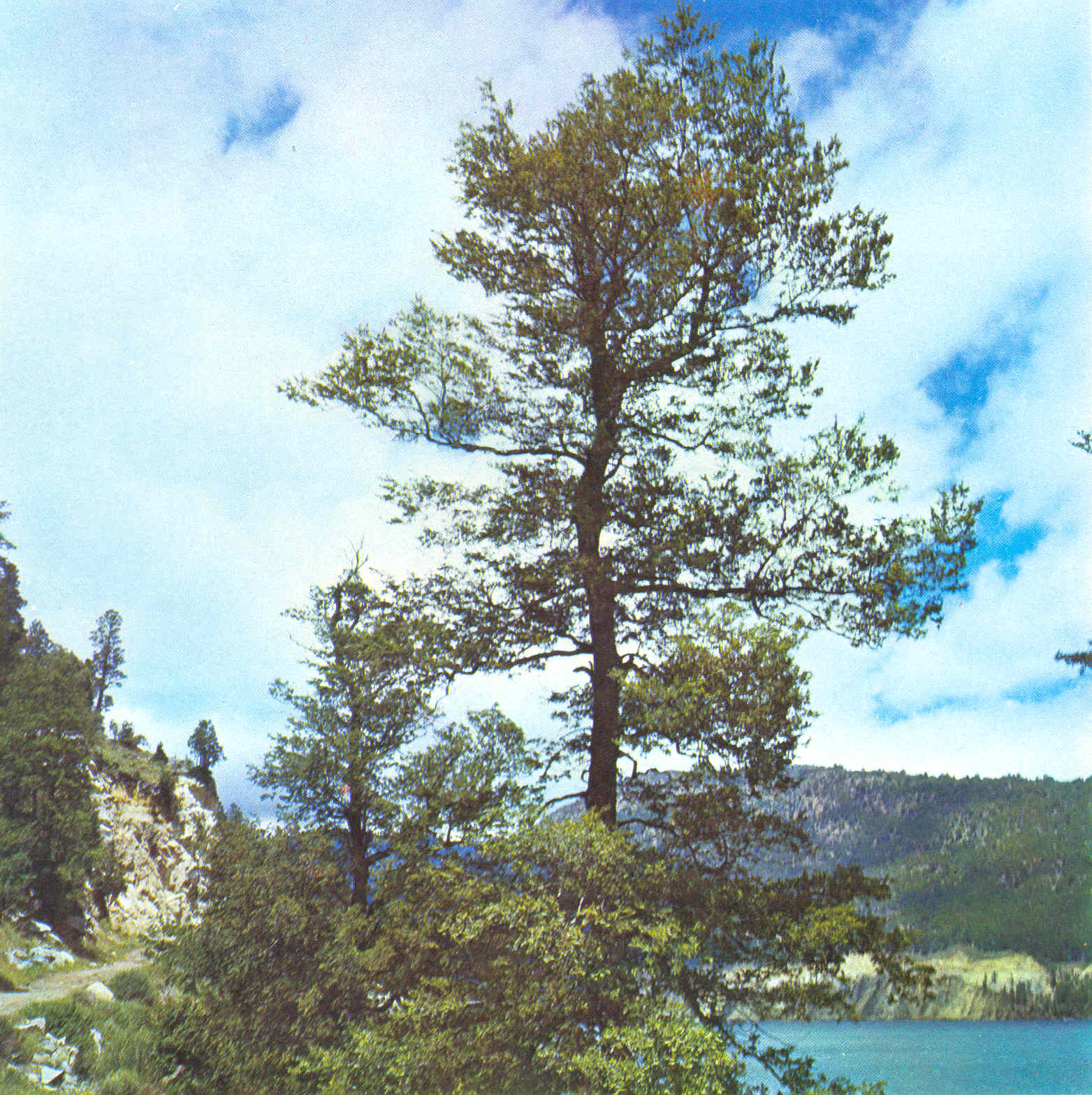
The Patagonian oak, roble or roble beech

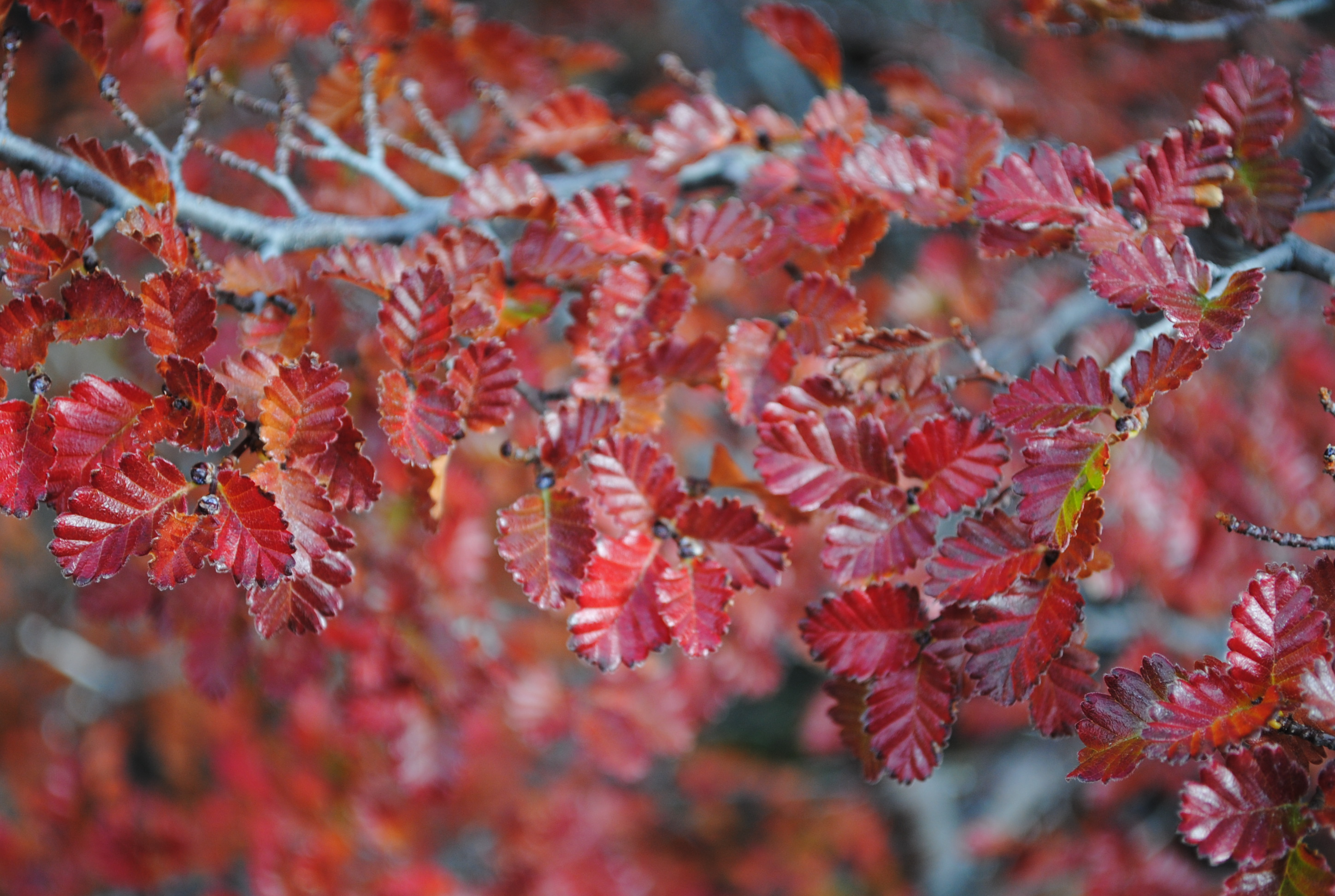
Fall lenga beech leaves

== Fauna ==
The park is home to many species of seabirds that live there and visit its lakes. Malleco Lake is monitored monthly by CONAF, the Chilean Forestry Commission, which keeps a register of the number of birds that visit, live and reproduce in the lake to identify species in need of protection.

Bird species found in the park include: Andean gull (Chroicocephalus serranus), a species of gull from the family Laridae; yellow-billed teal (Anas flavirostris); rosy-billed pochard (Netta peposaca). Its Latin name comes from the words netta, the Ancient Greek for duck, and peposaca, a transcription of the bird's Guaraní name, which means "showy wings". Netta species have a bright white stripe on their remiges which becomes visible in flight; Lake duck (Oxyura vittata); Chimango caracara (Milvago chimango), a bird of prey similar to the Peregrine falcon, known locally as the tiuque; buff-necked ibis (Theristicus caudatus), also known as the white-throated ibis or bandurria; Andean condor; ringed kingfisher (Megaceryle torquata), found in wooded areas; Magellanic woodpecker (Campephilus magellanicus), also found in wooded areas.

Mammal species found in the park include the cougar (Puma concolor), coypu (Myocastor coypus, river rat or nutria), the South American gray fox (Lycalopex griseus), the kodkod or güiña (Leopardus guigna). Frog Alsodes igneus is found only in Tolhuaca National Park, its type locality).

In wooded areas, the rare pudú (Pudu puda), a small deer, can be found as well as the monito del monte (Dromiciops gliroides), Spanish for "little bush monkey". Also called chumaihuén in Mapudungun, the monito del monte is a diminutive marsupial endemic to southwestern South America.

Tolhuaca National Park Fauna

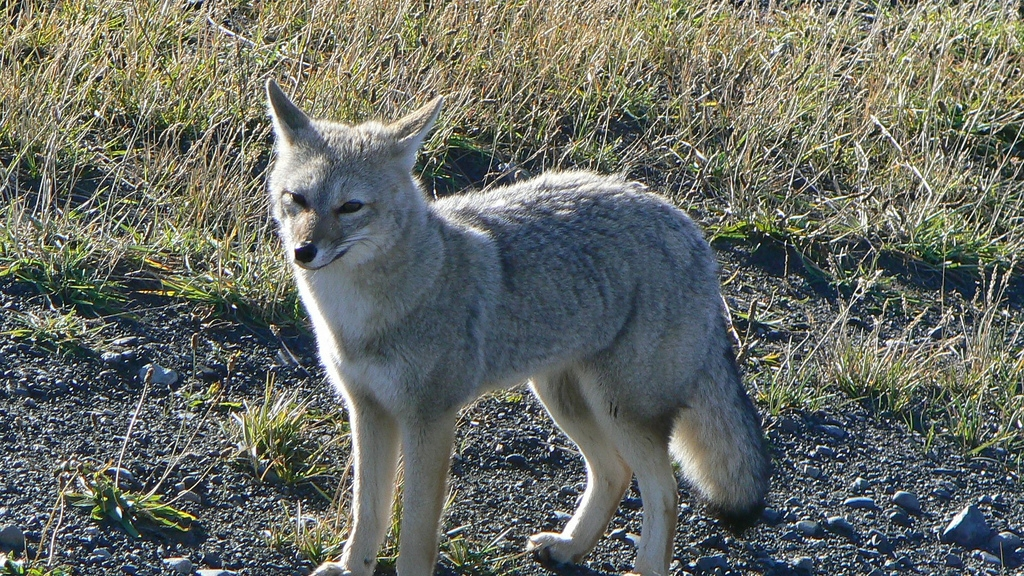
South American gray fox (Lycalopex griseus)

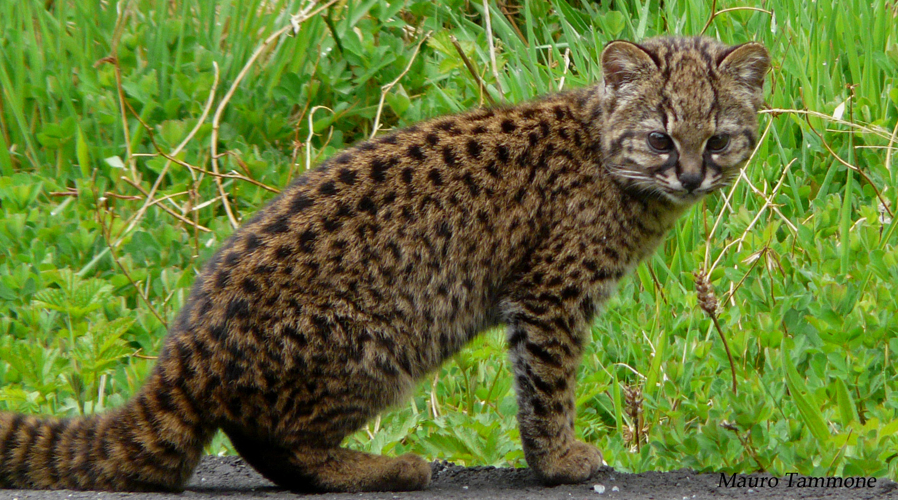
Kodkod or güiña (Leopardus guigna)

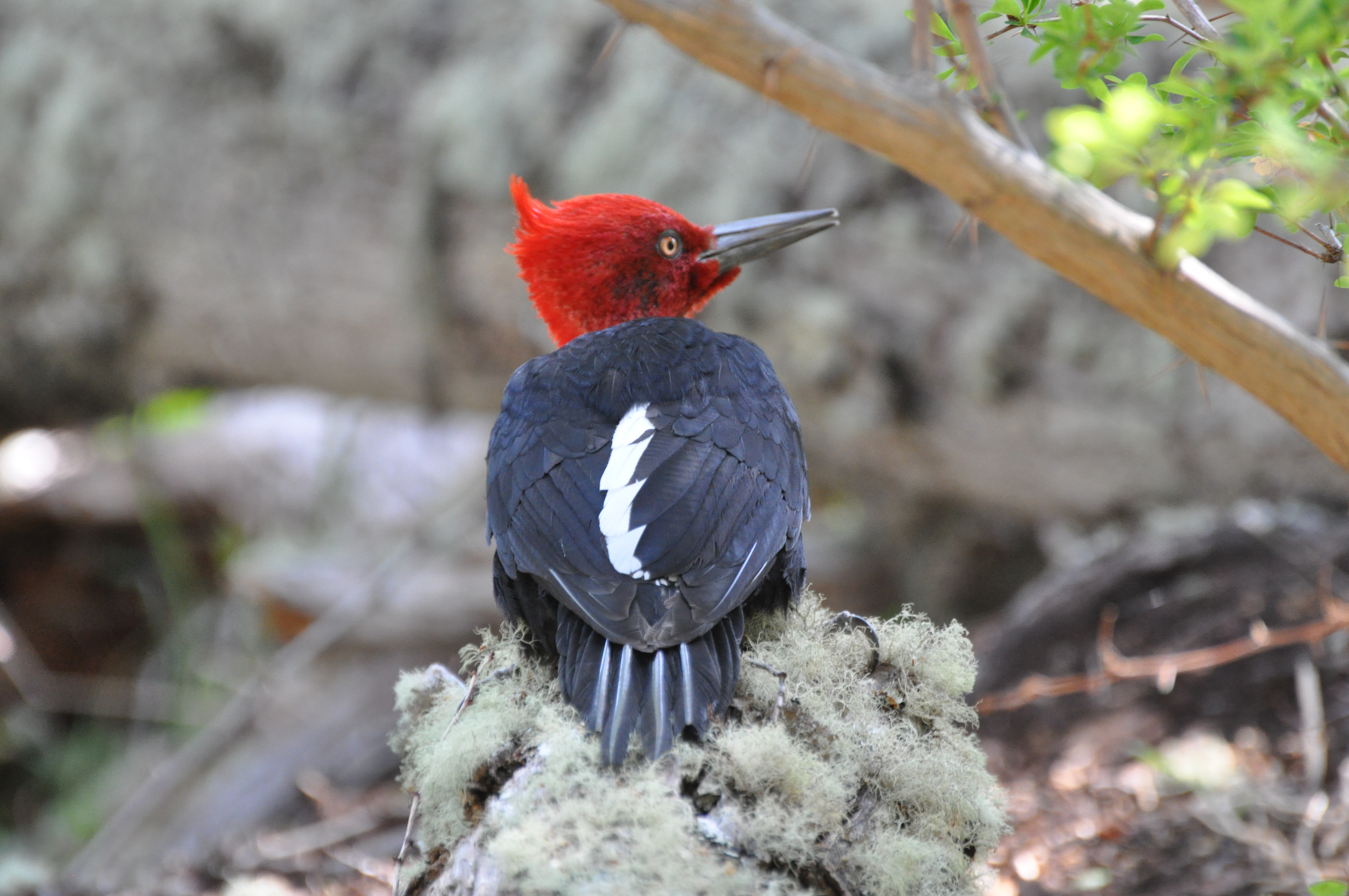
Magellanic woodpecker (Campephilus magellanicus).

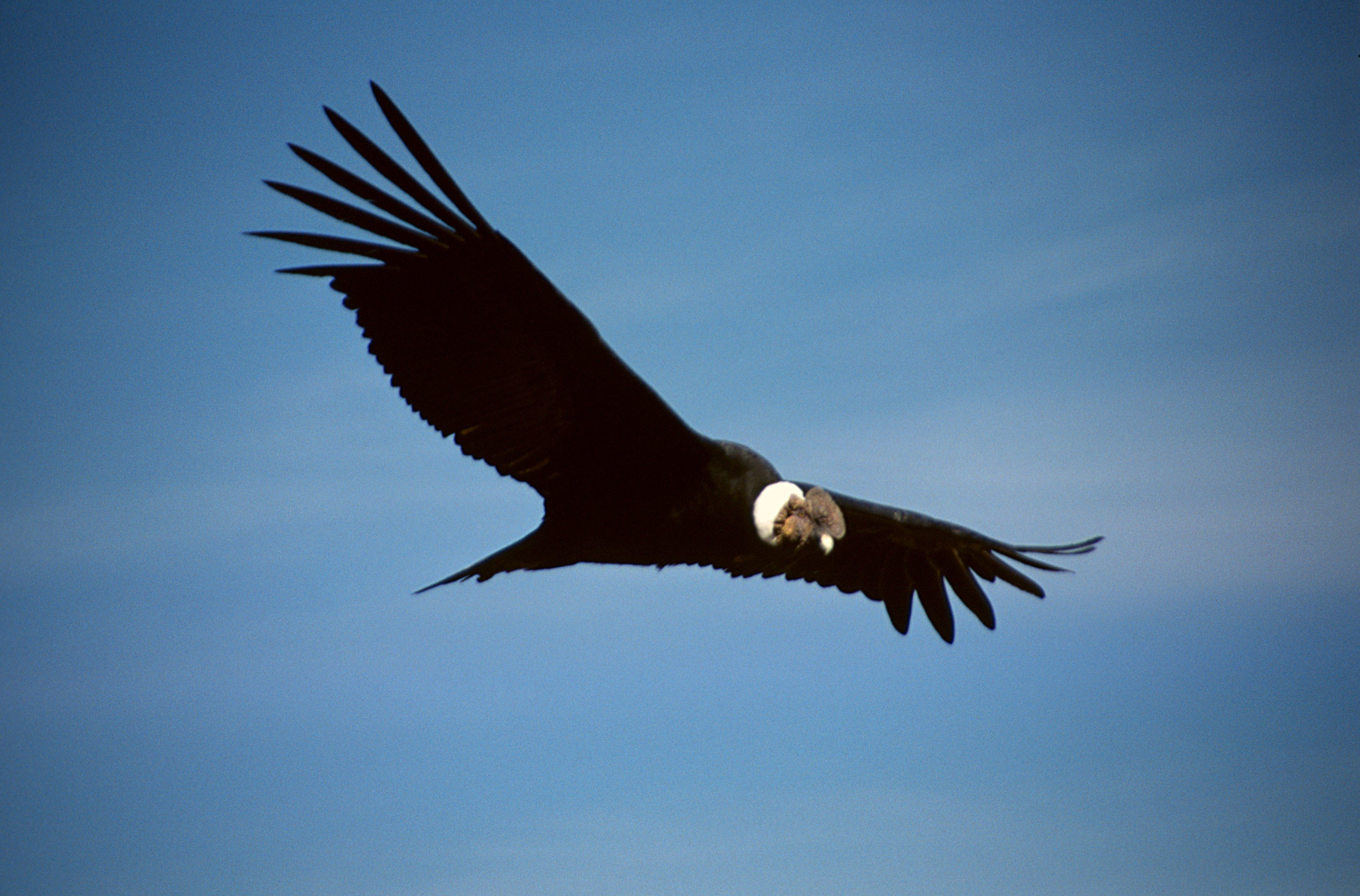
Andean condor

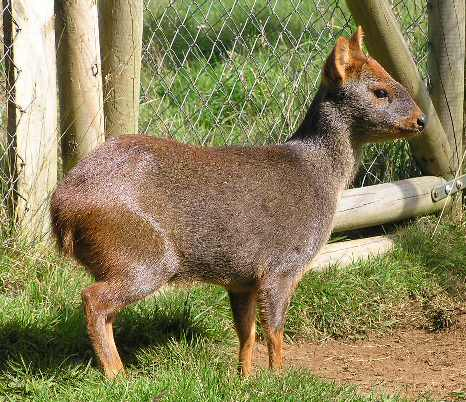
Pudú

== See also ==
- CONAF
