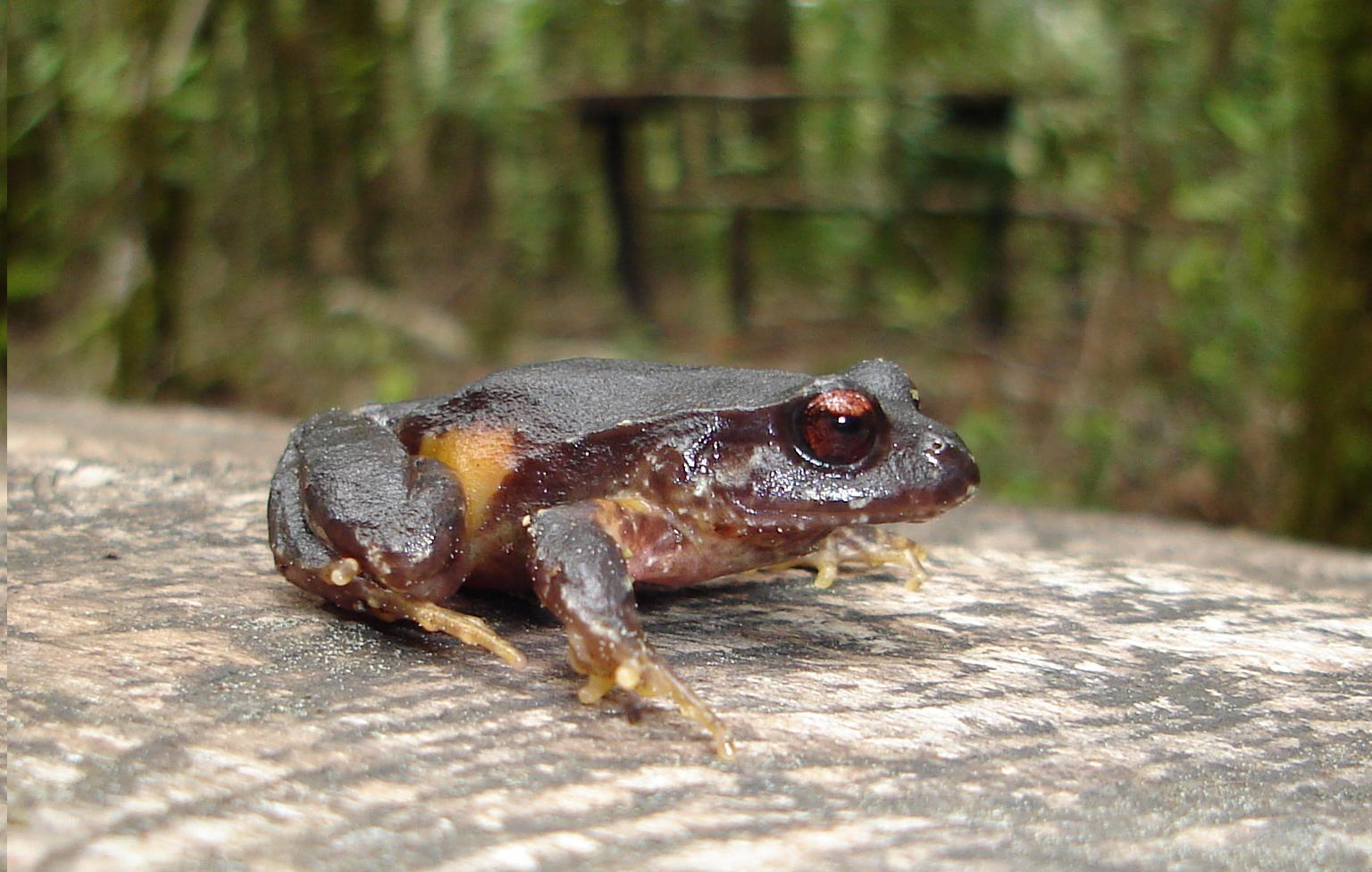

Conservation status
- Least Concern (IUCN 3.1)

Scientific classification
- Kingdom: Animalia
- Phylum: Chordata
- Class: Amphibia
- Order: Anura
- Family: Alsodidae
- Genus: Eupsophus
- Species: E. roseus

Binomial name
- Eupsophus roseus (Duméril and Bibron, 1841)

= Eupsophus roseus =

Species of frog

Eupsophus roseus, the rosy ground frog, is a species of frog in the family Alsodidae. It is endemic to Chile. Its natural habitats are temperate forest, rivers, swampland, and intermittent freshwater marshes. It is threatened by habitat loss.

== Habitat ==
Scientists found this frog in forests with Nothofagus plants and on pine tree farms, where they are found on the leaf litter. The frogs occur between 50 and 1200 meters above sea level.

The frog was ovserved inside some protected parks: Monumento Natural Cerro Ñielol, Parque Nacional Nahuelbuta, Monumento Natural de Contulmo, Reserva Nacional Nonguén, and Reserva Costera Valdiviana.

== Reproduction ==
Males have been heard calling from September to January, which coincides with the rainy season. The female frog lays about 200 eggs per clutch. She lays them in water-filled holes in the ground. The endotrophic tadpoles remain in the nest. Scientists suspect parental care.

== Threats ==
The IUCN classifies this frog as least concern of extinction. The principal threats are habitat loss associated with firewood collection and sylviculture, specifically pine and eucalyptus. Forest fires and tourism may also affect this frog.

== Original description ==
- Duméril, A. M. C.; G. Bibron (1841). Erpétologie Genérale ou Histoire Naturelle Complète des Reptiles. Vol. 6. Paris: Librairie Encyclopedique de Roret.
