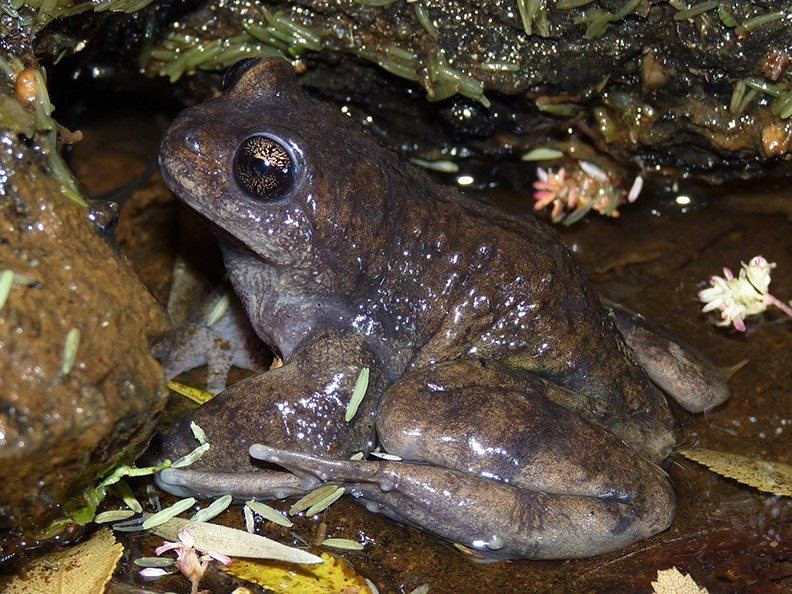

Conservation status
- Data Deficient (IUCN 3.1)

Scientific classification
- Kingdom: Animalia
- Phylum: Chordata
- Class: Amphibia
- Order: Anura
- Family: Alsodidae
- Genus: Alsodes
- Species: A. australis

Binomial name
- Alsodes australis Formas, Ubeda, Cuevas & Nuñez, 1997

= Alsodes australis =

Species of frog

Alsodes australis is a species of frog in the family Alsodidae. It is endemic to Chile and tentatively believed to live in Argentina as well.

== Habitat ==
This frog has been found in cold streams in Northofagus forests on mountains. This frog has been observed between 0 and 1400 meters above sea level.

The frog has been observed in two protected areas: Bernardo O'Higgins National Park and Queulat National Park in Chile. There are also some frogs in Argentina's Nahuel Huapi National Park that scientists think may be a population of A. australis.

== Threats ==
The IUCN classifies this frog as data deficient. Introduced salmonid fish and American mink may prey upon this frog.

== Life cycle ==
This animal breeds through larval development. Tadpoles swim in streams.

== Original publication ==
- Formas, J. R.; C. A. Úbeda; C. C. Cuevas; J. J. Nuñez (1997). "Alsodes australis, a new species of leptodactylid frog from the temperate Nothofagus forest of southern Chile and Argentina. Studies on Neotropical Fauna and Environment". Amsterdam. 32: 200–211.
