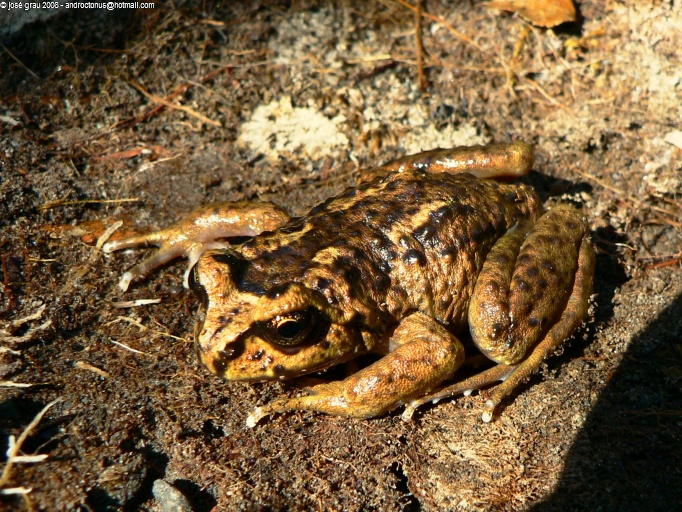
- Alsodes verrucosus from Volcan Calbuco in southern Chile

Scientific classification
- Domain: Eukaryota
- Kingdom: Animalia
- Phylum: Chordata
- Class: Amphibia
- Order: Anura
- Family: Alsodidae
- Genus: Alsodes; Bell, 1843

Type species
- Alsodes monticola Bell, 1843

Species
- 19, see text.

= Alsodes =

Genus of amphibians

Alsodes is a genus of alsodid frogs found in Chile and Argentina. It is the most species-rich frog genus in Patagonia. Common name spiny-chest frogs has been coined for them.

== Description ==
Characteristic for this genus is that during the reproductive season, adult males have thorny structures on the fingers and rounded spiny patches on the chest. Breeding takes place in high-elevation streams, and tadpoles have slow development, including overwintering under ice cover.

== Species ==
There are 19 species in the genus:

- Alsodes australis Formas, Úbeda, Cuevas & Nuñez, 1997
- Alsodes barrioi Veloso, Diaz, Iturra & Penna, 1981
- Alsodes cantillanensis Charrier, Correa-Quezada, Castro, and Méndez-Torres, 2015
- Alsodes coppingeri (Günther, 1881)
- Alsodes gargola Gallardo, 1970
- Alsodes hugoi Cuevas & Formas, 2001
- Alsodes igneus Cuevas & Formas, 2005
- Alsodes kaweshkari Formas, Cuevas & Nuñez, 1998
- Alsodes montanus (Lataste in Philippi, 1902)
- Alsodes monticola Bell, 1843
- Alsodes neuquensis Cei, 1976
- Alsodes nodosus (Duméril & Bibron, 1841)
- Alsodes norae Cuevas, 2008
- Alsodes pehuenche Cei, 1976
- Alsodes tumultuosus Veloso, Iturra & Galleguillos, 1979
- Alsodes valdiviensis Formas, Cuevas & Brieva, 2002
- Alsodes vanzolinii (Donoso-Barros, 1974)
- Alsodes verrucosus (Philippi, 1902)
- Alsodes vittatus (Philippi, 1902)
