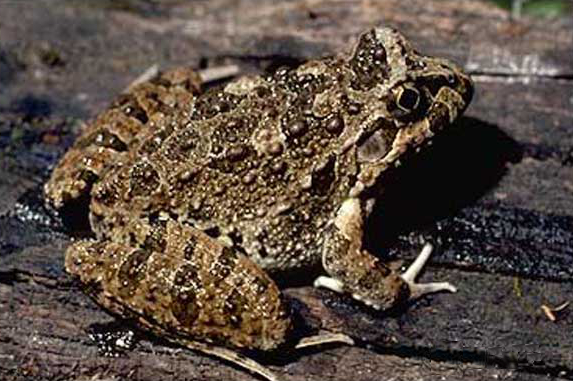

Conservation status
- Least Concern (IUCN 3.1)

Scientific classification
- Kingdom: Animalia
- Phylum: Chordata
- Class: Amphibia
- Order: Anura
- Family: Alsodidae
- Genus: Limnomedusa; Fitzinger, 1843
- Species: L. macroglossa

Binomial name
- Limnomedusa macroglossa (Duméril & Bibron, 1841)

Synonyms
- Leptodactylus nova-teutoniae Ahl, 1936; Limnomedusa misionis Schmidt, 1944; Litopleura maritimum Jiménez de la Espada, 1875

= Limnomedusa macroglossa =

Species of amphibian

Limnomedusa macroglossa (common name: rapids frog) is a species of frog in the family Alsodidae, in the monotypic genus Limnomedusa. It is found in southern Brazil, northeastern Argentina, Uruguay, and northern Paraguay.

== Description ==
The adult frog measures 37.6–55.0 mm in snout-vent length. The female frog is larger than the male frog. The skin of the dorsum is gray in color with distinct dark brown spots. There are canthal stripes on the snout. There are spots near the mouth and another spot between the eyes. There is a V-shaped mark between the shoulders. There are bars on all four limbs.

== Habitat ==
Limnomedusa macroglossa are found in open and forested areas on rocky soil along rivers. Tadpoles are found in temporary riverside pools. Scientists observed the frog as high as 1200 meters above sea level.

Scientists have seen this frog in a number of protected parks and other areas in several countries: Iguazu National Park, El Palmar National Park, Yaboti Biosphere Reserve, Monumento científico Moisés Bertoni, Ibirapuitã Biological Reserve, FLONA de Chapeco, PARES Fritz Plaumann, PARES Rio Guarani, PARES Turvo, PARNA do Iguacu, and REBIO do Ibicui Mirim.

== Young ==
The eggs are round with a black dot on one pore and a beige dot on the opposite pore. The tadpoles swim in temporary ponds near rivers.

== Threats ==
The IUCN and scientists from Uruguay classify this frog as least concern. Scientists from Paraguay classify the frog as critically endangered within Paraguay. Its principal threats are habitat degradation due to agricultural activities, water pollution, hydroelectric development, and pine plantations. For example, the Itaipu Dam destroyed populations in Paraná.
