= Roblería del Cobre de Loncha National Reserve =

- IUCN category IV (habitat/species management area)
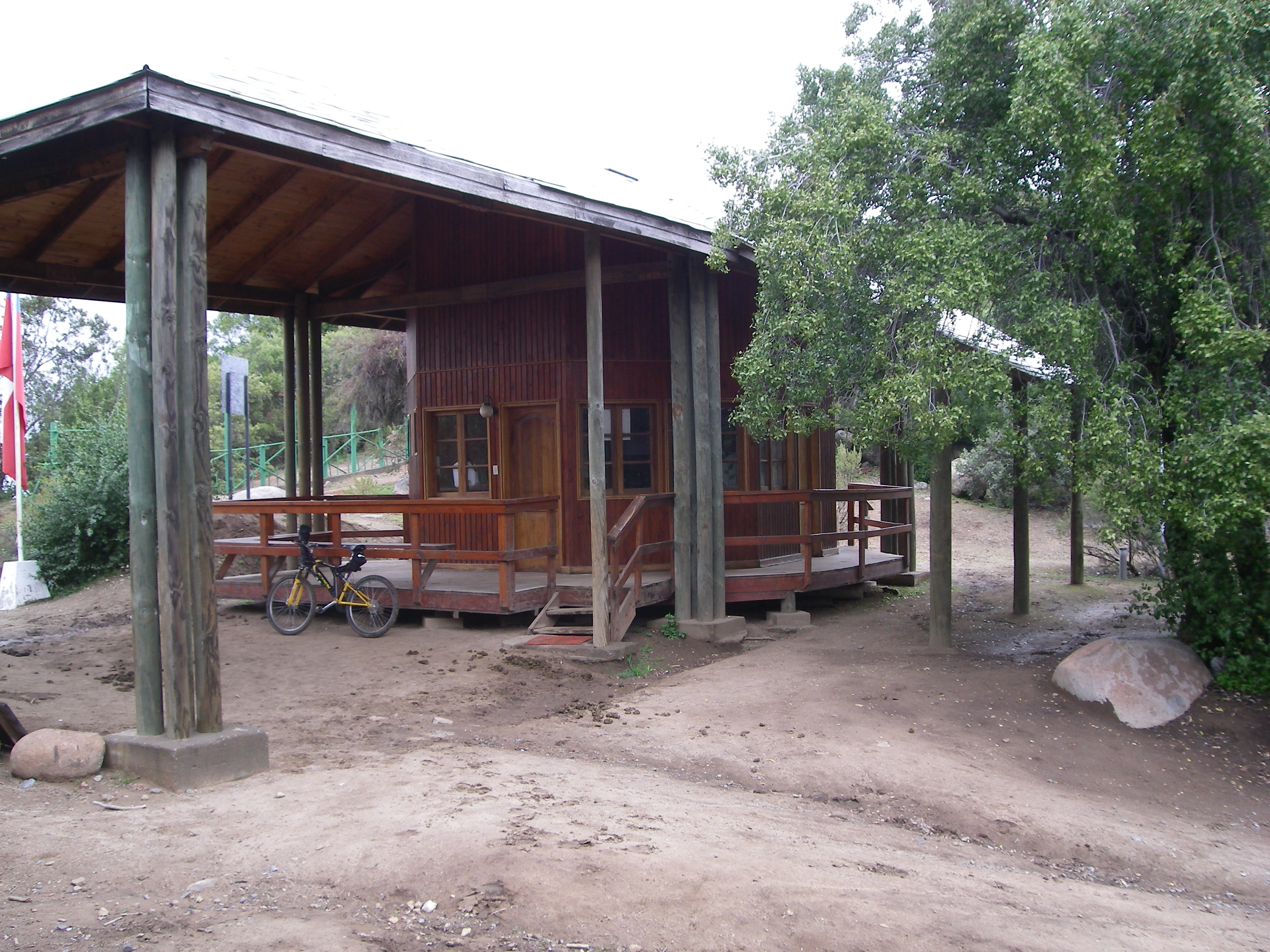
- Interactive map of Roblería del Cobre de Loncha National Reserve
- Location: Santiago Metropolitan Region, Chile
- Coordinates: 34.0833°S 70.9000°W
- Area: 58.7 km^{2} (22.7 sq mi)
- Designation: National reserve
- Designated: 1996
- Governing body: Corporación Nacional Forestal (CONAF)

Roblería del Cobre de Loncha National Reserve is a national reserve in the Santiago Metropolitan Region of Chile.

In terms of vegetational regions, the reserve has sclerophyllous forest and deciduous forest.
