= Río Clarillo National Park =

National park in Chile

- Río Clarillo National Reserve
- IUCN category IV (habitat/species management area)
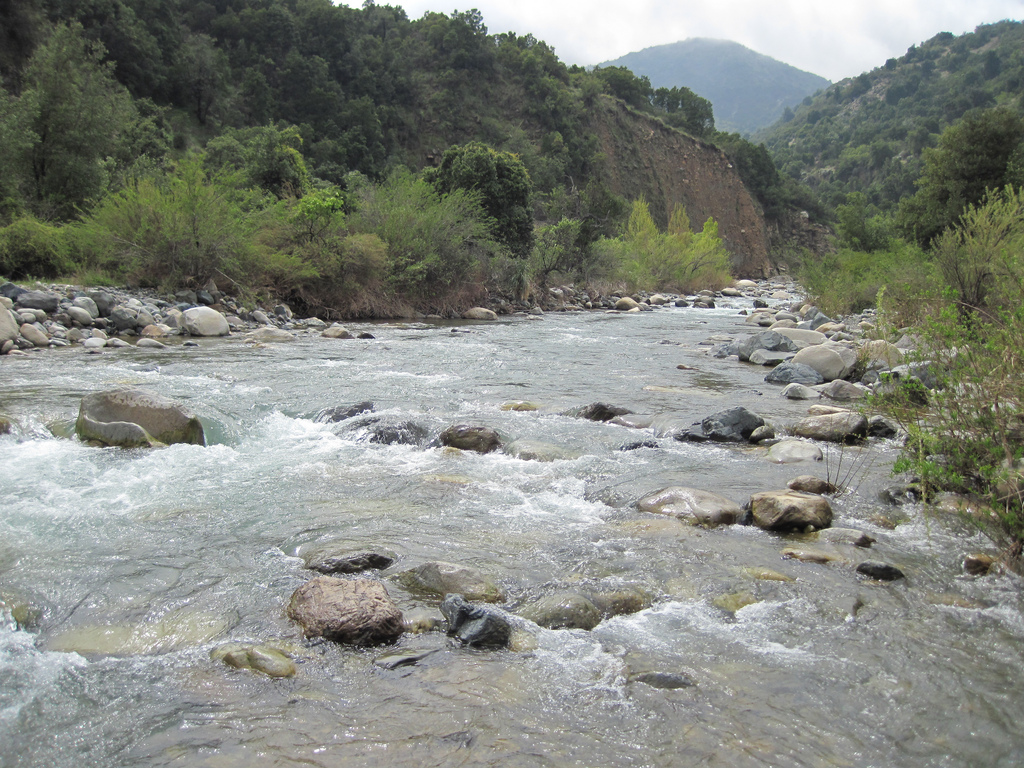
- View from the trail along Río Clarillo
- Interactive map of Río Clarillo National Park
- Location: Santiago Metropolitan Region
- Nearest city: Pirque
- Coordinates: 33°46′S 70°27′W
- Area: 101.85 km^{2} (39.32 sq mi)
- Established: 1982
- Governing body: Corporación Nacional Forestal (CONAF)

Río Clarillo National Park, also known as Río Clarillo National Reserve, is a protected area in the Santiago Metropolitan Region of central Chile. It is 45 kilometres (28 mi) southeast of Santiago.

It was created in 1982 to preserve the natural environment of central Chile and its native species, including the Cordilleran cypress (Austrocedrus chilensis).
