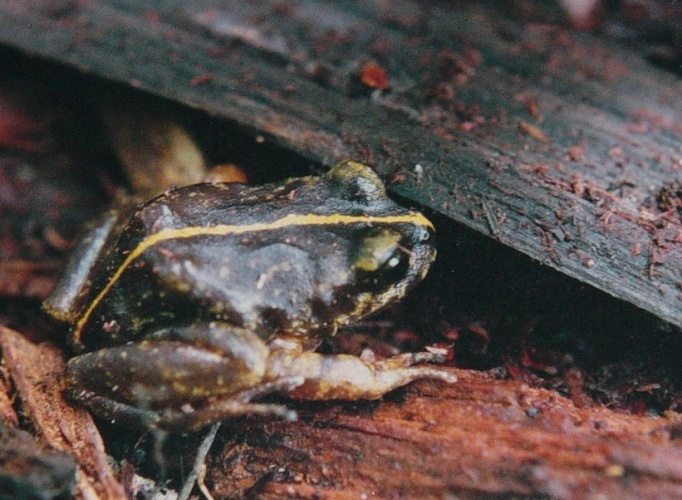
- E. emiliopugini

Scientific classification
- Kingdom: Animalia
- Phylum: Chordata
- Class: Amphibia
- Order: Anura
- Family: Alsodidae
- Genus: Eupsophus; Fitzinger, 1843

Type species
- Cystignathus roseus Duméril and Bibron, 1841

= Eupsophus =

Genus of amphibians

Eupsophus is a genus of frogs in the family Alsodidae. They are sometimes known as ground frogs. The genus is endemic to Patagonia (Chile and Argentina). Eupsophus is the second most species-rich frog genera of Patagonia. These frogs are restricted to forested areas at southern latitudes.

== Reproduction ==
In most species, the tadpoles are endotrophic (developing without external food sources) and develop in water housed in small hollows in the forest floor or holes at the end of flooded tunnels. Males call from inside burrows and may engage in duets with their nearest neighbours. They also show parental care: males remain by the clutch, and later on also by the tadpoles, in small aquatic microhabitats in the ground; this behaviour is associated with significant weight loss.

== Species ==
There are ten species in this genus:

- Eupsophus altor Nuñez, Rabanal, and Formas, 2012
- Eupsophus calcaratus (Günther, 1881)
- Eupsophus contulmoensis Ortiz, Ibarra-Vidal, and Formas, 1989
- Eupsophus emiliopugini Formas, 1989
- Eupsophus insularis (Philippi, 1902)
- Eupsophus migueli Formas, 1978
- Eupsophus nahuelbutensis Ortiz and Ibarra-Vidal, 1992
- Eupsophus roseus (Duméril and Bibron, 1841)
- Eupsophus septentrionalis Ibarra-Vidal, Ortiz, and Torres-Pérez, 2004
- Eupsophus vertebralis Grandison, 1961
