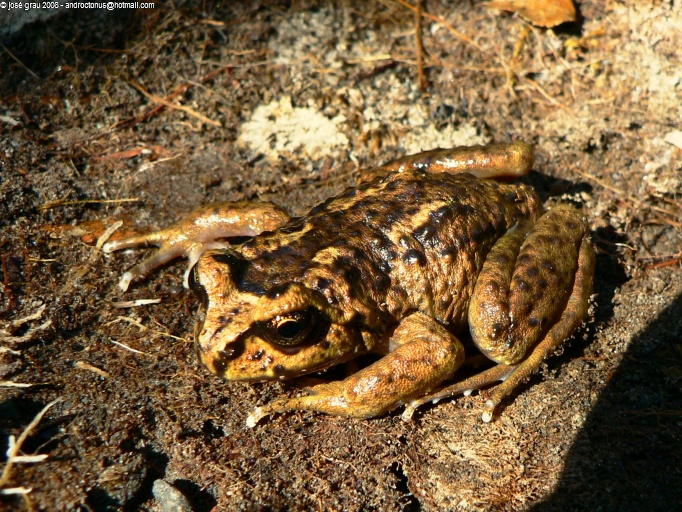
- Alsodes verrucosus

Scientific classification
- Kingdom: Animalia
- Phylum: Chordata
- Class: Amphibia
- Order: Anura
- Superfamily: Hyloidea
- Family: Alsodidae; Mivart, 1869

Type genus
- Alsodes Bell, 1843

Genera
- 3, see text.

Synonyms
- Alsodinae Mivart, 1869

= Alsodidae =

Family of amphibians

The Alsodidae are a small family of frogs from South America between Patagonia and southern Brazil. It contains 30 species in three genera. This family, along with several other families, used to be included in the family Leptodactylidae. It was then a subfamily in the family Cycloramphidae, before being recognized as a family first in 2011.

== Genera ==
The family contains three genera:

- Alsodes Bell, 1843 (19 species)
- Eupsophus Fitzinger, 1843 (10 species)
- Limnomedusa Fitzinger, 1843 (1 species)

However, the placement of Limnomedusa is highly uncertain, and it might belong to the family Cycloramphidae. In contrast, Alsodes+Eupsophus group (sensu stricto, after moving some species formerly included in the latter genus to other genera) forms a well-supported, monophyletic group. These genera are Patagonian endemics and represent the largest part of the amphibian diversity in that area. Eupsophus species are restricted to forested areas at southern latitudes, but some species of Alsodes reach the arid Andean slopes in central Chile and Argentina.

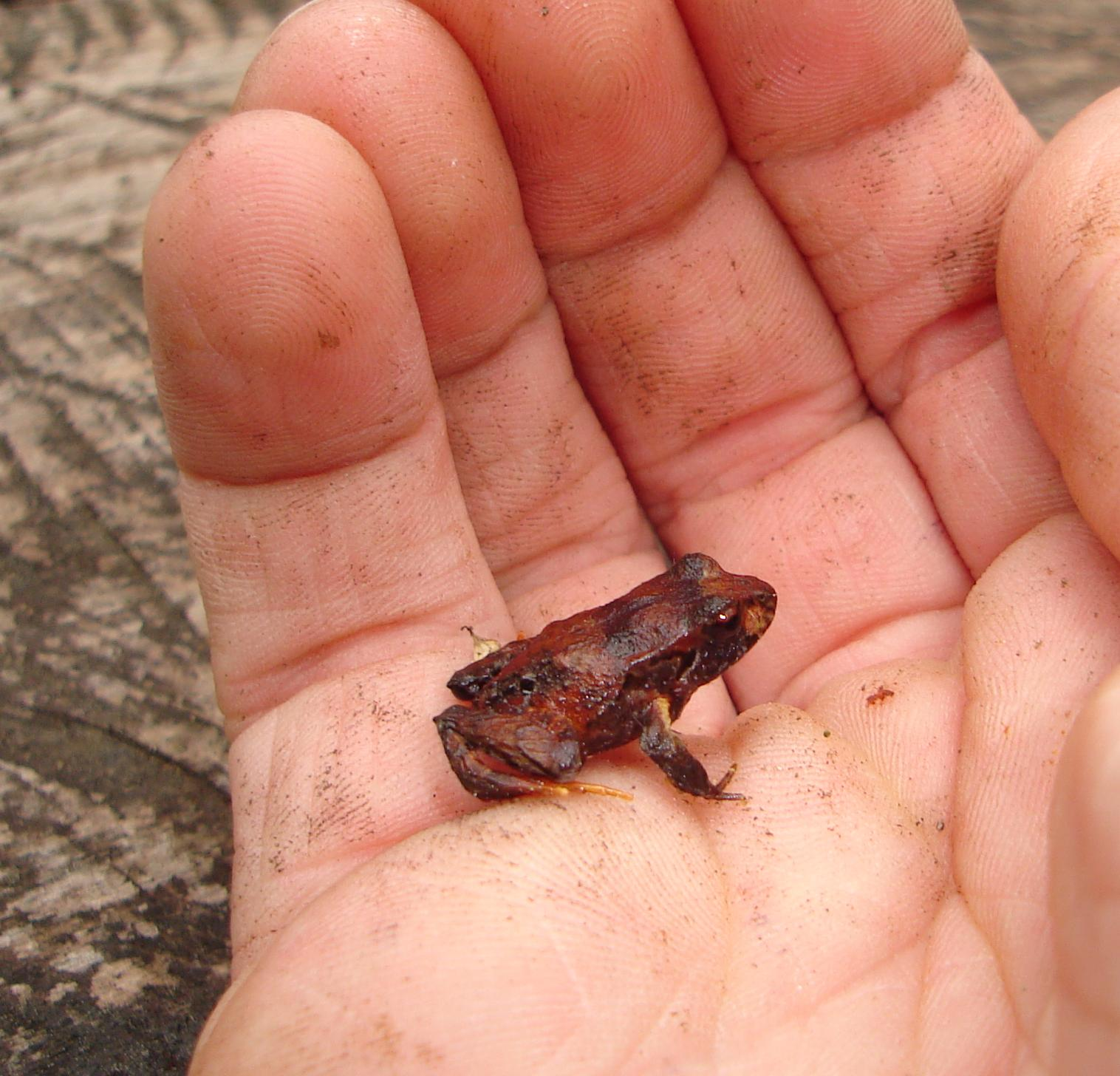
Eupsophus roseus
