= Spatuloricaria terracanticum =

Conservation status
- Least Concern (IUCN 3.1)

Scientific classification
- Kingdom: Animalia
- Phylum: Chordata
- Class: Actinopterygii
- Order: Siluriformes
- Family: Loricariidae
- Genus: Spatuloricaria
- Species: S. terracanticum

Binomial name
- Spatuloricaria terracanticum Londoño-Burbano, Urbano-Bonilla, Rojas-Molina, Ramírez-Gil & Prada-Pedreros, 2018

Species of catfish

Spatuloricaria terracanticum is a species of freshwater ray-finned fish belonging to the family Loricariidae, the suckermouth armored catfishes, and the subfamily Loricariinae, the mailed catfishes. This catfish occurs in the Orinoco basin in Colombia and Venezuela. It is typically found in environments at elevations of 197 to 350 m (646 to 1148 ft) above sea level with moderate slopes, turbid to slightly clear water, a conductivity of 30 to 302 μS/cm, oxygen concentration of 1.6 to 7.6 mg/L, oxygen saturation of 22.5% to 98.8%, pH of between 6.4 and 8.2, temperatures of 22.5 to 28.6 °C (72.5 to 83.5 °F), and substrates composed of rocks and sand. This species reaches a standard length of 28.6 cm (11.3 in).

Spatuloricaria terracanticum has been collected alongside several other species of fish, including Apteronotus apurensis, Apteronotus galvisi, Bujurquina mariae, Chaetostoma formosae, Chaetostoma joropo, Creagrutus bolivari, Farlowella mariaelenae, Gephyrocharax valencia, Hemibrycon metae, Lamontichthys llanero, and Odontostilbe splendida.

Spatuloricaria terracanticum was described in 2018 by Alejandro Londoño-Burbano (of the Federal University of Rio de Janeiro), Alexander Urbano-Bonilla (of the Pontifical Xavierian University in Colombia), Yecid Rojas (of the University of the Llanos in Colombia), Hernando Ramírez-Gil (also of the University of the Llanos), and Saúl Prada-Pedreros (also of the Pontifical Xavierian University). Its specific name, terracanticum, is derived from Latin and reportedly translates to "earth song", referring to the traditional work songs of the Llanos.
