= Chaetostoma sacramento =

Scientific classification
- Kingdom: Animalia
- Phylum: Chordata
- Class: Actinopterygii
- Division: Teleostei
- Order: Siluriformes
- Family: Loricariidae
- Genus: Chaetostoma
- Species: C. sacramento

Binomial name
- Chaetostoma sacramento Meza-Vargas, Ramirez, Lujan, 2024

Species of catfish

Chaetostoma sacramento is a species of freshwater ray-finned fish belonging to the family Loricariidae, the suckermouth armoured catfishes, and the subfamily Hypostominae, the suckermouth catfishes. This catfish is endemic to Peru.

== Taxonomy ==
Chaetostoma sacramento was first formally described in 2024 by the Peruvian ichthyologists Vanessa Meza-Vargas and Jorge L. Ramirez, and the American ichthyologist Nathan K. Lujan, with its type locality given as an unnamed left-bank tributary of the Aguaytia River in the Ucayali Basin at Shambillo, Boqueron District, Padre Abad Province, Ucayali Department in Peru. This species appears to be the sister species to C. branickii. Eschmeyer's Catalog of Fishes classifies the genus Chaetostoma in the subfamily Hypostominae, the suckermouth catfishes, within the suckermouth armored catfish family Loricariidae. It has also been classified in the tribe Ancistrini by some authorities.

== Etymology ==
Chaetostoma sacramento is a species in the genus Chaetostoma, this name combines chaeto, meaning "long hair" or "mane", although in biology it frequently is used to mean "britsle", with stoma, meaning "mouth". This is an allusion to the bristles on the cheeks of the males of many species belonging to this genus. The specific name, sacramento refers to the Pampa de Sacramento, a high plain in central Peru which is the only place this catfish is known to occur.

== Description ==
Chaetostom sacramento shows a combination of the following distinctive characters. It has clear white spots and vermiculations which vary is size between half and twice the diameter of the nostrils on a grey to brown background colour on the head. It also has highly variable, small to large clear white spots, vermiculations or bands on the body, a fully formed plain brown adipose fin, gold spots on the rays of the dorsal fin, of which there eight branched rays. It has curved odontode on the cheeks and there are two plates in front of the dorsal fin, they have a warty growth on the supraoccipital and the pelvic fin is inserted slightly to the rear posterior of dorsal fin insertion. This species reaches a standard length of 76.74 mm (3.021 in).

== Distribution ==
Chaetostom sacramento is endemic to Peru where it is known only to occur in rivers in the Pampa de Sacramento in the upper Amazon basin.
