= Chaetostoma aburrense =

Conservation status
- Data Deficient (IUCN 3.1)

Scientific classification
- Kingdom: Animalia
- Phylum: Chordata
- Class: Actinopterygii
- Order: Siluriformes
- Family: Loricariidae
- Genus: Chaetostoma
- Species: C. aburrense

Binomial name
- Chaetostoma aburrense (Posada, 1909)

Synonyms
- Hypostomus aburrensis Posada, 1909; Hypostomus aburrense Posada, 1909; Chaetostoma aburrensis (Posada, 1909)

Species of fish

Chaetostoma aburrense is a species of freshwater ray-finned fish belonging to the family Loricariidae, the suckermouth armoured catfishes, and the subfamily Hypostominae, the suckermouth catfishes. This catfish is endemic to Colombia where it is known from the basin of the Cauca River. The species is known only from its description wrotten in 1909 by the Colombian physician and biologist Andrés Posada-Arango with its type locality given as Medellín. The whereabouts of the holotype are currently unknown.
