= Transancistrus =

Scientific classification
- Kingdom: Animalia
- Phylum: Chordata
- Class: Actinopterygii
- Division: Teleostei
- Order: Siluriformes
- Family: Loricariidae
- Subfamily: Hypostominae
- Genus: Transancistrus; Lujan, Meza-Vargas & Barriga-S., 2015

Type species
- Cordylancistrus santarosensis M. Tan & Armbruster, 2012

Genus of fishes

Transancistrus is a genus of is a genus of freshwater ray-finned fishes belonging to the family Loricariidae, the suckermouth armored catfishes, and the subfamily Hypostominae, the suckermouth catfishes. The catfishes in this genus are found in Ecuador, where they occur in Pacific versant drainages. This genus is the sister taxon of the genus Andeancistrus and it has been suggested that these taxa were separated by the orogeny of the Andes.

== Species ==
Transancistrus contains the following currently recognized valid species:

- Transancistrus aequinoctialis (Pellegrin, 1909)
- Transancistrus santarosensis (M. Tan & Armbruster, 2012)
