= Chaetostoma platyrhynchus =

Conservation status
- Data Deficient (IUCN 3.1)

Scientific classification
- Kingdom: Animalia
- Phylum: Chordata
- Class: Actinopterygii
- Order: Siluriformes
- Family: Loricariidae
- Genus: Chaetostoma
- Species: C. platyrhynchus

Binomial name
- Chaetostoma platyrhynchus (Fowler, 1943)

Synonyms
- Hemiancistrus platyrhynchus Fowler, 1943; Peckoltia platyrhynchus (Fowler, 1943); Cordylancistrus platyrhynchus (Fowler, 1943); Chaetostoma platyrhyncha (Fowler, 1943)

Species of catfish

Chaetostoma platyrhynchus is a species of freshwater ray-finned fish belonging to the family Loricariidae, the suckermouth armoured catfishes, and the subfamily Hypostominae, the suckermouth catfishes. This catfish is endemic to Colombia. The species is known to be of disputed classification and spelling.

== Taxonomy ==
Chaetostoma platyrhynchus was first formally described as a species of Hemiancistrus by Henry Weed Fowler in 1943 with its type locality given as Florencia in the Orteguasa basin. It was subsequently moved to Peckoltia by Isaäc J. H. Isbrücker in 1980, and later moved to Cordylancistrus in 1996 by W. E. Burgess and L. Finley. In 2004, Jonathan W. Armbruster reclassified the species as a member of Chaetostoma, although FishBase and ITIS both refer to it as Cordylancistrus platyrhynchus, and neither source lists either of Armbruster's names (Chaetostoma platyrhynchus and C. platyrhyncha) for the species as a synonym. Eschmeyer's Catalog of Fishes classifies the genus Chaetostoma in the subfamily Hypostominae, the suckermouth catfishes, within the suckermouth armored catfish family Loricariidae. It has also been classified in the tribe Ancistrini by some authorities.

=== Spelling dispute ===
In his 2004 reclassification, Armbruster used platyrhyncha and platyrhynchus interchangeably when referring to the species. In 2008, Armbruster referred to the species as C. platyrhynchus rather than C. platyrhyncha, which became the standard spelling. Armbruster and Milton Tan referred to the species as C. platyrhyncha in their 2012 description of Cordylancistrus santarosensis (which has subsequently been reclassified as Transancistrus santarosensis), furthering the confusion surrounding the correct spelling of the name.

In 2016, Gustavo A. Ballen, Alexander Urbano-Bonilla and Javier A. Maldonado-Ocamporuled that changing the specific epithet to platyrhyncha or platyrhynchum to comply with the ICZN's name gender guidelines was not in this case justified and that the species should be referred to as Chaetostoma platyrhynchus.

== Description ==
Chaetostoma platyrhynchus reaches a total length of 9.5 cm (3.7 in).

== Distribution and habitat ==
Chaetostoma platyrhynchus is endemic to Colombia where it occurs in the upper Caqueta River and the Putumayo River, living in clear waters with a fast current.

== Conservation status ==
Chaetostoma platyrhynchus has been assessed as Data Deficient by the International Union for Conservation of Nature because there is insufficient data on its population size, trends and threats faced by this species,
