= Spatuloricaria tuira =

Conservation status
- Data Deficient (IUCN 3.1)

Scientific classification
- Kingdom: Animalia
- Phylum: Chordata
- Class: Actinopterygii
- Order: Siluriformes
- Family: Loricariidae
- Genus: Spatuloricaria
- Species: S. tuira

Binomial name
- Spatuloricaria tuira Fichberg, O. T. Oyakawa & de Pinna, 2014

Species of catfish

Spatuloricaria tuira, commonly known as Tuira's whiptail or the marbled Xingu whiptail, is a species of freshwater ray-finned fish belonging to the family Loricariidae, the suckermouth armored catfishes, and the subfamily Loricariinae, the mailed catfishes. This catfish occurs in the basins of the Xingu River and the Tapajós in the Brazilian states of Mato Grosso and Pará. It is typically seen at the bottom of medium to large rivers with fast water flow and substrates composed of rocks or sand. This species reaches a total length of 46 cm (18 in) and can weigh up to at least 130 g (4.6 oz).

Spatuloricaria tuira was described in 2014 by Ilana Fichberg (of the Federal University of São Paulo), Osvaldo Takeshi Oyakawa (of the University of São Paulo), and Mario de Pinna (also of the University of São Paulo). Its specific name, tuira, honors a Kayapo woman who "became a symbol of the resistance against the construction of hydroelectric dams on the Rio Xingu". It does not refer to the Tuira River, which, although not an area in which Spatuloricaria tuira occurs, is part of the native range of the related species S. fimbriata.
