= Andeancistrus platycephalus =

Conservation status
- Data Deficient (IUCN 3.1)

Scientific classification
- Kingdom: Animalia
- Phylum: Chordata
- Class: Actinopterygii
- Division: Teleostei
- Order: Siluriformes
- Family: Loricariidae
- Genus: Andeancistrus
- Species: A. platycephalus

Binomial name
- Andeancistrus platycephalus (Boulenger, 1898)

Synonyms
- Chaetostomus platycephalus Boulenger, 1898; Hemiancistrus platycephalus (Boulenger, 1898); Cordylancistrus platycephalus (Boulenger, 1898)

Species of ray-finned fish

Andeancistrus platycephalus of freshwater ray-finned fish belonging to the family Loricariidae, the suckermouth armoured catfishes, and the subfamily Hypostominae, the suckermouth catfishes. This catfish is endemism to Ecuador.

== Taxonomy ==
Andeancistrus platycephalus was first formally described as Chaetostomus platycephalus in 1898 by the belgian-born British ichthyologist George Albert Boulenger with its type locality given as the Bomboiza River in the upper Amazon basin in Ecuador. In 2015 this species was reclassified into the new genus Andeanancitrus by Nathan K. Lujan, Vanessa Meza-Vargas, and Ramiro Barriga-Salazar, alongside the newly described A. eschwartzae, with A. platycephalus designated as the type species. Eschmeyer's Catalog of Fishes classified the genus Andeancistrus in the subfamily Hypostominae, the suckermouth catfishes, within the suckermouth armored catfish family Loricariidae. It has also been classified in the tribe Ancistrini by some authorities.

== Etymology ==
Andeancistrus platycephalus is the type species of the genus Andeancistrus, a name which prefixes Andean, i.e. the Andes, onto the genus name Ancistrus. This name is thought to be from the Greek ágkistron, meaning a "fish hook" or the "hook of a spindle", a reference to the hooked odontodes on the interopercular bone, and is the root name of many genera in the subfamily Hypostominae. The specific name, platycephalus, means "flat head", a reference to the highly depressed head of this species.

== Description ==
Andeancistrus platycephalus has eight soft rays in its dorsal fin and three in its anal fin. This species can be told apart from its only congener, A. eschwartzae, by having a pale grey ground colour on the head and body, as opposed to black to dark grey. It also has white or blue regular round spots which are evenly distributed across the head, sides and back and on the fin rays. A. eschwartzae also has clusters of odontodes forming keels on most of the plates on the lateral line. The maximum standard length is 14.5 cm (5.7 in).

== Distribution ==
Andeancistrus platycephalus is endemic to Ecuador where it is found in the Amazon basin, in the drainage of the Zamora River, part of the Marañón River river system.
