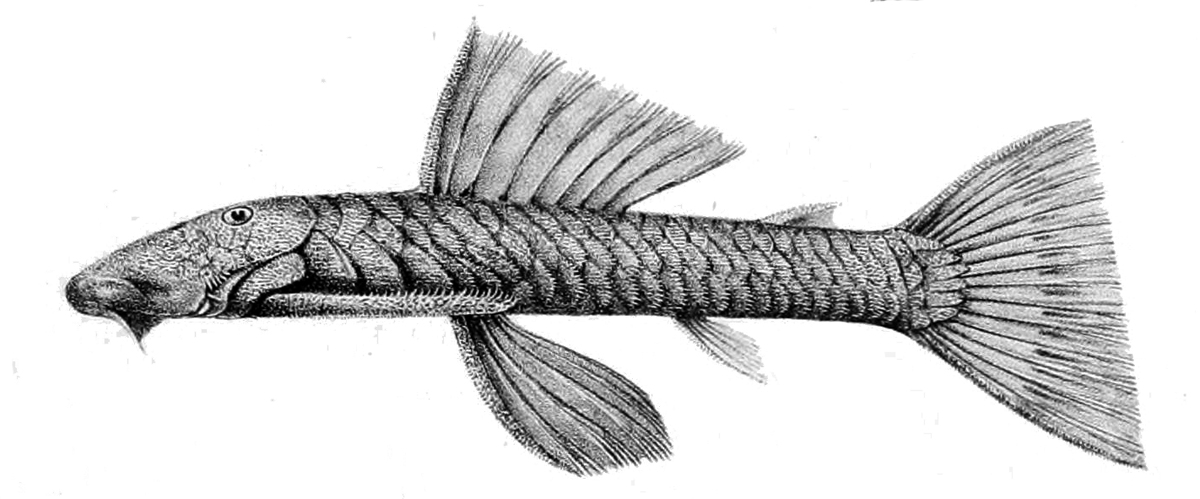

Conservation status
- Least Concern (IUCN 3.1)

Scientific classification
- Kingdom: Animalia
- Phylum: Chordata
- Class: Actinopterygii
- Order: Siluriformes
- Family: Loricariidae
- Genus: Chaetostoma
- Species: C. thomsoni

Binomial name
- Chaetostoma thomsoni Regan, 1904

Synonyms
- Chaetostomus thomsoni Regan, 1904

= Chaetostoma thomsoni =

Species of fish

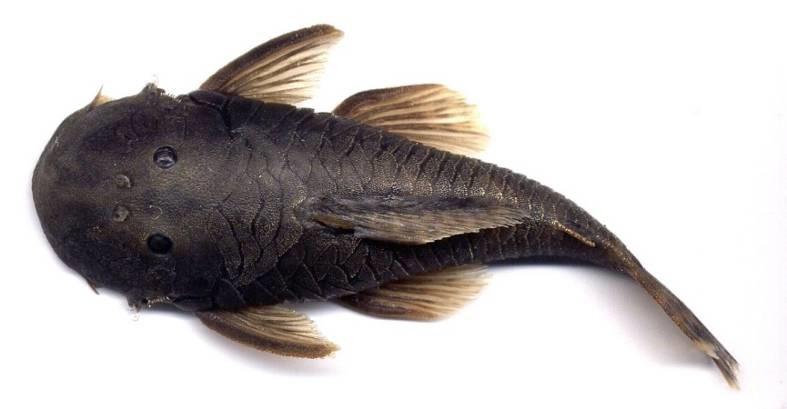
An illustration of C. thomsoni.

Chaetostoma thomsoni is a species of freshwater ray-finned fish belonging to the family Loricariidae, the suckermouth armoured catfishes, and the subfamily Hypostominae, the suckermouth catfishes. This catfish is endemic to Colombia where it occurs in the drainages of the Magdalena, Sinú, Cesar and Cauca rivers. This species reaches a standard length of 15.1 cm (5.9 in). The specific name, thomsoni, honours the collector of the holotype, Kay Thomson.
