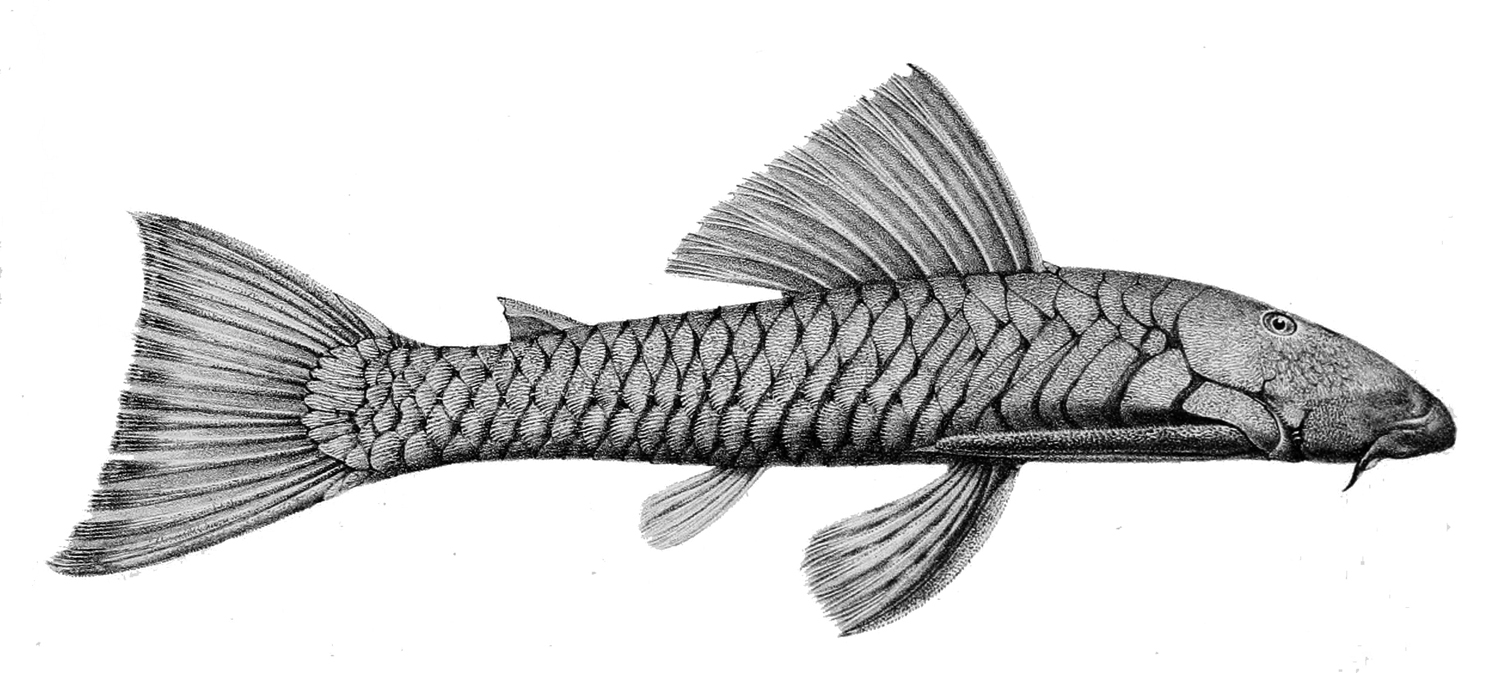

Conservation status
- Least Concern (IUCN 3.1)

Scientific classification
- Kingdom: Animalia
- Phylum: Chordata
- Class: Actinopterygii
- Order: Siluriformes
- Family: Loricariidae
- Genus: Chaetostoma
- Species: C. marginatum

Binomial name
- Chaetostoma marginatum Regan, 1904

Synonyms
- Chaetostomus marginatus Regan, 1904

= Chaetostoma marginatum =

Species of catfish

Chaetostoma marginatum is a species of freshwater ray-finned fish belonging to the family Loricariidae, the suckermouth armoured catfishes, and the subfamily Hypostominae, the suckermouth catfishes. This catfish is found in South America, where it occurs in Esmereldas and Guayas drainages in Ecuador. It has also been recorded in the Magdalena River basin, as well as in the Baudo, San Juan and Anchicaya Rivers in Colombia, although these record s still require confirmation. This species reaches a standard length of 19 cm (7.5 in).
