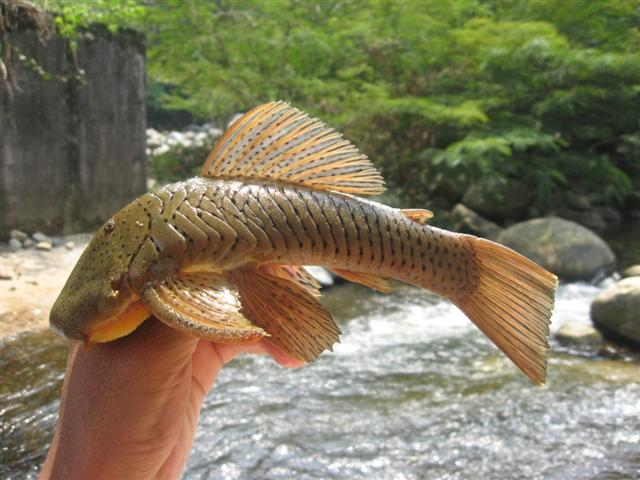

Conservation status
- Least Concern (IUCN 3.1)

Scientific classification
- Kingdom: Animalia
- Phylum: Chordata
- Class: Actinopterygii
- Order: Siluriformes
- Family: Loricariidae
- Genus: Chaetostoma
- Species: C. milesi

Binomial name
- Chaetostoma milesi Fowler, 1941

Synonyms
- Chaetostomus milesi Fowler, 1941

= Chaetostoma milesi =

Species of catfish

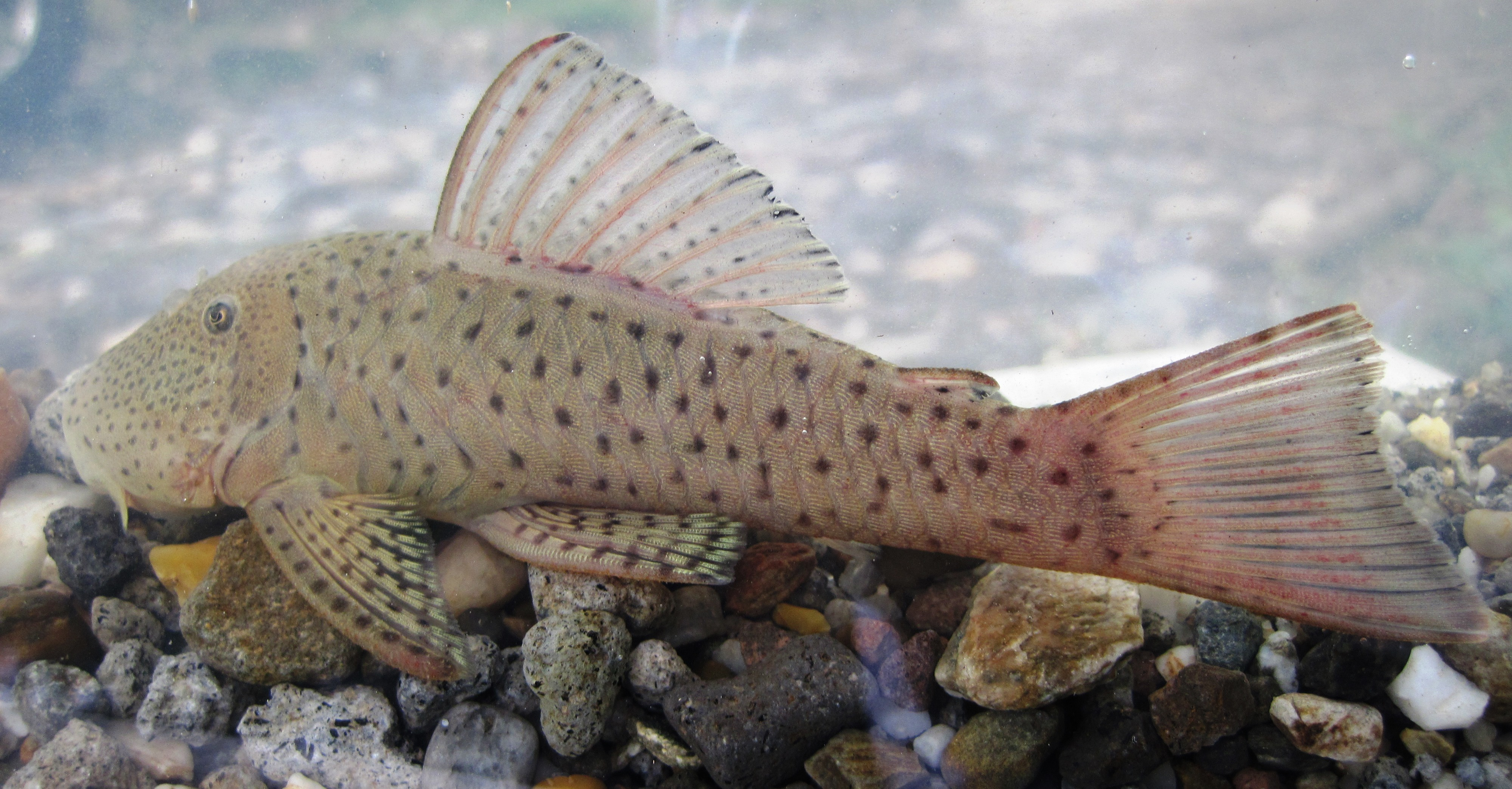
An individual of C. milesi.

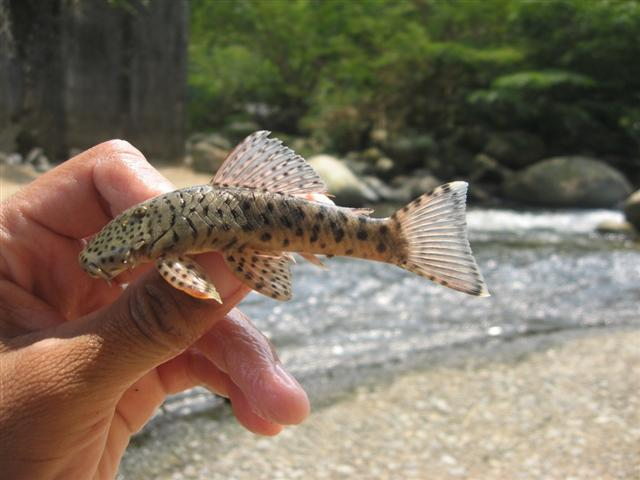
Another individual of C. milesi removed from water.

Chaetostoma milesi is a species of freshwater ray-finned fish belonging to the family Loricariidae, the suckermouth armoured catfishes, and the subfamily Hypostominae, the suckermouth catfishes. This catfish is found in South America, where it occurs in the Andean rivers of Colombia and Venezuela. This species reaches a standard length of 14.6 cm (5.7 in). C. milesi was described in 1941 by the American biologist Henry Weed Fowler with its type locality given as Honda, Colombia. The specific name honours Cecil W. Miles, the secretary of the Dorada Railway in Mariquita, Tolima, who was also an ichthyologist. It appears in the aquarium trade, where it is most frequently referred to as either the bulldog pleco or the rubbernose pleco.
