= Spatuloricaria nudiventris =

Conservation status
- Data Deficient (IUCN 3.1)

Scientific classification
- Kingdom: Animalia
- Phylum: Chordata
- Class: Actinopterygii
- Order: Siluriformes
- Family: Loricariidae
- Genus: Spatuloricaria
- Species: S. nudiventris

Binomial name
- Spatuloricaria nudiventris (Valenciennes, 1840)

Synonyms
- Loricaria nudiventris Valenciennes, 1840

Species of catfish

Spatuloricaria nudiventris is a species of freshwater ray-finned fish belonging to the family Loricariidae, the suckermouth armored catfishes, and the subfamily Loricariinae, the mailed catfishes. This catfish is a species inquirenda which is known only from the holotype which was said to be collected in the São Francisco River in Brazil but the species has not subsequently been recorded there so this is thought to be an error. This species reaches a standard length 20.4 cm (8.0 in)..
