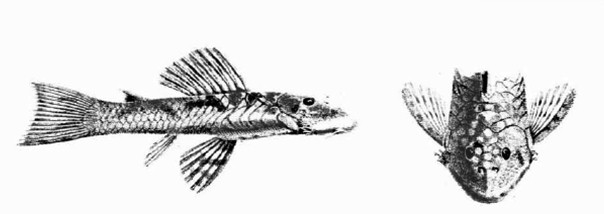

Scientific classification
- Kingdom: Animalia
- Phylum: Chordata
- Class: Actinopterygii
- Order: Siluriformes
- Family: Loricariidae
- Genus: Chaetostoma
- Species: C. guairense

Binomial name
- Chaetostoma guairense Steindachner, 1881

Synonyms
- Chaetostomus guairensis Steindachner, 1881

= Chaetostoma guairense =

Species of fish

Chaetostoma guairense is a species of freshwater ray-finned fish belonging to the family Loricariidae, the suckermouth armoured catfishes, and the subfamily Hypostominae, the suckermouth catfishes. This catfish is endemic to Venezuela where it is known from the drainages basins of the Guaire River, Tuy River and Lake Valencia. This species recahes a standard length of8.1 cm (3.2 in).
