= Chaetostoma sovichthys =

Conservation status
- Least Concern (IUCN 3.1)

Scientific classification
- Kingdom: Animalia
- Phylum: Chordata
- Class: Actinopterygii
- Order: Siluriformes
- Family: Loricariidae
- Genus: Chaetostoma
- Species: C. sovichthys

Binomial name
- Chaetostoma sovichthys L. P. Schultz, 1944

Synonyms
- Chaetostoma anomala sovichthys Schultz, 1944

Species of fish

Chaetostoma sovichthys is a species of freshwater ray-finned fish belonging to the family Loricariidae, the suckermouth armoured catfishes, and the subfamily Hypostominae, the suckermouth catfishes. This catfish is found in Venezuela and Colombia, in the higher parts of the Lake Maracaibo basin and the upper basin of the Magdalena River. C. sovichthys reaches a standard length of 7.2 cm (2.8 in). This species reportedly prefers a pH of 6.0 to 7.0 and a temperature of 23 to 27 °C (73 to 80 °F).
