= Chaetostoma paucispinis =

Conservation status
- Data Deficient (IUCN 3.1)

Scientific classification
- Kingdom: Animalia
- Phylum: Chordata
- Class: Actinopterygii
- Order: Siluriformes
- Family: Loricariidae
- Genus: Chaetostoma
- Species: C. paucispinis

Binomial name
- Chaetostoma paucispinis Regan, 1912

Synonyms
- Chaetostomus paucispinis Regan, 1912

Species of catfish

Chaetostoma paucispinisis a species of freshwater ray-finned fish belonging to the family Loricariidae, the suckermouth armoured catfishes, and the subfamily Hypostominae, the suckermouth catfishes.. This catfish is endemic to Colombia where it is nown only from its type locality of Tadó on the San Juan River in Chocó Department. This species reaches a total length of 9 cm (3.5 in). The International Union for Conservation of Nature classifies this species as Data Deficient because it is known only from its type locality and it is not known how local farming and mining activities have affected this location.
