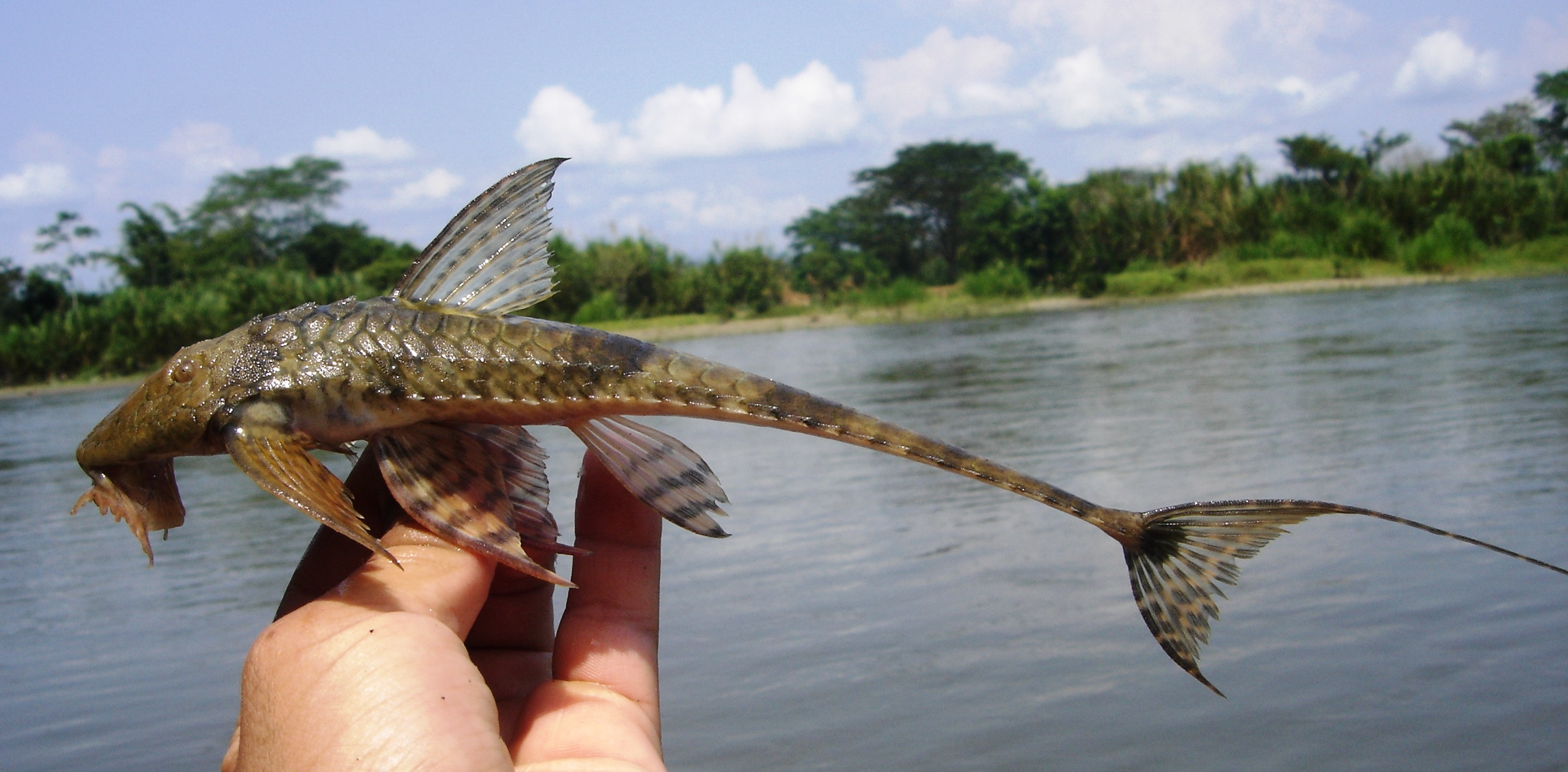

Conservation status
- Least Concern (IUCN 3.1)

Scientific classification
- Kingdom: Animalia
- Phylum: Chordata
- Class: Actinopterygii
- Order: Siluriformes
- Family: Loricariidae
- Genus: Spatuloricaria
- Species: S. gymnogaster

Binomial name
- Spatuloricaria gymnogaster (C. H. Eigenmann & Vance, 1912)

Synonyms
- Loricaria gymnogaster C. H. Eigenmann & Vance, 1912

= Spatuloricaria gymnogaster =

Species of catfish

Spatuloricaria gymnogaster is a species of is a species of freshwater ray-finned fish belonging to the family Loricariidae, the suckermouth armored catfishes, and the subfamily Loricariinae, the mailed catfishes. This catfish occurs in the upper Magdalena River basin in Colombia.

FishBase records a maximum standard length of 370 cm (146 in) for the species, but this is unlikely and can be assumed to be a misprint, with 37.0 cm (14.6 in) being the actual upper bound stated in the reference cited. Some sources list a standard length of 25 cm (9.8 in) for Spatuloricaria gymnogaster, and FishBase provides a maximum weight of 235.3 g.
