= Andeancistrus =

Scientific classification
- Kingdom: Animalia
- Phylum: Chordata
- Class: Actinopterygii
- Order: Siluriformes
- Family: Loricariidae
- Subfamily: Hypostominae
- Genus: Andeancistrus; Lujan, Meza-Vargas & Barriga-S., 2015

Type species
- Chaetostomus platycephalus Boulenger, 1898

Genus of fishes

Andeancistrus is a genus of freshwater ray-finned fish belonging to the family Loricariidae, the suckermouth armoured catfishes, and the subfamily Hypostominae, the suckermouth catfishes. This genus is diagnosable from all other members of the Chaetostoma group by having a fully plated snout, lacking cheek odontodes that extend past the opercular flap, and by having eight branched dorsal fin rays.

== Species ==
Andeancistrus contains the following valid species:

- Andeancistrus eschwartzae Lujan, Meza-Vargas & Barriga-S., 2015
- Andeancistrus platycephalus (Boulenger, 1898)
