= Chaetostoma brevilabiatum =

Conservation status
- Least Concern (IUCN 3.1)

Scientific classification
- Kingdom: Animalia
- Phylum: Chordata
- Class: Actinopterygii
- Order: Siluriformes
- Family: Loricariidae
- Genus: Chaetostoma
- Species: C. brevilabiatum

Binomial name
- Chaetostoma brevilabiatum Dahl, 1941

Synonyms
- Chaetostomus brevilabiatus Dahl, 1941

Species of catfish

Chaetostoma brevilabiatum is a species of freshwater ray-finned fish belonging to the family Loricariidae, the suckermouth armoured catfishes, and the subfamily Hypostominae, the suckermouth catfishes. This catfish is endemic to Colombia where it occurs in the drainage basins of the Magdalena and Cimitarra Rivers. It occurs in clear streams with a fast current where there is a rocky substrate and feeds on detritus. This species reaches a standard length of 11.9 cm (4.7 in).
