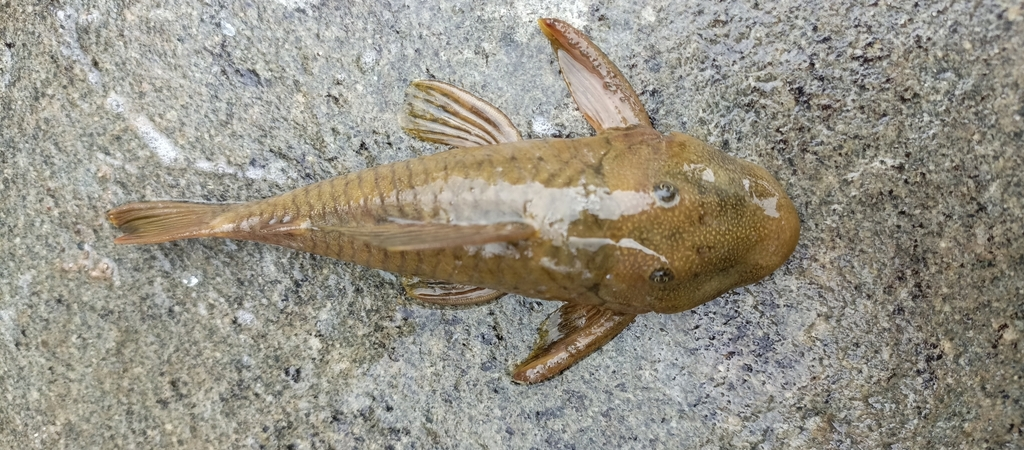

Scientific classification
- Kingdom: Animalia
- Phylum: Chordata
- Class: Actinopterygii
- Order: Siluriformes
- Family: Loricariidae
- Genus: Chaetostoma
- Species: C. bifurcum

Binomial name
- Chaetostoma bifurcum Lujan, Meza-Vargas, Astudillo-Clavijo, Barriga-S. & López-Fernández, 2015

= Chaetostoma bifurcum =

Species of catfish

Chaetostoma bifurcum is a species of freshwater ray-finned fish belonging to the family Loricariidae, the suckermouth armoured catfishes, and the subfamily Hypostominae, the suckermouth catfishes. This catfish is found in western South America in Pacific draining rivers in western Ecuador and northwestern Peru, including the Esmeraldas, Guayas, Santa Rosa and Tumbes basins. This catfish reaches a standard length of 14 cm (5.5 in).
