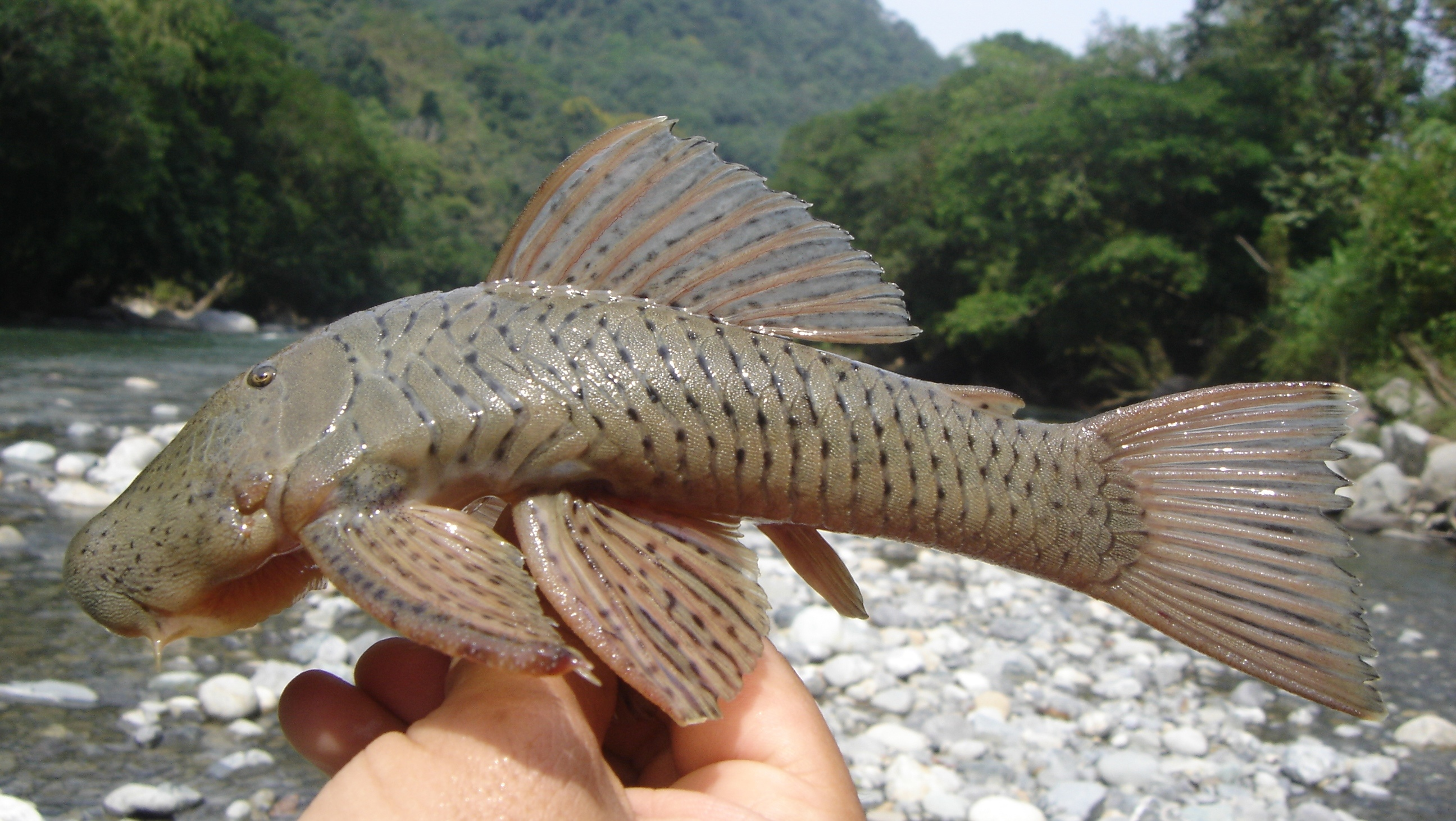

Conservation status
- Least Concern (IUCN 3.1)

Scientific classification
- Kingdom: Animalia
- Phylum: Chordata
- Class: Actinopterygii
- Order: Siluriformes
- Family: Loricariidae
- Genus: Chaetostoma
- Species: C. fischeri

Binomial name
- Chaetostoma fischeri Steindachner, 1879

Synonyms
- Chaetostomus fischeri Steindachner, 1879

= Chaetostoma fischeri =

Species of catfish

Chaetostoma fischeri is a species of freshwater ray-finned fish belonging to the family Loricariidae, the suckermouth armoured catfishes, and the subfamily Hypostominae, the suckermouth catfishes. This catfish is considered to have a wide distribution in Central and northern South America, occurring in Panama and Colombia, but studies have indicated that this is a species complex with C. fischeri sensu stricto restricted to the Chagres and Bayano Rivers in Panama, and may be the Baudó River in Colombia. This species reaches a total length of 30 cm (12 in). The specific name honours Franz Steindachner's friend W. Fischer, who gave Steindachner a collection of river fishes from Panama, which included the holotype of C. fischeri.
