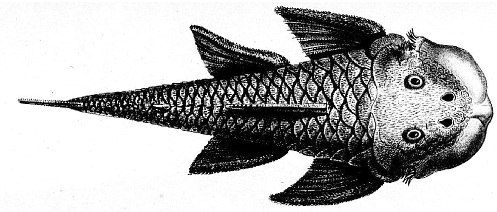
- Chaetostoma loborhynchos

Scientific classification
- Kingdom: Animalia
- Phylum: Chordata
- Class: Actinopterygii
- Order: Siluriformes
- Family: Loricariidae
- Subfamily: Hypostominae
- Genus: Chaetostoma; Tschudi, 1846

Type species
- Chaetostoma loborhynchos Tschudi 1846

Synonyms
- Lipopterichthys Norman, 1935; Loraxichthys Salcedo, 2013

= Chaetostoma =

Genus of fishes

Chaetostoma, also known as the bristlemouth catfish, is a genus of is a species of freshwater ray-finned fish belonging to the family Loricariidae, the suckermouth armoured catfishes, and the subfamily Hypostominae, the suckermouth catfishes. The catfishes in this genus are found in South America with one species, C. fischeri, extending into Panama. Most species inhabit flowing rivers in the lower Andes and its foothills. Some species are kept in unheated aquaria.

== Species ==
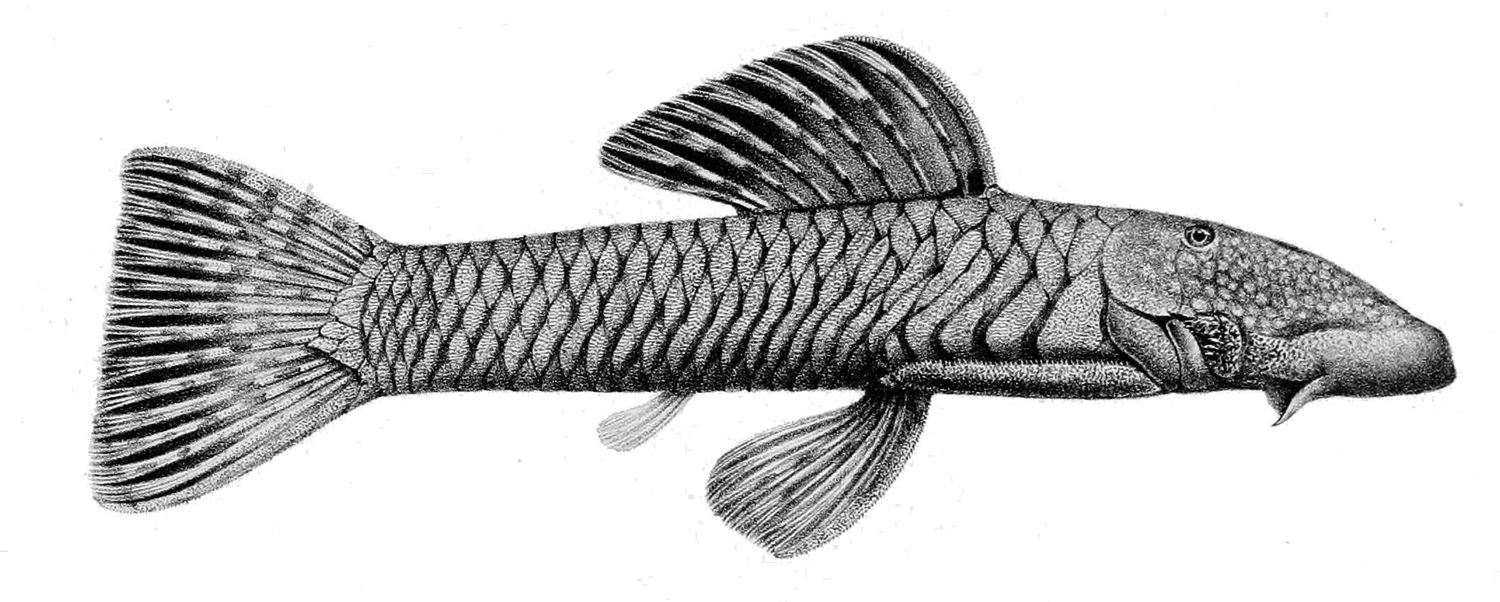
Chaetostoma anomalum

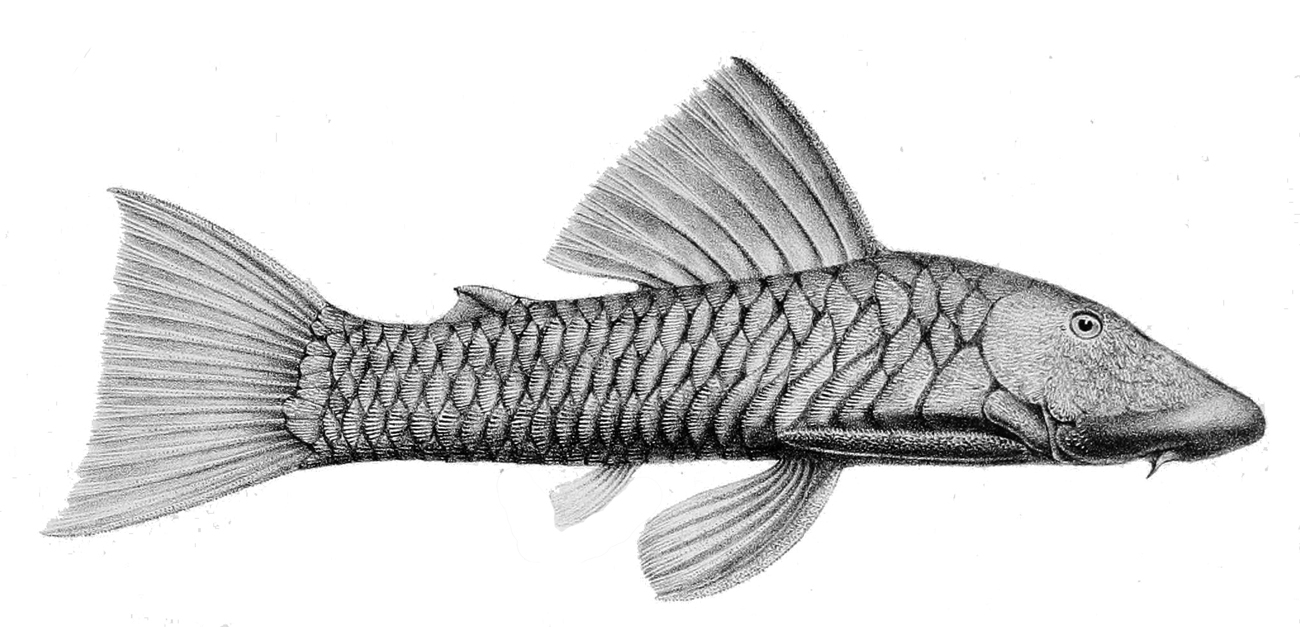
Chaetostoma breve

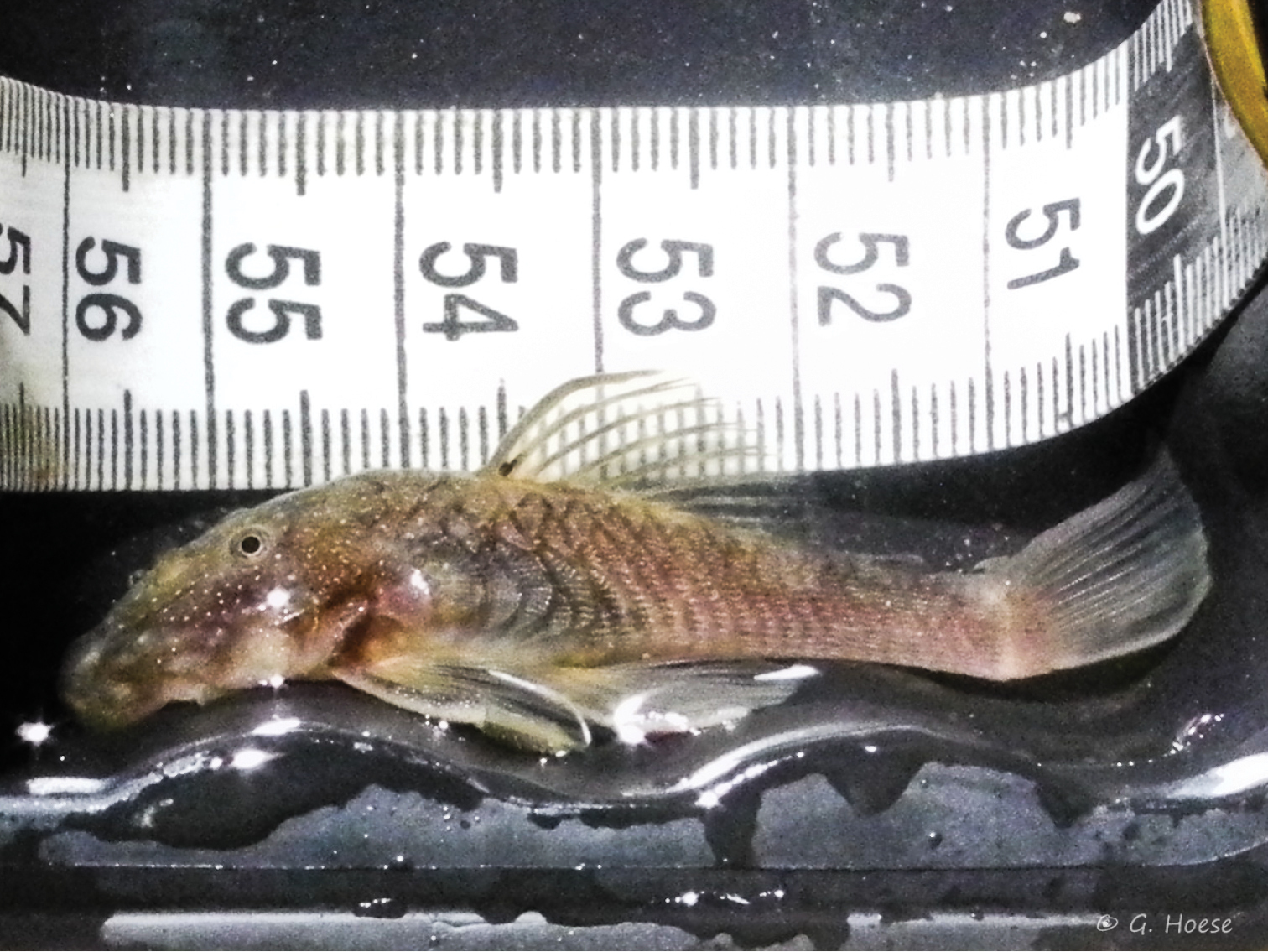
Chaetostoma microps

Chaetostoma contains the following valid species:

- Chaetostoma aburrense (Posada, 1909)
- Chaetostoma anale (Fowler, 1943)
- Chaetostoma anomalum Regan, 1903
- Chaetostoma bifurcum Lujan, Meza-Vargas, Astudillo-Clavijo, Barriga Salazar & López-Fernández, 2015
- Chaetostoma branickii Steindachner, 1881
- Chaetostoma brevilabiatum Dahl, 1941
- Chaetostoma carrioni (Norman, 1935)
- Chaetostoma changae Salcedo, 2006
- Chaetostoma chimu Urbano-Bonilla & Ballen, 2021
- Chaetostoma daidalmatos Salcedo, 2006
- Chaetostoma dermorhynchus Boulenger, 1887
- Chaetostoma dorsale C. H. Eigenmann, 1922
- Chaetostoma dupouii Fernández-Yépez, 1945
- Chaetostoma fischeri Steindachner, 1879
- Chaetostoma floridablancaense Ardila Rodríguez, 2013
- Chaetostoma formosae Ballen, 2011
- Chaetostoma guairense Steindachner, 1881
- Chaetostoma joropo Ballen, Urbano-Bonilla & Maldonado-Ocampo, 2016
- Chaetostoma lepturum Regan, 1912
- Chaetostoma leucomelas C. H. Eigenmann, 1918
- Chaetostoma lexa (Salcedo, 2013)
- Chaetostoma lineopunctatum C. H. Eigenmann & Allen, 1942
- Chaetostoma loborhynchos Tschudi, 1846
- Chaetostoma machiquense Fernández-Yépez & Martín Salazar, 1953
- Chaetostoma marginatum Regan, 1904
- Chaetostoma marmorescens C. H. Eigenmann & Allen, 1942
- Chaetostoma microps Günther, 1864
- Chaetostoma milesi Fowler, 1941
- Chaetostoma niveum Fowler, 1944
- Chaetostoma nudirostre Lütken, 1874
- Chaetostoma orientale Meza-Vargas, Calegari, Lujan, Ballen, Oyakawa, Sousa, Rapp Py-Daniel & Reis, 2022
- Chaetostoma palmeri Regan, 1912
- Chaetostoma patiae Fowler, 1945
- Chaetostoma paucispinis Regan, 1912
- Chaetostoma pearsei C. H. Eigenmann, 1920
- Chaetostoma platyrhynchus (Fowler, 1943)
- Chaetostoma sacramento Meza-Vargas, Ramirez & Lujan, 2024
- Chaetostoma sovichthys Schultz, 1944
- Chaetostoma spondylus Salcedo & Ortega, 2015
- Chaetostoma stannii Lütken, 1874
- Chaetostoma stroumpoulos Salcedo, 2006
- Chaetostoma tachiraense Schultz, 1944
- Chaetostoma thomsoni Regan, 1904
- Chaetostoma trimaculineum Lujan, Meza-Vargas, Astudillo-Clavijo, Barriga Salazar & López-Fernández 2015
- Chaetostoma vasquezi Lasso & Provenzano, 1998
- Chaetostoma venezuelae (Schultz, 1944)
- Chaetostoma yurubiense Ceas & Page, 1996
