= Spatuloricaria caquetae =

Conservation status
- Data Deficient (IUCN 3.1)

Scientific classification
- Kingdom: Animalia
- Phylum: Chordata
- Class: Actinopterygii
- Order: Siluriformes
- Family: Loricariidae
- Genus: Spatuloricaria
- Species: S. caquetae

Binomial name
- Spatuloricaria caquetae (Fowler, 1943)

Synonyms
- Loricaria caquetae Fowler, 1943

Species of catfish

Spatuloricaria caquetae, sometimes known as the longtail pleco, is a species of freshwater ray-finned fish belonging to the family Loricariidae, the suckermouth armored catfishes, and the subfamily Loricariinae, the mailed catfishes. This catfish occurs in the Orteguaza River basin in Colombia. This species reaches 37 cm (15 in) in length.
