= Chaetostoma daidalmatos =

Conservation status
- Endangered (IUCN 3.1)

Scientific classification
- Kingdom: Animalia
- Phylum: Chordata
- Class: Actinopterygii
- Division: Teleostei
- Order: Siluriformes
- Family: Loricariidae
- Genus: Chaetostoma
- Species: C. daidalmatos

Binomial name
- Chaetostoma daidalmatos Salcedo, 2006

Species of catfish

Chaetostoma daidalmatos is a species of freshwater ray-finned fish belonging to the family Loricariidae, the suckermouth armoured catfishes, and the subfamily Hypostominae, the suckermouth catfishes. This species is endemic to Peru and is known only from its type locality of the Huallaga River in the vicinity of Tingo María in Leoncio Prado province in Huánuco Department. The species was described alongside the species Chaetostoma stroumpoulos in 2006 by Norma J. Salcedo on the basis of distinctive morphology and coloration. This species reaches a standard length of 154 mm (6.1 in). The International Union for Conservation of Nature have assessed that this species is Endangered because it has a restricted range and its habitats are threatened by deforestation, agriculture and poluution, including pollution from mining and the spraying by herbicides on illegal coca plantations by the authorities.
