= Chaetostoma palmeri =

Conservation status
- Endangered (IUCN 3.1)

Scientific classification
- Kingdom: Animalia
- Phylum: Chordata
- Class: Actinopterygii
- Order: Siluriformes
- Family: Loricariidae
- Genus: Chaetostoma
- Species: C. palmeri

Binomial name
- Chaetostoma palmeri Regan, 1912

Synonyms
- Chaetostomus palmeri Regan, 1912

Species of catfish

Chaetostoma palmeri is a species of freshwater ray-finned fish belonging to the family Loricariidae, the suckermouth armoured catfishes, and the subfamily Hypostominae, the suckermouth catfishes. This catfish is endemic to Colombia where it is only known from its type locality in the Tamaná River in the San Juan River drainage, in Chocó Department. This species reaches a total length of 9.5 cm (3.7 in). The specific name, palmeri, honours Mervyn George Palmer, an English naturalist, traveller and specimen collector in the Neotropics for the British Museum (Natural History), the collector of the holotype.
