= Chaetostoma vasquezi =

Conservation status
- Least Concern (IUCN 3.1)

Scientific classification
- Kingdom: Animalia
- Phylum: Chordata
- Class: Actinopterygii
- Division: Teleostei
- Order: Siluriformes
- Family: Loricariidae
- Genus: Chaetostoma
- Species: C. vasquezi

Binomial name
- Chaetostoma vasquezi Lasso & Provenzano, 1998

Species of fish

Chaetostoma vasquezi is a species of freshwater ray-finned fish belonging to the family Loricariidae, the suckermouth armoured catfishes, and the subfamily Hypostominae, the suckermouth catfishes. This catfish is endemic to Venezuela, where it occurs on the Guiana Shield in the drainages of the Caura River and Caroní Rivers, tributaries of the Orinoco. This species reaches a standard length of 18.7 cm (7.4 in). The specific name, vasquezi, honours the Venezuelan hydrobiologist Enrique Vásquez for his contributions to limnology in Venezuela.
