= Chaetostoma niveum =

Conservation status
- Least Concern (IUCN 3.1)

Scientific classification
- Kingdom: Animalia
- Phylum: Chordata
- Class: Actinopterygii
- Order: Siluriformes
- Family: Loricariidae
- Genus: Chaetostoma
- Species: C. niveum

Binomial name
- Chaetostoma niveum Fowler, 1944

Species of catfish

Chaetostoma niveum is a species of freshwater ray-finned fish belonging to the family Loricariidae, the suckermouth armoured catfishes, and the subfamily Hypostominae, the suckermouth catfishes. This catfish is endemic to Colombia where it occurs in the lear waters of the Jurubidá River in Nuquí. This species reaches a standard length of 9.1 cm (3.6 in).
