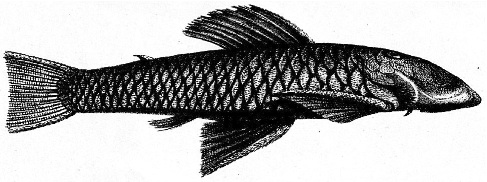

Conservation status
- Endangered (IUCN 3.1)

Scientific classification
- Kingdom: Animalia
- Phylum: Chordata
- Class: Actinopterygii
- Order: Siluriformes
- Family: Loricariidae
- Genus: Chaetostoma
- Species: C. loborhynchos

Binomial name
- Chaetostoma loborhynchos Tschudi, 1846

= Chaetostoma loborhynchos =

Species of fish

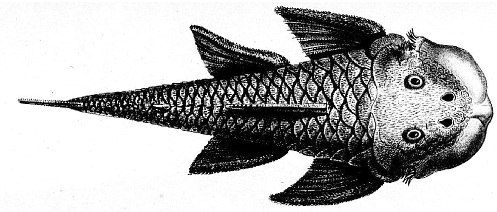
An illustration of C. loborhynchos viewed from above.

Chaetostoma loborhynchos is a species of freshwater ray-finned fish belonging to the family Loricariidae, the suckermouth armoured catfishes, and the subfamily Hypostominae, the suckermouth catfishes. This catfish is endemic to Peru where it occurs in the upper Tulumayo River, in Junin, and the upper Paucartambo River, in Pasco, both in the upper Ucayali River basin, This species reaches a standard length of 14.2 cm (5.6 in). This species was first formally described in 1846 by the Swiss naturalist, explorer and diplomat Johann Jakob von Tschudi, Tschudi also described the monospecific genus Chaetostoma when he described this species meaning that C. loborhynchos is the type species of that genus by monotypy. The International Union for Conservation of Nature assess this species as Endangered because has a restricted range and its habitat is threatened by a hydroelectric dam, deforestation, a cement factory and mining.
