= Andeancistrus eschwartzae =

Scientific classification
- Kingdom: Animalia
- Phylum: Chordata
- Class: Actinopterygii
- Order: Siluriformes
- Family: Loricariidae
- Genus: Andeancistrus
- Species: A. eschwartzae

Binomial name
- Andeancistrus eschwartzae Lujan, Meza-Vargas & Barriga-S., 2015

Species of fish

Andeancistrus eschwartzae of freshwater ray-finned fish belonging to the family Loricariidae, the suckermouth armoured catfishes, and the subfamily Hypostominae, the suckermouth catfishes. This catfish is endemism to Ecuador.

== Taxonomy ==
Andeancistrus eschwartzae was first formally described in 2015 by the ichthyologists Nathan Keller Lujan, Sonia Vanessa Meza-Vargas and Ramiro Edmundo Barriga-Salazar with its type locality given as Morona-Santiago Province, Palora Canton, Sangay Sector, Pastaza River drainage, Amundalo River in Ecuador. Eschmeyer's Catalog of Fishes classified the genus Andeancistrus in the subfamily Hypostominae, the suckermouth catfishes, within the suckermouth armored catfish family Loricariidae. It has also been classified in the tribe Ancistrini by some authorities.

== Etymology ==
Andeancistrus eschwartzae is one of two species in the genus Andeancistrus, a name which prefixes Andean, i.e. the Andes, onto the genus name Ancistrus. This name is thought to be from the Greek ágkistron, meaning a "fish hook" or the "hook of a spindle", a reference to the hooked odontodes on the interopercular bone, and is the root name of many genera in the subfamily Hypostominae. The specific name, eschwartzae, honours Eugenia Schwartz, an artist and benefactor of the Coypu Foundation, who generosity enabled the authors' work.

== Description ==
Andeancistrus eschwartzae has eight soft rays in its dorsal fin and three or four in its anal fin. This species can be told apart from its only congener, A. platycephalus, by having a black to dark grey ground colour on the head and body, as opposed to pale grey. It also has irregularly shaped round to elongated yellow-gold marking less than half the diameter of the nostril which are evenly distributed across the head, sides and back and on the fin rays while A. platycephalus possesses white or blue regular spots. A. eschwartzae also lacks clusters of odontodes forming keels on most of the plates on the lateral line. The maximum standard length is 14.4 cm (5.7 in).

== Distribution ==
Andeancistrus eschwartzae is endemic to Ecuador where it is found in the Pastaza River basin.
