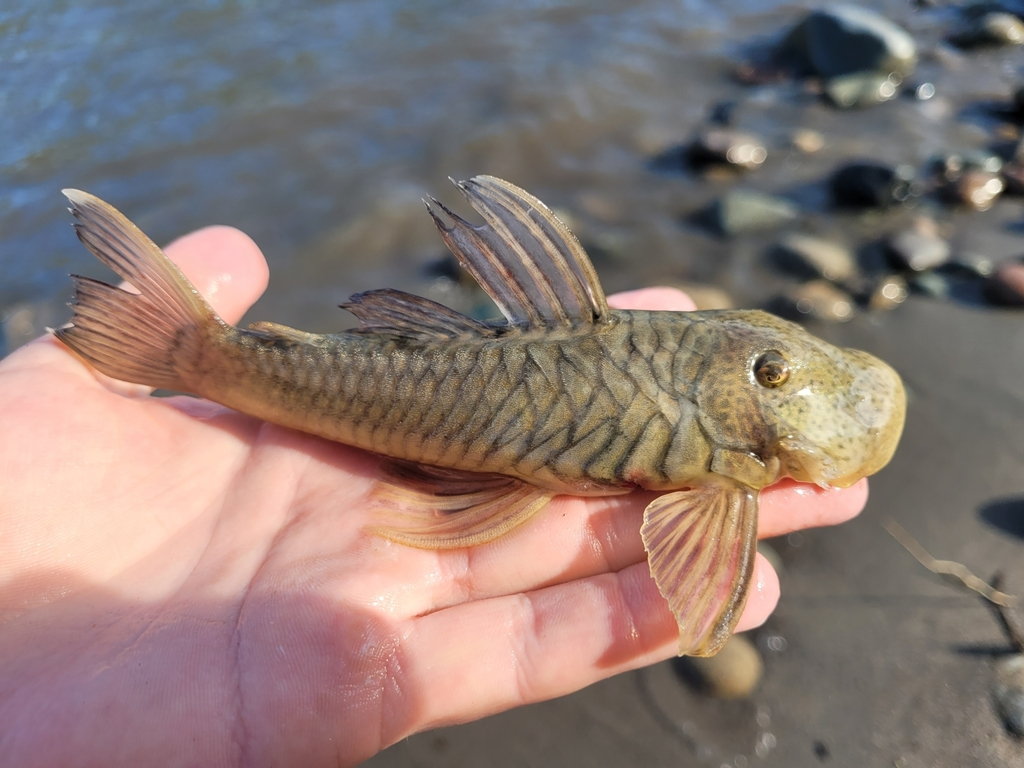

Conservation status
- Data Deficient (IUCN 3.1)

Scientific classification
- Kingdom: Animalia
- Phylum: Chordata
- Class: Actinopterygii
- Order: Siluriformes
- Family: Loricariidae
- Genus: Chaetostoma
- Species: C. dermorhynchus

Binomial name
- Chaetostoma dermorhynchus Boulenger, 1887

Synonyms
- Chaetostomus dermorhynchum Boulenger,1887

= Chaetostoma dermorhynchus =

Species of catfish

Chaetostoma dermorhynchus is a species of freshwater ray-finned fish belonging to the family Loricariidae, the suckermouth armoured catfishes, and the subfamily Hypostominae, the suckermouth catfishes. This catfish is endemic to Ecuador where it occurs in the basins of the Pastaza River, the Bobonaza River, the Napo River and the Curaray River. The species reaches a total length of 25 cm (9.8 in) in total length. As there is vert little information about this catfuish's dustribution, population size and the threats it may face, the International Union for Conservation of Nature has assessed its status as Data Deficient.
