= Chaetostoma spondylus =

Scientific classification
- Kingdom: Animalia
- Phylum: Chordata
- Class: Actinopterygii
- Order: Siluriformes
- Family: Loricariidae
- Genus: Chaetostoma
- Species: C. spondylus

Binomial name
- Chaetostoma spondylus Salcedo & Ortega, 2015

Species of fish

Chaetostoma spondylus is a species of freshwater ray-finned fish belonging to the family Loricariidae, the suckermouth armoured catfishes, and the subfamily Hypostominae, the suckermouth catfishes. This catfish is endemic to Peru where it is found in mountain tributaries of the Maranon River at altitudes bteween 1,500 and 2,000 m (4,900 and 6,600 ft), preferring steep streams and rapids with a bed of boulders. This species reaches a standard length of 13.1 cm (5.2 in). C. spondylus is thought to prefer temperatures of 23 to 27 °C (73 to 81 °F).
