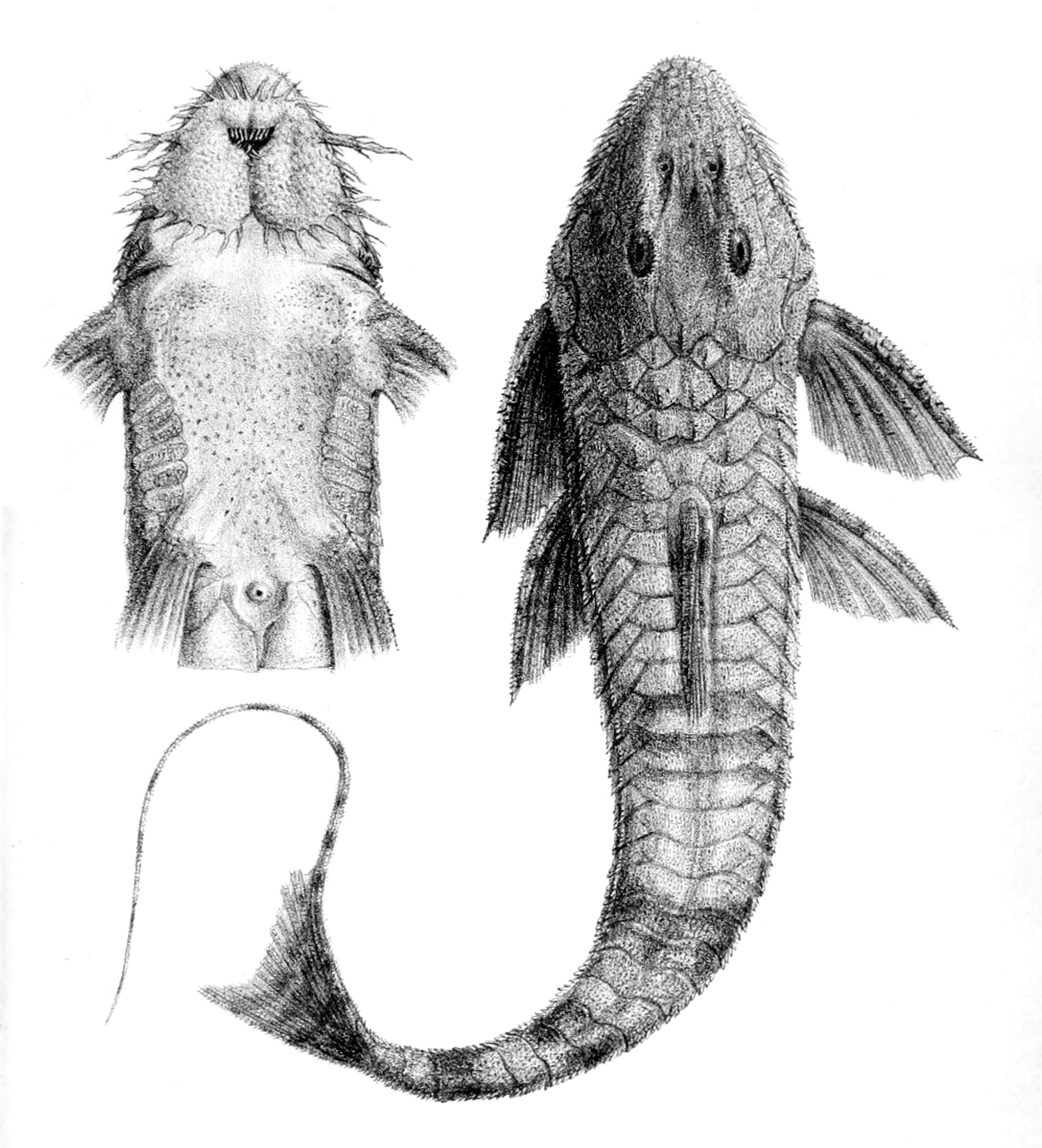

Conservation status
- Least Concern (IUCN 3.1)

Scientific classification
- Kingdom: Animalia
- Phylum: Chordata
- Class: Actinopterygii
- Order: Siluriformes
- Family: Loricariidae
- Genus: Spatuloricaria
- Species: S. evansii

Binomial name
- Spatuloricaria evansii (Boulenger, 1892)

Synonyms
- Loricaria evansii Boulenger, 1892; Loricaria cirrhosa Perugia, 1897

= Spatuloricaria evansii =

Species of catfish

Spatuloricaria evansii is a species of freshwater ray-finned fish belonging to the family Loricariidae, the suckermouth armored catfishes, and the subfamily Loricariinae, the mailed catfishes. This catfish occurs in the upper Paraguay, middle and lower Paraná, and Amazon river basins, being found in Argentina, Bolivia, Brazil, Paraguay, and Peru. This species reaches a standard length of 28.2 cm (11.1 in)and can weigh up to at least 126 g (4.4 oz). The specific name honors the British geologist John William Evans who collected the holotype on an expedition to Matto Grosso.
