= Chaetostoma dorsale =

Conservation status
- Vulnerable (IUCN 3.1)

Scientific classification
- Kingdom: Animalia
- Phylum: Chordata
- Class: Actinopterygii
- Order: Siluriformes
- Family: Loricariidae
- Genus: Chaetostoma
- Species: C. dorsale

Binomial name
- Chaetostoma dorsale C. H. Eigenmann, 1922

Synonyms
- Chaetostomus dorsalis C. H. Eigenmann, 1922

Species of catfish

Chaetostoma dorsale is a species of freshwater ray-finned fish belonging to the family Loricariidae, the suckermouth armoured catfishes, and the subfamily Hypostominae, the suckermouth catfishes. This catfish is found in northern South America where it occurs in the basins of the Meta River, the Guaviare River and the Apure River in Colombia and Venezuela. This species reaches a standard length of 8.8 cm (3.5 in). The International Union for Conservation of Nature has assessed the conservation status of C. dorsale as Vulnerable because it has a restricted range and its habitat is threatened by agricultural and urban expansion.
