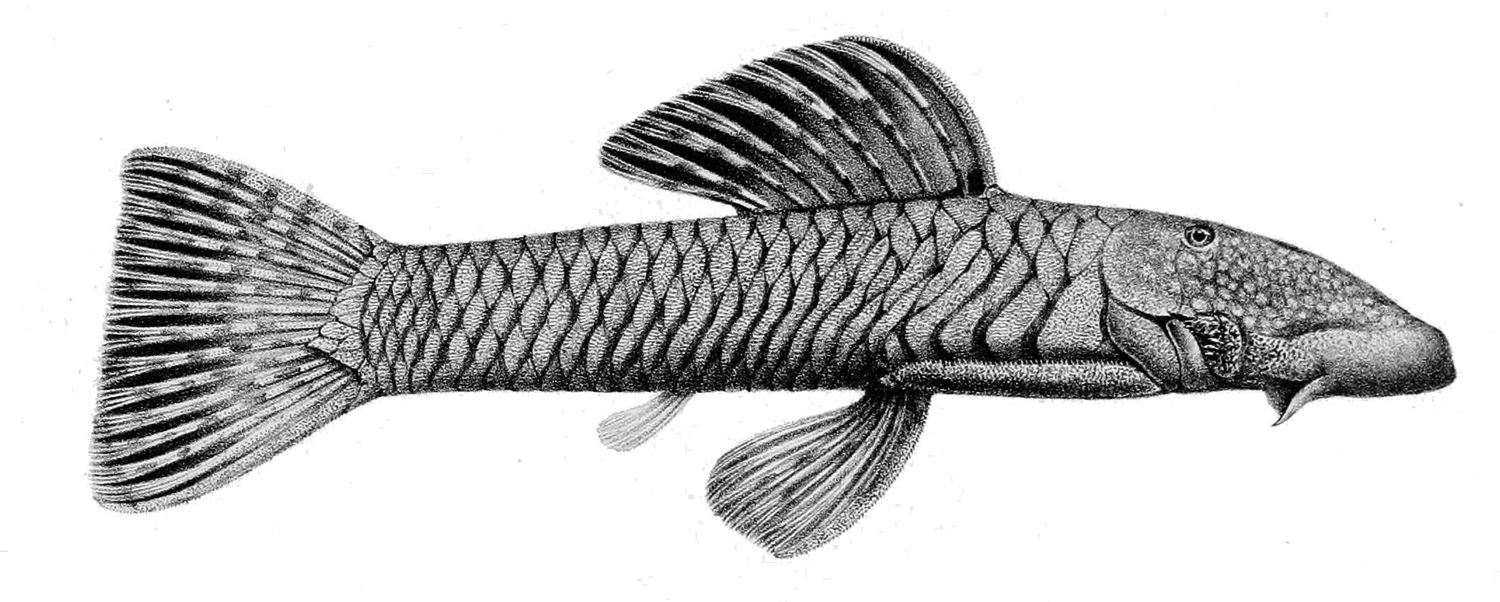

Conservation status
- Least Concern (IUCN 3.1)

Scientific classification
- Kingdom: Animalia
- Phylum: Chordata
- Class: Actinopterygii
- Order: Siluriformes
- Family: Loricariidae
- Genus: Chaetostoma
- Species: C. anomalum

Binomial name
- Chaetostoma anomalum Regan, 1903

Synonyms
- Chaetostomus anomalus Regan, 1903

= Chaetostoma anomalum =

Species of catfish

Chaetostoma anomalum is a species of freshwater ray-finned fish belonging to the family Loricariidae, the suckermouth armoured catfishes, and the subfamily Hypostominae, the suckermouth catfishes. This catfish is found in Colombia and Venezuela in cool, shallow, fast flowing streams and rivers in the basin of Lake Maracaibo. This species reaches a standard length of 16.5 cm (6.5 in).
