= Chaetostoma lexa =

Scientific classification
- Kingdom: Animalia
- Phylum: Chordata
- Class: Actinopterygii
- Order: Siluriformes
- Family: Loricariidae
- Genus: Chaetostoma
- Species: C. lexa

Binomial name
- Chaetostoma lexa (Salcedo, 2013)

Synonyms
- Loraxichthys lexa Salcedo, 2013

Species of fish

Chaetostoma lexa is a species of freshwater ray-finned fish belonging to the family Loricariidae, the suckermouth armoured catfishes, and the subfamily Hypostominae, the suckermouth catfishes. This catfish is endemic to Peru where it occurs in the Huallaga River in the Department of Huánuco. This species reaches a standard length of 4.9 cm (1.9 in). C. lexa was first formally described as Loraxichthys lexa in 2013 by Norma Juliana Salcedo-Maúrtua with its type locality given as Mariano Dámaso Beraun, vicinity of Tingo María, Cueva de las Pavas, Quebrada Luconyupe, at 9°22'15.1"S, 75°58'32.7"W, in Leoncio Prado, Huánuco. When Salcedo-Maúrtua described this species she classified it in the new monospecific genus Loraxichthys, this is now regarded as a synonym of Chaetostoma.
