= Chaetostoma venezuelae =

Conservation status
- Data Deficient (IUCN 3.1)

Scientific classification
- Kingdom: Animalia
- Phylum: Chordata
- Class: Actinopterygii
- Division: Teleostei
- Order: Siluriformes
- Family: Loricariidae
- Genus: Chaetostoma
- Species: C. venezuelae

Binomial name
- Chaetostoma venezuelae (Schultz, 1944)

Synonyms
- Corymbophanes venezuelae Schultz, 1944

Species of fish

Chaetostoma venezuelae is a species of freshwater ray-finned fish belonging to the family Loricariidae, the suckermouth armoured catfishes, and the subfamily Hypostominae, the suckermouth catfishes. This catfish is endemic to Venezuela, where it occurs in the Tuy River basin and in the east of the country. This species reaches a standard length of 7.3 cm (2.9 in). The International Union for Conservation of Nature have assessed this species as Data Deficient because there is very little data on its actual distribution or biology, and it has not been registered in sampling since 1977.
