= Chaetostoma lepturum =

Conservation status
- Endangered (IUCN 3.1)

Scientific classification
- Kingdom: Animalia
- Phylum: Chordata
- Class: Actinopterygii
- Order: Siluriformes
- Family: Loricariidae
- Genus: Chaetostoma
- Species: C. lepturum

Binomial name
- Chaetostoma lepturum Regan, 1912

Synonyms
- Chaetostomus lepturus Regan, 1912

Species of catfish

Chaetostoma lepturum is a species of freshwater ray-finned fish belonging to the family Loricariidae, the suckermouth armoured catfishes, and the subfamily Hypostominae, the suckermouth catfishes. This catfish is endemic to Colombia where it is known only to occur in the Tamaná River, Upper San Juan River basin in Chocó. This species reaches a standard length of 21.5 cm (8.5 in). The International Union for Conservation of Nature assess this species as Endangered because its habitat is threatened by pollution caused by mining and forest clearnace for cattle ranching.
