= Chaetostoma nudirostre =

Scientific classification
- Kingdom: Animalia
- Phylum: Chordata
- Class: Actinopterygii
- Order: Siluriformes
- Family: Loricariidae
- Genus: Chaetostoma
- Species: C. nudirostre

Binomial name
- Chaetostoma nudirostre Lütken, 1874

Synonyms
- Chaetostomus nudirostris Lütken, 1874

Species of catfish

Chaetostoma nudirostre is a species of freshwater ray-finned fish belonging to the family Loricariidae, the suckermouth armoured catfishes, and the subfamily Hypostominae, the suckermouth catfishes. This catfish is endemic to Venezuela where it occurs in the Lake Valencia drainage system. This species reaches a standard length of 12.6 cm (5.0 in).
