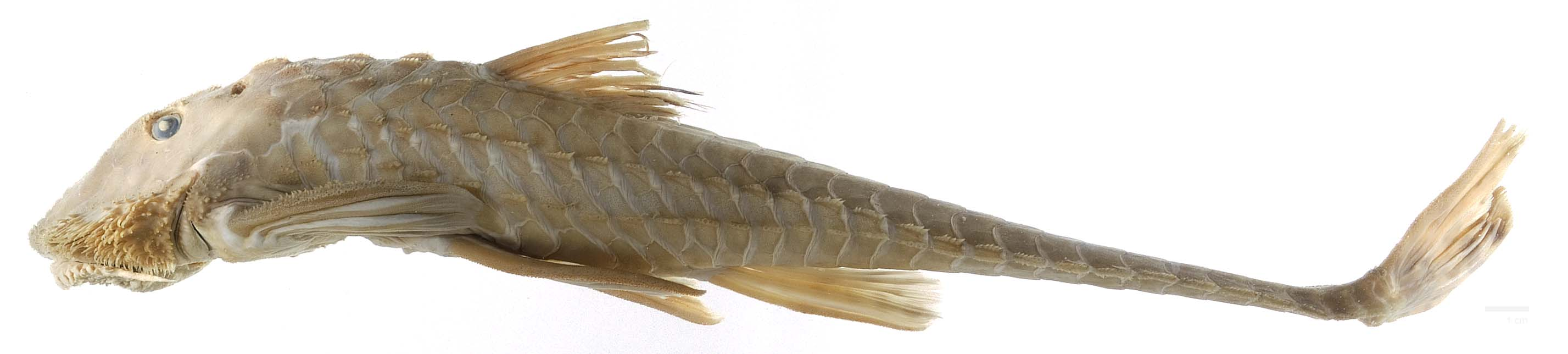

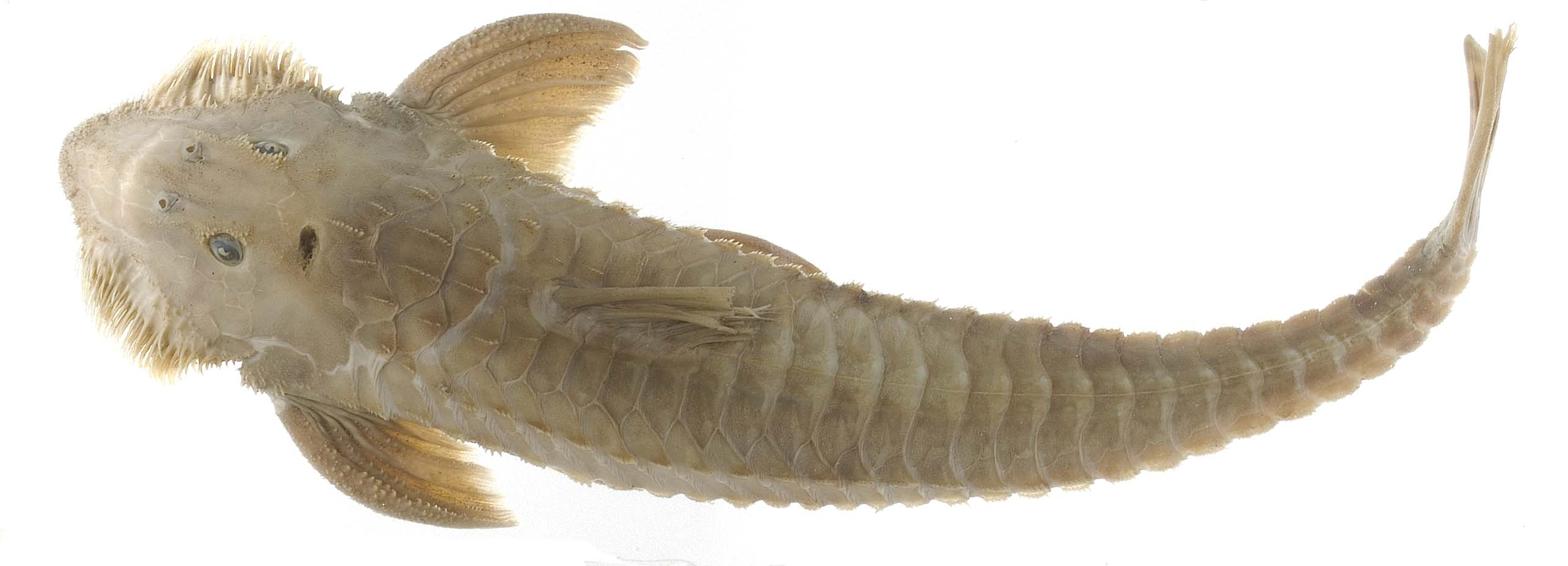

Conservation status
- Data Deficient (IUCN 3.1)

Scientific classification
- Kingdom: Animalia
- Phylum: Chordata
- Class: Actinopterygii
- Order: Siluriformes
- Family: Loricariidae
- Genus: Spatuloricaria
- Species: S. atratoensis

Binomial name
- Spatuloricaria atratoensis Schultz, 1944

= Spatuloricaria atratoensis =

Species of catfish

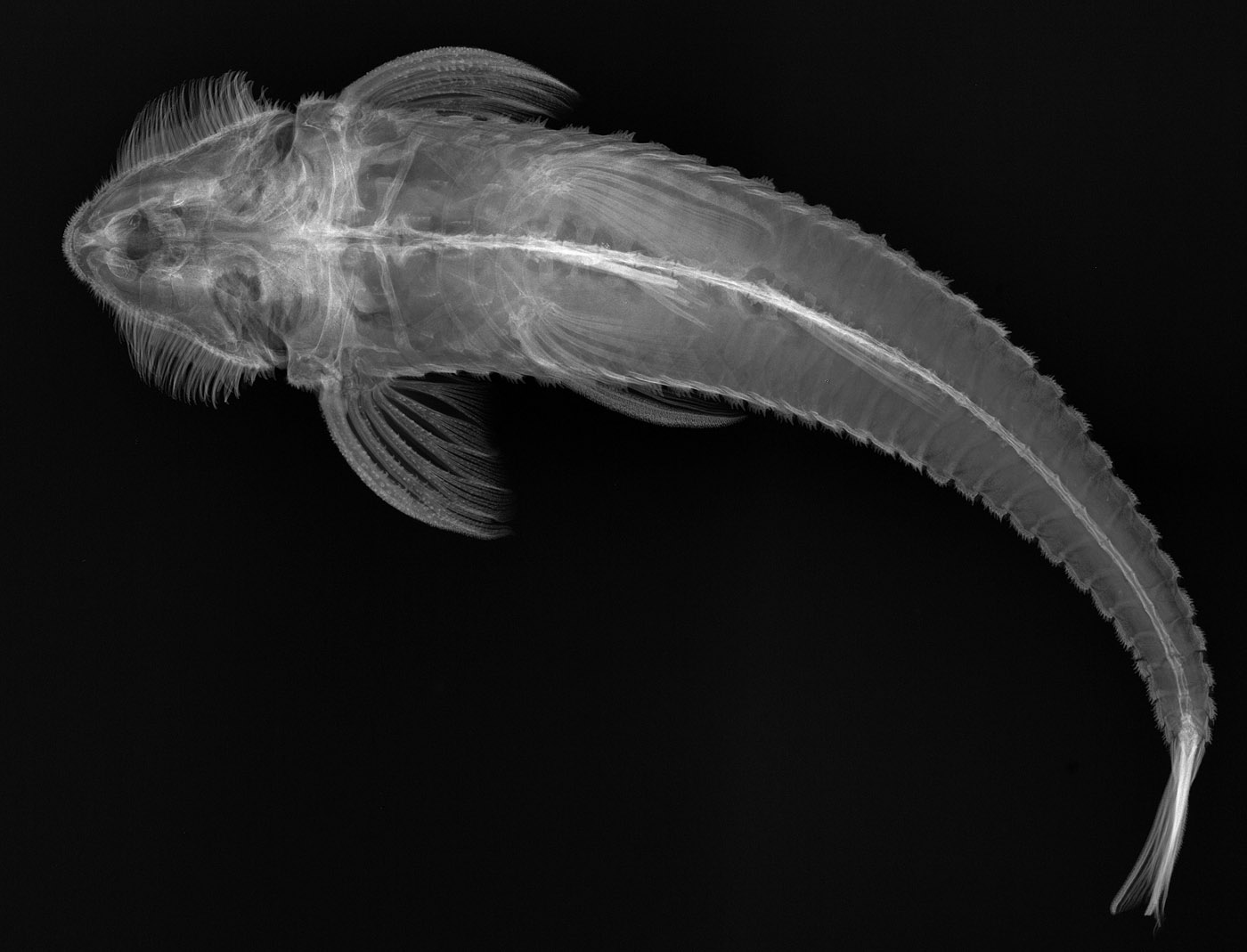
An X-ray of a specimen of Spatuloricaria atratoensis.

Spatuloricaria atratoensis is a species of freshwater ray-finned fish belonging to the family Loricariidae, the suckermouth armored catfishes, and the subfamily Loricariinae, the mailed catfishes. This catfish occurs only in the Río Truandó, a tributary of the Atrato River in Colombia. This species reaches a standard length of 34 cm (13 in).
