= Chaetostoma trimaculineum =

Scientific classification
- Kingdom: Animalia
- Phylum: Chordata
- Class: Actinopterygii
- Order: Siluriformes
- Family: Loricariidae
- Genus: Chaetostoma
- Species: C. trimaculineum

Binomial name
- Chaetostoma trimaculineum Lujan, Meza-Vargas, V., Astudillo-Clavijo, Barriga S. & López-Fernández, 2015

Species of fish

Chaetostoma trimaculineum is a species of freshwater ray-finned fish belonging to the family Loricariidae, the suckermouth armoured catfishes, and the subfamily Hypostominae, the suckermouth catfishes. This catfish is found in the upper Santiago and middle Marañon river drainages in eastern Ecuador and northern Peru. This species reaches a standard length of 16 cm (6.3 in). Itcan be told apart from other Chaetostoma species by having three or four linear rows of distinct, round, nostril-sized black spots along the median, mid-dorsal, and dorsal plates of the body, three smaller white spots on the head and it has four branched rays in its anal fin. This species was first formally described in 2015 by Nathan K. Lujan, Vanessa Meza-Vargas, Viviana Astudillo-Clavijo, Ramiro Edmundo Barriga-Salazar & Hernán López-Fernández with its type locality given as the Santiago River drainage, Morona-Santiago Province, confluence of the Changachangasa and Tutanangosa rivers and upstream in both, at 2°35'51.18"S, 78°11'10.38"W in Ecuador.
