= Chaetostoma dupouii =

Conservation status
- Vulnerable (IUCN 3.1)

Scientific classification
- Kingdom: Animalia
- Phylum: Chordata
- Class: Actinopterygii
- Order: Siluriformes
- Family: Loricariidae
- Genus: Chaetostoma
- Species: C. dupouii

Binomial name
- Chaetostoma dupouii Fernández-Yépez, 1945

Species of catfish

Chaetostoma dupouii is a species of freshwater ray-finned fish belonging to the family Loricariidae, the suckermouth armoured catfishes, and the subfamily Hypostominae, the suckermouth catfishes. This catfish is endemic to Venezuela where it is known from three locations on the drainages basins of Lake Valencia and the Tuy River. This species reaches a standard length of 7.9 cm (3.1 in). It was described in 1945 by Agustín Fernández-Yépez, a Venezuelan ichthyologist, with its type locality given as the Río Encantado about 1 km (0.62 mi) from junction of Río Encantado and Río Grande. The specific name, dupouii, honours the Venezuelan anthropologist, biologist and director of the National Museum of Natural Sciences (Caracas), Walter Dupouy, who encouraged and supported Fernández-Yépez's work on catfishes.

The International Union for Conservation of Nature has assessed the conservation status of C. dupouii as Vulnerable because it has a restricted range and its habitat is threatened by logging and urbanisation.

Chaetostoma dupouii occasionally appears in the aquarium trade, where it is sometimes referred to as Dupou's rubbernose.
