= Spatuloricaria phelpsi =

Conservation status
- Least Concern (IUCN 3.1)

Scientific classification
- Kingdom: Animalia
- Phylum: Chordata
- Class: Actinopterygii
- Division: Teleostei
- Order: Siluriformes
- Family: Loricariidae
- Genus: Spatuloricaria
- Species: S. phelpsi

Binomial name
- Spatuloricaria phelpsi Schultz, 1944

Species of catfish

Spatuloricaria phelpsi is a species of is a species of freshwater ray-finned fish belonging to the family Loricariidae, the suckermouth armored catfishes, and the subfamily Loricariinae, the mailed catfishes. This catfish occurs in the Lake Maracaibo basin in Colombia and Venezuela, with its type locality reportedly being the Socuy River. This species reaches a standard length of 33.3 cm (13.1 in)and is known to feed on algae and detritus. This species is the type species of the genus Spatuloricaria by monotypy, being the only species in the genus when Leonard Peter Schultz proposed it. The specific name honors the Venezuelan ornithologist and businessman William H. Phelps Jr. who was president of the Sociedad Venezolana de Ciencias Naturales of Caracas for the help he gave to Schultz and his importance to the buological sciences in Venezuela.
