= Chaetostoma floridablancaense =

Scientific classification
- Kingdom: Animalia
- Phylum: Chordata
- Class: Actinopterygii
- Order: Siluriformes
- Family: Loricariidae
- Genus: Chaetostoma
- Species: C. floridablancaense

Binomial name
- Chaetostoma floridablancaense Ardila Rodríguez, 2013

Synonyms
- Chaetostoma floridablancaensis Ardila Rodríguez, 2013

Species of catfish

Chaetostoma floridablancaense is a species of freshwater ray-finned fish belonging to the family Loricariidae, the suckermouth armoured catfishes, and the subfamily Hypostominae, the suckermouth catfishes. This catfish is endemic to Colombia where it is found in tributaries to the Rio Oro in Floridablanca and Girón in the Department of Santander. This species reaches a standard length of 10.1 cm (4.0 in). The specific name, means "of Floridablanca", referring to the location of the type locality in the municipality of Floridablanca, it also reflects the love that the species describer, Carlos A. Ardila Rodríguez, has for his home region.
