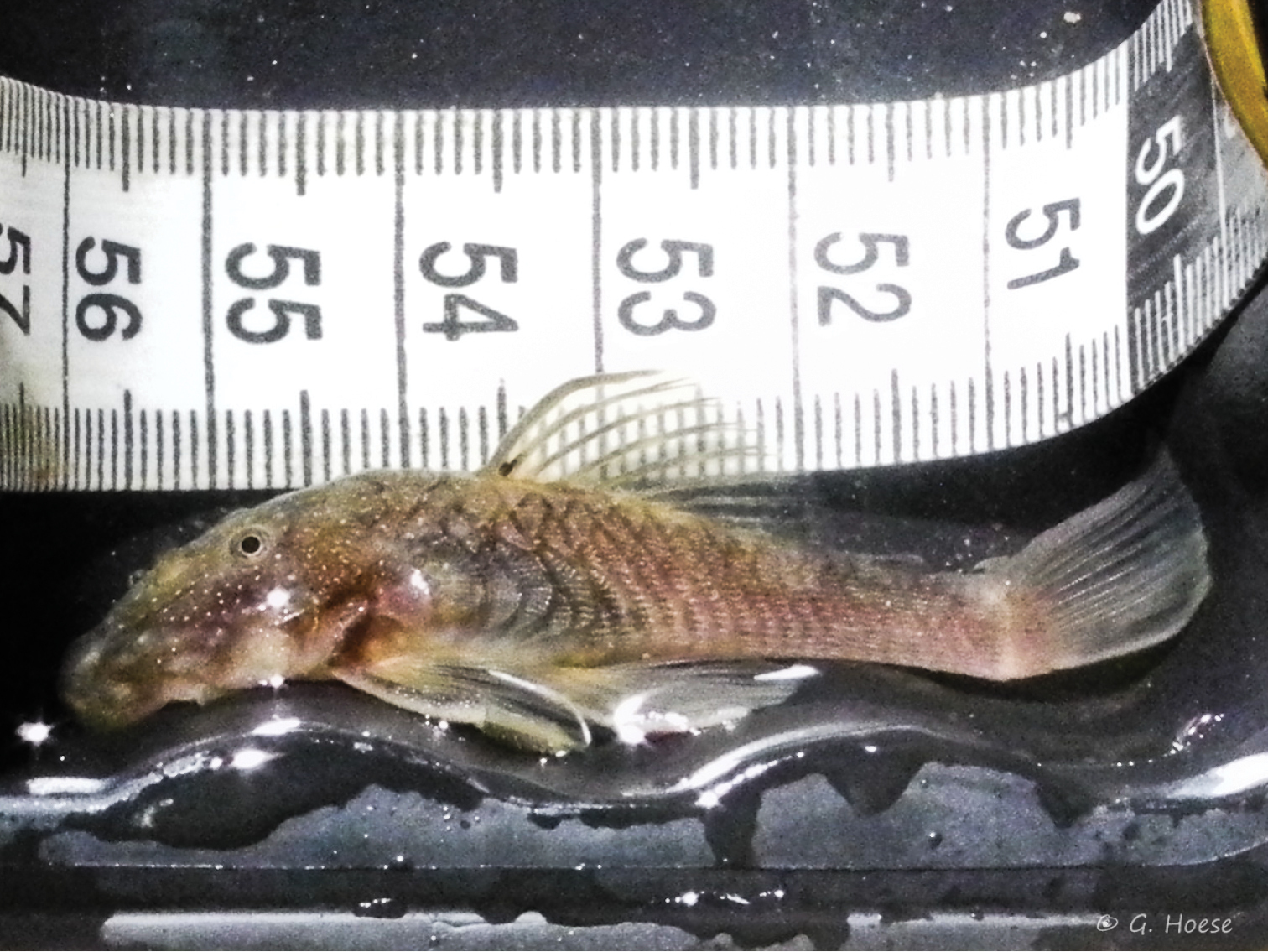

Conservation status
- Least Concern (IUCN 3.1)

Scientific classification
- Kingdom: Animalia
- Phylum: Chordata
- Class: Actinopterygii
- Order: Siluriformes
- Family: Loricariidae
- Genus: Chaetostoma
- Species: C. microps

Binomial name
- Chaetostoma microps Günther, 1864

Synonyms
- Chaetostomus mollinasus Pearson, 1937; Chaetostoma mollinasum Pearson, 1937

= Chaetostoma microps =

Species of fish

Chaetostoma microps is a species of freshwater ray-finned fish belonging to the family Loricariidae, the suckermouth armoured catfishes, and the subfamily Hypostominae, the suckermouth catfishes. This catfish is found in Ecuador and Peru. The fish has been filmed climbing cave walls,

== Taxonomy ==
Chaetostoma microps was first formally described in 1864 by the German-born British herpetologist and ichthyologist Albert Günther with its type locality given as the Andes of western Ecuador. Eschmeyer's Catalog of Fishes classifies the genus Ancistrus in the subfamily Hypostominae, the suckermouth catfishes, within the suckermouth armored catfish family Loricariidae. It has also been classified in the tribe Ancistrini by some authorities.

== Description ==
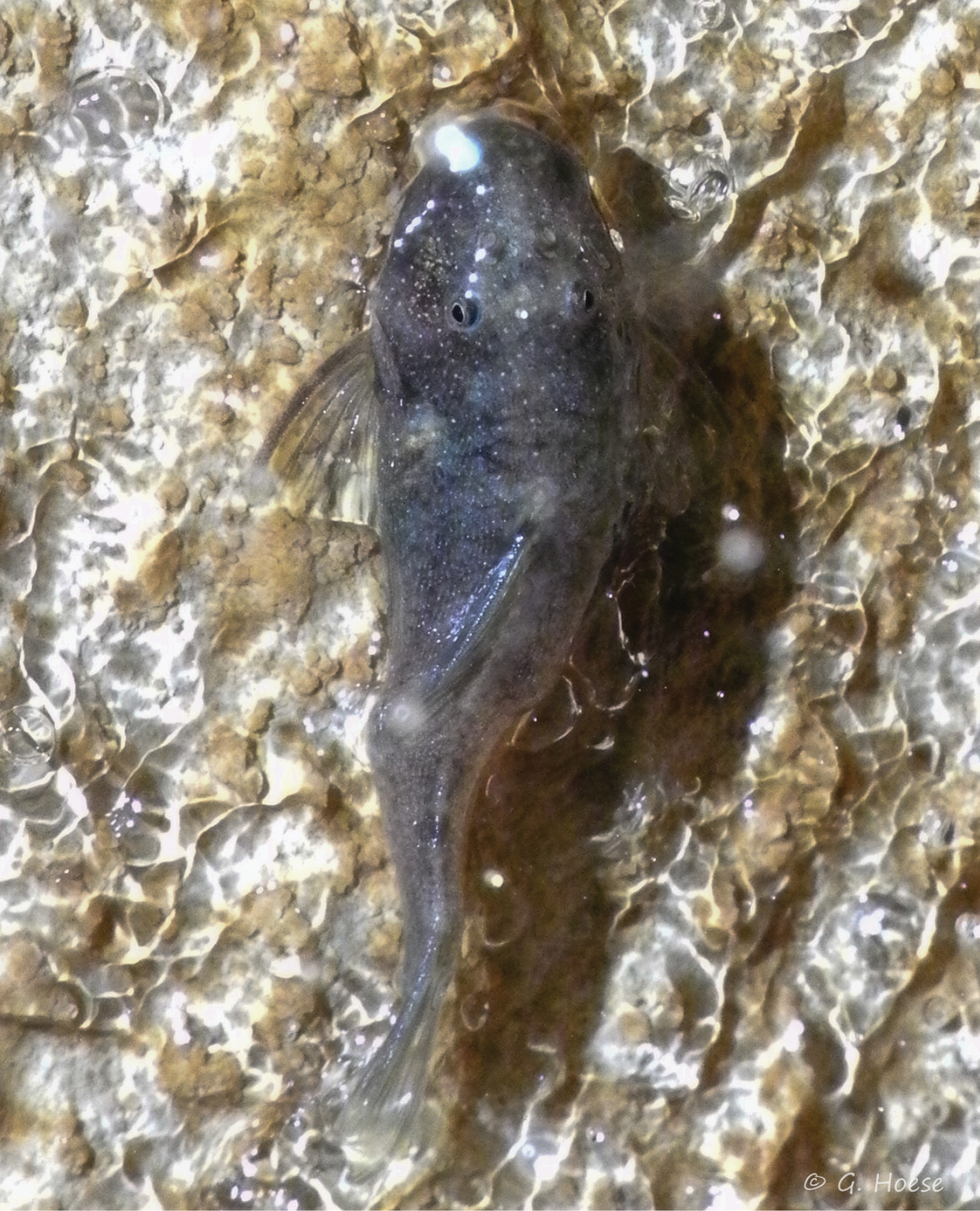
C. microps on flowstone wall in sheet flow. The fish is facing up on a 75° slope

C. microps has the following characteristics :

- absence of plates (external flattened armoured structures) on the ventral region
- absence of plates on the edge of the catfish snout
- presence of interopercular odontodes (barbs behind the gill covers), a characteristic shared with another species - C. platyrhynchus
- absence of fleshy tentacles on the snout, differentiating this genus from Ancistrus spp.

C. microps has a few sexually dimorphic characteristics, namely the head of females is smaller and narrower than that of males, while broader ventrally; in addition, the pelvic fins of the male are much larger, evidently so that, when inverted over a cluster of fish-eggs, they can protect sperm from being carried away in the current and thus aid fertilisation. The fish is 8.9 centimetres (3.5 in) long.

== Natural history ==
C. microps, which has previously been recorded in rivers originating from the Andes mountains, clings to rocks. The fish are primarily algae-feeders.

Recently, the fish was recorded underground from limestone caves containing streams, near Tena, Napo Province, Ecuador. The fish was observed and filmed climbing the cave wall reaching up to 10 feet (3.0 m) above the water level.

Climbing fish are known in epigean astroblepids and loricariids. A fish that climbs waterfalls and rapids, Cryptotora thamicola, has been recorded from Thailand.

C. microps is unique in that this fish can "shimmy up cave walls where water streamed down from tiny underground tributaries". The fish is able to crawl up walls, having an angle of up to 75°, where a thin film of flowing water occurs, with the help of morphological modifications to the mouth, fins and skin. It has been surmised that this species has begun evolving for a life underground.
