= Chaetostoma chimu =

Scientific classification
- Kingdom: Animalia
- Phylum: Chordata
- Class: Actinopterygii
- Order: Siluriformes
- Family: Loricariidae
- Genus: Chaetostoma
- Species: C. chimu

Binomial name
- Chaetostoma chimu Urbano-Bonilla & Ballen, 2020

Species of catfish

Chaetostoma chimu is a species of freshwater ray-finned fish belonging to the family Loricariidae, the suckermouth armoured catfishes, and the subfamily Hypostominae, the suckermouth catfishes. This catfish is endemic to Colombia wg=here it occurs in the upper basins of the Meta and Guaviare Rivers in the Andean foothills of the Orinoco basin. Thos species reaches a standard length of 14.8 cm (5.8 in).
