= Spatuloricaria lagoichthys =

Conservation status
- Least Concern (IUCN 3.1)

Scientific classification
- Kingdom: Animalia
- Phylum: Chordata
- Class: Actinopterygii
- Order: Siluriformes
- Family: Loricariidae
- Genus: Spatuloricaria
- Species: S. lagoichthys

Binomial name
- Spatuloricaria lagoichthys (Schultz, 1944)

Synonyms
- Loricaria gymnogaster lagoichthys Schultz, 1944

Species of catfish

Spatuloricaria lagoichthys is a species of is a species of freshwater ray-finned fish belonging to the family Loricariidae, the suckermouth armored catfishes, and the subfamily Loricariinae, the mailed catfishes. This catfish occurs in the Lake Maracaibo basin in Venezuela. The species reaches a standard length of 30.6 cm (12.0 in).
