= Chaetostoma tachiraense =

Conservation status
- Vulnerable (IUCN 3.1)

Scientific classification
- Kingdom: Animalia
- Phylum: Chordata
- Class: Actinopterygii
- Order: Siluriformes
- Family: Loricariidae
- Genus: Chaetostoma
- Species: C. tachiraense

Binomial name
- Chaetostoma tachiraense Schultz, 1944

Synonyms
- Chaetostoma tachiraensis Schultz, 1944

Species of catfish

Chaetostoma tachiraense is a species of freshwater ray-finned fish belonging to the family Loricariidae, the suckermouth armoured catfishes, and the subfamily Hypostominae, the suckermouth catfishes. This catfish is found in northern South America where it occurs in the southern rivers of the Maracaibo Basin, in the rivers draining the Cordillera de Mérida and the Sierra de Perija in Colombia and Venezuela. This species reaches a standard length of 8.7 cm (3.4 in). The International Union for Conservation of Nature has classified this species as Vulnerable because it has a restricted range which is undergoing habitat degradation.
