= Spatuloricaria puganensis =

Conservation status
- Least Concern (IUCN 3.1)

Scientific classification
- Kingdom: Animalia
- Phylum: Chordata
- Class: Actinopterygii
- Order: Siluriformes
- Family: Loricariidae
- Genus: Spatuloricaria
- Species: S. puganensis

Binomial name
- Spatuloricaria puganensis (Pearson, 1937)

Synonyms
- Loricaria puganensis Pearson, 1937

Species of catfish

Spatuloricaria puganensis, sometimes known as the longtail pleco, is a species of freshwater ray-finned fish belonging to the family Loricariidae, the suckermouth armored catfishes, and the subfamily Loricariinae, the mailed catfishes. This catfish occurs in the Amazon River basin in Peru. This species reaches 22 cm (8.7 in) in length.
