= Spatuloricaria euacanthagenys =

Conservation status
- Data Deficient (IUCN 3.1)

Scientific classification
- Kingdom: Animalia
- Phylum: Chordata
- Class: Actinopterygii
- Order: Siluriformes
- Family: Loricariidae
- Genus: Spatuloricaria
- Species: S. euacanthagenys

Binomial name
- Spatuloricaria euacanthagenys Isbrücker, 1979

Synonyms
- Euacanthagenys caquetae Fowler, 1945

Species of catfish

Spatuloricaria euacanthagenys, sometimes known as the longtail pleco, s a species of freshwater ray-finned fish belonging to the family Loricariidae, the suckermouth armored catfishes, and the subfamily Loricariinae, the mailed catfishes. This catfish occurs in the Caqueta River basin in Colombia. The species reaches 52 cm (20 in) in length.
