= Chaetostoma stroumpoulos =

Conservation status
- Endangered (IUCN 3.1)

Scientific classification
- Kingdom: Animalia
- Phylum: Chordata
- Class: Actinopterygii
- Division: Teleostei
- Order: Siluriformes
- Family: Loricariidae
- Genus: Chaetostoma
- Species: C. stroumpoulos

Binomial name
- Chaetostoma stroumpoulos Salcedo, 2006

Species of catfish

Chaetostoma stroumpoulos is a species of freshwater ray-finned fish belonging to the family Loricariidae, the suckermouth armoured catfishes, and the subfamily Hypostominae, the suckermouth catfishes. This species is endemic to Peru and is known only from its type locality of the Huallaga River in the vicinity of Tingo María. The species was described alongside the species Chaetostoma daidalmatos in 2006 by Norma J. Salcedo on the basis of distinctive morphology and coloration. This species reaches a standard length of 120 mm (4.7 in). The International Union for Conservation of Nature have assessed that this species is Endangered because it has a restricted range and its habitats are threatened by deforestation, agriculture and poluution, including pollution from mining and the spraying by herbicides on illegal coca plantations by the authorities.
