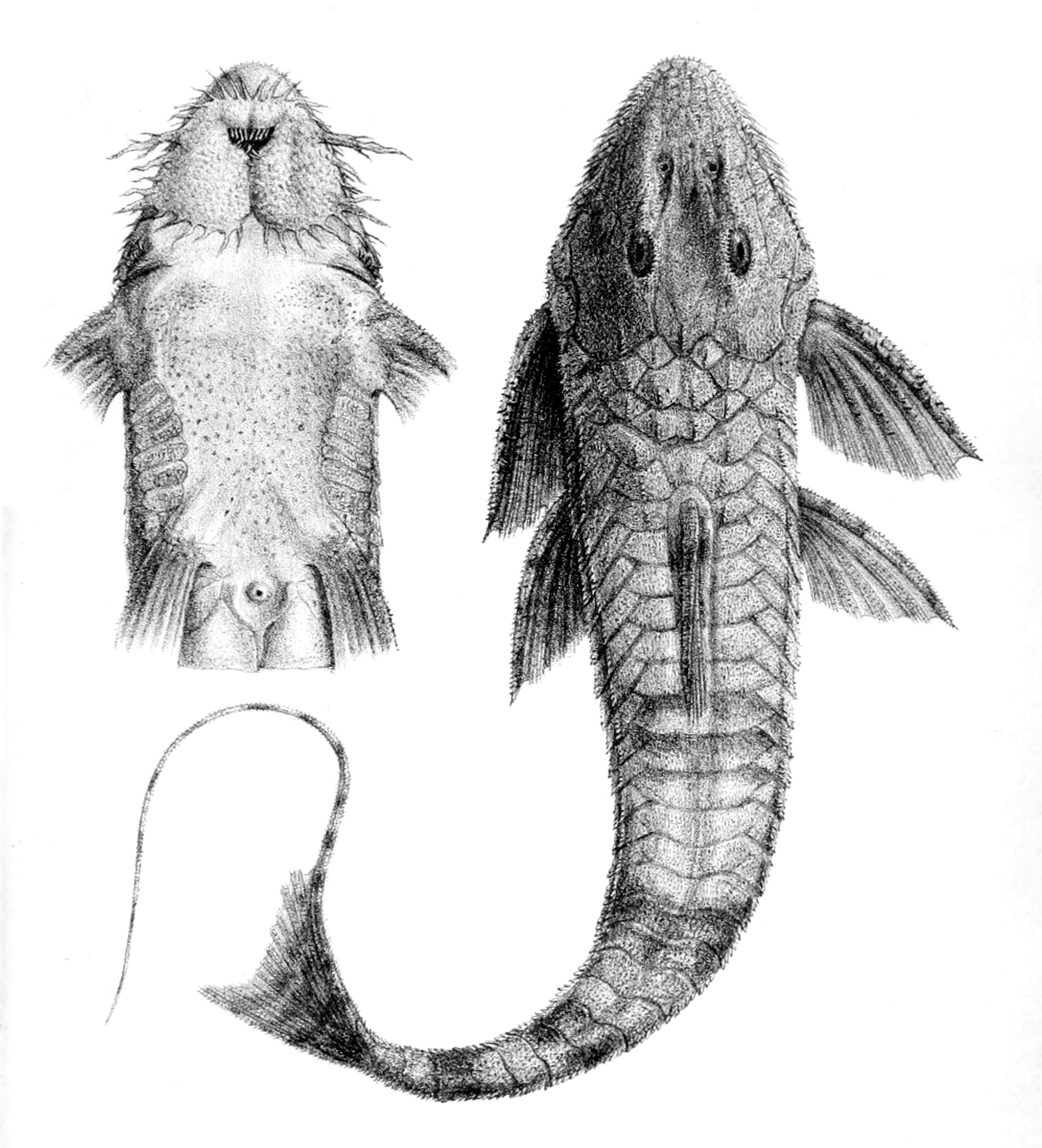
- Spatuloricaria evansii

Scientific classification
- Kingdom: Animalia
- Phylum: Chordata
- Class: Actinopterygii
- Order: Siluriformes
- Family: Loricariidae
- Subfamily: Loricariinae
- Genus: Spatuloricaria; L. P. Schultz, 1944

Type species
- Spatuloricaria phelpsi L. P. Schultz, 1944

Synonyms
- Euacanthagenys Fowler, 1945

= Spatuloricaria =

Genus of fishes

Spatuloricaria is a genus of freshwater ray-finned fishes belonging to the family Loricariidae, the suckermouth armored catfishes, and the subfamily Loricariinae, the mailed catfishes. The catfishes in this genus are found in South America and southern Central America.

Spatuloricaria is in need of revision, as species boundaries and distributions are poorly known. The phylogenetic position of Spatuloricaria remains uncertain. Spatuloricaria has been placed at the base of a clade including representatives of the Loricaria and Pseudohemiodon groups. Its dentition, with few teeth on the premaxillae, and its abdominal cover consisting of minute disjointed platelets resembles that of some representatives of the Loricaria group. Conversely, the papillose surface of the lips and sexually dimorphic features are more characteristic of the Rineloricaria group.

This genus is distributed in the northwestern part of the South American subcontinent, in drainages of the Pacific and Atlantic Slopes of the Andes. Several species occur also in the upper Amazon River basin, upper Paraguay, and São Francisco River basins.

Sexual dimorphism includes hypertrophied development of claw-like odontodes along the sides of the head and on the pectoral spines in mature males. Ecological data is unavailable and reproductive biology is unknown for Spatuloricaria species.

== Species ==
Spatuloricaria contains the following species:

- Spatuloricaria atratoensis Schultz, 1944
- Spatuloricaria caquetae (Fowler, 1943)
- Spatuloricaria curvispina (Dahl, 1941)
- Spatuloricaria euacanthagenys Isbrücker, 1979
- Spatuloricaria evansii (Boulenger, 1892)
- Spatuloricaria fimbriata (C. H. Eigenmann & Vance, 1912)
- Spatuloricaria gymnogaster (C. H. Eigenmann & Vance, 1912)
- Spatuloricaria lagoichthys (Schultz, 1944)
- Spatuloricaria nudiventris (Valenciennes, 1840)
- Spatuloricaria phelpsi Schultz, 1944
- Spatuloricaria puganensis (Pearson, 1937)
- Spatuloricaria terracanticum Londoño-Burbano, Urbano-Bonilla, Rojas-Molina, Ramírez-Gil & Prada-Pedreros, 2018
- Spatuloricaria tuira Fichberg, O. T. Oyakawa & de Pinna, 2014
