= Chaetostoma yurubiense =

Conservation status
- Endangered (IUCN 3.1)

Scientific classification
- Kingdom: Animalia
- Phylum: Chordata
- Class: Actinopterygii
- Order: Siluriformes
- Family: Loricariidae
- Genus: Chaetostoma
- Species: C. yurubiense

Binomial name
- Chaetostoma yurubiense Ceas & Page, 1996

Species of fish

Chaetostoma yurubiense is a species of freshwater ray-finned fish belonging to the family Loricariidae, the suckermouth armoured catfishes, and the subfamily Hypostominae, the suckermouth catfishes. This catfish is endemic to Venezuela where it occurs in the rivers Yaracuy, Aroa, Urama, Capa, Guarataro and Cupa which flow from the foothills of the Andes to the Caribbean Sea. This species reaches a standard length of 17 cm (6.7 in). The International Union for Conservation of Nature have assessed C. yurubiense as Endangered because it is known from very few locations and these are threatened by damming, agricultural pollution and urbanisation.
