= Spatuloricaria curvispina =

Conservation status
- Data Deficient (IUCN 3.1)

Scientific classification
- Kingdom: Animalia
- Phylum: Chordata
- Class: Actinopterygii
- Order: Siluriformes
- Family: Loricariidae
- Genus: Spatuloricaria
- Species: S. curvispina

Binomial name
- Spatuloricaria curvispina (Dahl, 1942)

Synonyms
- Loricaria curvispina Dahl, 1942

Species of catfish

Spatuloricaria curvispina is a species of freshwater ray-finned fish belonging to the family Loricariidae, the suckermouth armored catfishes, and the subfamily Loricariinae, the mailed catfishes. This catfish occurs in the Magdalena-Cauca basin in Colombia. The species reaches a standard length of 40 cm (16 in).
