= Chaetostoma marmorescens =

Conservation status
- Vulnerable (IUCN 3.1)

Scientific classification
- Kingdom: Animalia
- Phylum: Chordata
- Class: Actinopterygii
- Order: Siluriformes
- Family: Loricariidae
- Genus: Chaetostoma
- Species: C. marmorescens

Binomial name
- Chaetostoma marmorescens C. H. Eigenmann & Allen, 1942

Species of catfish

Chaetostoma marmorescens is a species of freshwater ray-finned fish belonging to the family Loricariidae, the suckermouth armoured catfishes, and the subfamily Hypostominae, the suckermouth catfishes. This catfish is endemic to Peru where it is known to occurs in two sites in the upper Huallaga River system in Huánuco. It is as a benthic species of high altitudes. This species reaches a standard length of 13.5 cm (5.3 in). The International Union for Conservation of Nature have assessed this speciesa Vulnerable because of its very restricted range where it is threatened by hydroelectric schemes.
