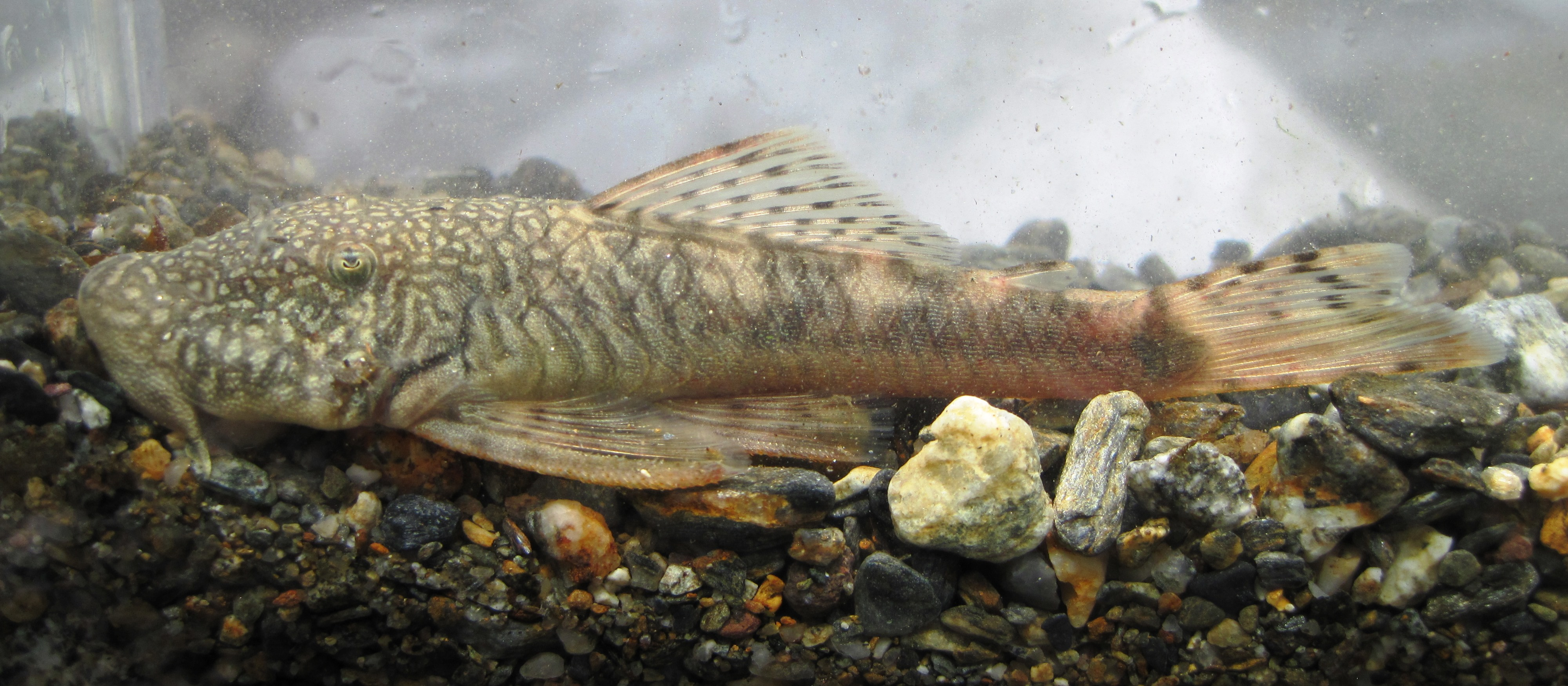

Conservation status
- Least Concern (IUCN 3.1)

Scientific classification
- Kingdom: Animalia
- Phylum: Chordata
- Class: Actinopterygii
- Order: Siluriformes
- Family: Loricariidae
- Genus: Chaetostoma
- Species: C. leucomelas

Binomial name
- Chaetostoma leucomelas C. H. Eigenmann, 1918

Synonyms
- Chaetostomus leucomelas C. H. Eigenmann, 1918

= Chaetostoma leucomelas =

Species of catfish

Chaetostoma leucomelas is a species of freshwater ray-finned fish belonging to the family Loricariidae, the suckermouth armoured catfishes, and the subfamily Hypostominae, the suckermouth catfishes. This catfish is endemic to Colombia where it occurs in the Patía, Maguí, Telembí, Calima and the Upper Cauca rivers, which deain into the Pacific Ocean, and in the Caribbean flowing Atrato river basin in Chocó. This species reaches a standard length of 20 cm (7.9 in).
