= Chaetostoma stannii =

Conservation status
- Endangered (IUCN 3.1)

Scientific classification
- Kingdom: Animalia
- Phylum: Chordata
- Class: Actinopterygii
- Order: Siluriformes
- Family: Loricariidae
- Genus: Chaetostoma
- Species: C. stannii

Binomial name
- Chaetostoma stannii Lütken, 1874

Synonyms
- Chaetostomus stannii Lütken, 1874

Species of fish

Chaetostoma stannii is a species of freshwater ray-finned fish belonging to the family Loricariidae, the suckermouth armoured catfishes, and the subfamily Hypostominae, the suckermouth catfishes. This catfish is endemic to Venezuela where it is found in the Caribbean draining rivers of the Western Andean foothills in the Yaracuy, Aroa, Urama, Capa, Guarataro, Crucito and Carabobo rivers. It ranges from the mountain streams to the coasts but shows a preference for the fatsest streams with pebble beds. This species recahes a standard length of 20.5 cm (8.1 in). The Specific name honours the German anatomist, physiologist and entomologist Hermann Friedrich Stannius who got the holotype from "Karsten", thought to be the German botanist Gustav Karl Wilhelm Hermann Karsten, who possibly collected it in Venezuela. The International Union for Conservation of Nature have assessed that this species is Endangered because it has a restricted range and its habitats are threatened by agriculture and pollution.
