= Chaetostoma machiquense =

Scientific classification
- Kingdom: Animalia
- Phylum: Chordata
- Class: Actinopterygii
- Order: Siluriformes
- Family: Loricariidae
- Genus: Chaetostoma
- Species: C. machiquense

Binomial name
- Chaetostoma machiquense Fernández-Yépez & Martín Salazar, 1953

Synonyms
- Chaetostoma machiquensis Fernández-Yépez & Martín Salazar, 1953

Species of catfish

Chaetostoma machiquense is a species of freshwater ray-finned fish belonging to the family Loricariidae, the suckermouth armoured catfishes, and the subfamily Hypostominae, the suckermouth catfishes. This catfish is endemic to Venezuela where it occurs in Negro River basin in the Lake Maracaibo drainage. This species reaches a standard length of 6.6 cm (2.6 in).
