= Chaetostoma orientale =

Scientific classification
- Kingdom: Animalia
- Phylum: Chordata
- Class: Actinopterygii
- Order: Siluriformes
- Family: Loricariidae
- Genus: Chaetostoma
- Species: C. orientale

Binomial name
- Chaetostoma orientale Meza-Vargas, Calegari, Lujan, Ballen, Oyakawa, Sousa, Rapp Py-Daniel & Reis, 2022

Species of fish

Chaetostoma orientale s a species of freshwater ray-finned fish belonging to the family Loricariidae, the suckermouth armoured catfishes, and the subfamily Hypostominae, the suckermouth catfishes. This species has been found in two rivers in Pará State, Brazil.
