= Transancistrus aequinoctialis =

Conservation status
- Least Concern (IUCN 3.1)

Scientific classification
- Kingdom: Animalia
- Phylum: Chordata
- Class: Actinopterygii
- Division: Teleostei
- Order: Siluriformes
- Family: Loricariidae
- Genus: Transancistrus
- Species: T. aequinoctialis

Binomial name
- Transancistrus aequinoctialis (Pellegrin, 1909)

Synonyms
- Chaetostoma aequinoctiale Pellegrin, 1909; Chaetostomus aequinoctialis Pellegrin, 1909

Species of catfish

Transancistrus aequinoctialis is a species of freshwater ray-finned fish belonging to the family Loricariidae, the suckermouth armoured catfishes, and the subfamily Hypostominae, the suckermouth catfishes. This catfish is endemic to Ecuador where it occurs in the drainage systems of the Mira, Esmeraldas, Guayas and in El Oro. This species reaches a standard length of 9 cm (3.5 in).
