= Chaetostoma anale =

Conservation status
- Data Deficient (IUCN 3.1)

Scientific classification
- Kingdom: Animalia
- Phylum: Chordata
- Class: Actinopterygii
- Order: Siluriformes
- Family: Loricariidae
- Genus: Chaetostoma
- Species: C. anale

Binomial name
- Chaetostoma anale (Fowler, 1943)

Synonyms
- Hypocolpterus analis Fowler, 1943; Chaetostoma analis (Fowler 1943); Chaetostomus vagus Fowler, 1943; Chaetostoma vaga Fowler,1943; Chaetostoma alternifasciatum Fowler, 1945; Chatostoma alternifasciatus Fowler, 1945

Species of catfish

Chaetostoma anale is a species of freshwater ray-finned fish belonging to the family Loricariidae, the suckermouth armoured catfishes, and the subfamily Hypostominae, the suckermouth catfishes. This catfish is endemic to Colombia where it occurs in the Orteguaza River basin, which is part of the Japurá River drainage in Colombia. The species reaches a standard length of 16 cm (6.3 in).

== Taxonomy ==
Chaetostoma anale was first formally described as Hypocolpterus analis in 1943 by the American biologist Henry Weed Fowler with its type locality given as Río Orteguasa, Florencia, Caquetá in Colombia. Fowler also described Chaetostomus vagus in 1943, with its type locality given as the same as C. anale, and in 1945 he described Chaetostoma alternifasciatum, giving its type locality as Morelia in Caquetá. These two taxa are now considered to be junior synonyms of Chaetostoma anale. Eschmeyer's Catalog of Fishes classifies the genus Chaetostoma in the subfamily Hypostominae, the suckermouth catfishes, within the suckermouth armored catfish family Loricariidae. It has also been classified in the tribe Ancistrini by some authorities.

== Etymology ==
Chaetostoma anale is classified in the genus Chaetostoma, this name combines chaeto-, derived from the Greek chaítē, meaning "long hair", with stoma, which means "mouth", an allusion to the britsles on the cheeks of males. The specific name, anale, is a reference to the large anal fin of this species which is equal in length with the pectoral fin.

== Conservation status ==
Chaetsoma anale is classified as Data Deficient by the International Union for Conservation of Nature, as are the two synonymous taxa, because there is insufficient data on their range, population and biology.
