= Chaetostoma patiae =

Conservation status
- Least Concern (IUCN 3.1)

Scientific classification
- Kingdom: Animalia
- Phylum: Chordata
- Class: Actinopterygii
- Order: Siluriformes
- Family: Loricariidae
- Genus: Chaetostoma
- Species: C. patiae

Binomial name
- Chaetostoma patiae Fowler, 1945

Species of catfish

Chaetostoma patiae is a species of freshwater ray-finned fish belonging to the family Loricariidae, the suckermouth armoured catfishes, and the subfamily Hypostominae, the suckermouth catfishes. This catfish is endemic to Colombia where it is found in the basins of the Patía and Mira River basins. This species reaches a standard length of 15.8 cm (6.2 in). The specific name refers to the type locality in the Patia River.
