= Chaetostoma changae =

Conservation status
- Endangered (IUCN 3.1)

Scientific classification
- Kingdom: Animalia
- Phylum: Chordata
- Class: Actinopterygii
- Order: Siluriformes
- Family: Loricariidae
- Genus: Chaetostoma
- Species: C. changae

Binomial name
- Chaetostoma changae Salcedo, 2006

Species of fish

Chaetostoma changae is a species of freshwater ray-finned fish belonging to the family Loricariidae, the suckermouth armoured catfishes, and the subfamily Hypostominae, the suckermouth catfishes. This catfish is endemic to Peru where it occurs in the Upper Huallaga River in Tingo María, Huánuco. This catfish reaches a standard length of 7.6 cm (3.0 in). The specificname, changae, honours the Peruvian ichthyologist Fonchii Chang, This species is classified by the IUCN as Endangered because it has a restricted range which is being threatened by pollution of the watercourses from mining activities, urban waste, the run-off from illegal drug production, the herbicides sprayed on the coca plantations by the authorities and deforestation.
