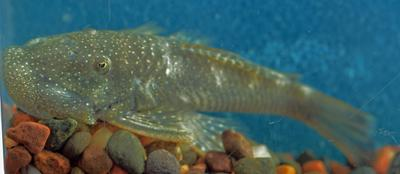

Conservation status
- Vulnerable (IUCN 3.1)

Scientific classification
- Kingdom: Animalia
- Phylum: Chordata
- Class: Actinopterygii
- Order: Siluriformes
- Family: Loricariidae
- Genus: Chaetostoma
- Species: C. formosae

Binomial name
- Chaetostoma formosae Ballen, 2011

= Chaetostoma formosae =

Species of catfish

Chaetostoma formosae is a species of freshwater ray-finned fish belonging to the family Loricariidae, the suckermouth armoured catfishes, and the subfamily Hypostominae, the suckermouth catfishes. This catfish is endemic to Colombia where it is only found in piedmont and mountain rivers and the Meta and Guaviare drainages. It prefers clear, well oxygentated streams with a fast current and a rocky streambed with scattered boulders and pebbles. This species reaches a standard length of 9.7 cm (3.8 in). C. formosae is sometimes seen in the aquarium trade, where it is known as the rubberlip pleco or referred to by its L-number, L-444. The International Union for Conservation of Nature classify this catfish as Vulnerable despite it still being relatively common because in some drainages where it is found the habitat is threatened by deforestation, land-use change, pollution and siltation.
