= Transancistrus santarosensis =

Conservation status
- Least Concern (IUCN 3.1)

Scientific classification
- Kingdom: Animalia
- Phylum: Chordata
- Class: Actinopterygii
- Division: Teleostei
- Order: Siluriformes
- Family: Loricariidae
- Genus: Transancistrus
- Species: T. santarosensis

Binomial name
- Transancistrus santarosensis (M. Tan & Armbruster, 2012)

Synonyms
- Cordylancistrus santarosensis M. Tan & Armbruster, 2012

Species of catfish

Transancistrus santarosensis is a species of freshwater ray-finned fish belonging to the family Loricariidae, the suckermouth armoured catfishes, and the subfamily Hypostominae, the suckermouth catfishes. This catfish is endemic to Ecuador where it occurs in the basin of the Santa Rosa River, which is part of the Gulf of Guayaquil drainage. This species reaches a standard length of 7.7 cm (3.0 in).
