= Chaetostoma branickii =

Conservation status
- Vulnerable (IUCN 3.1)

Scientific classification
- Kingdom: Animalia
- Phylum: Chordata
- Class: Actinopterygii
- Order: Siluriformes
- Family: Loricariidae
- Genus: Chaetostoma
- Species: C. branickii

Binomial name
- Chaetostoma branickii Steindachner, 1881

Synonyms
- Chaetostomus branickii Steindachner, 1881; Chaetostomus brevis Regan, 1904; Chaetostoma brevis Regan, 1904; Chaetostoma breve Regan, 1904

Species of catfish

Chaetostoma branickii is a species of freshwater ray-finned fish belonging to the family Loricariidae, the suckermouth armoured catfishes, and the subfamily Hypostominae, the suckermouth catfishes. This catfish is endemic to Peru where it is known from the Upper Chamaya River basin in the upper drainage of the Marañón River, the upper Cenepa and Huachi Rivers, and from its type locality in the Chota River. This species reaches a standard length of 13.2 cm (5.2 in). The specific name, branickii, was notexplained by the species describer, Franz Steindachner, but it is likely to be Hieronim Florian Radziwill Konstanty, Count Branicki, a Polish aristocrat, who employed the ornithologist Jan Sztolcman, the collector of the holotype.
