= Spatuloricaria fimbriata =

Conservation status
- Data Deficient (IUCN 3.1)

Scientific classification
- Kingdom: Animalia
- Phylum: Chordata
- Class: Actinopterygii
- Order: Siluriformes
- Family: Loricariidae
- Genus: Spatuloricaria
- Species: S. fimbriata

Binomial name
- Spatuloricaria fimbriata (C. H. Eigenmann & Vance, 1912)

Synonyms
- Loricaria fimbriata C. H. Eigenmann & Vance, 1912

Species of catfish

Spatuloricaria fimbriata is a species of freshwater ray-finned fish belonging to the family Loricariidae, the suckermouth armored catfishes, and the subfamily Loricariinae, the mailed catfishes. This catfish occurs in the basins of the Tuira River and the Magdalena River in Panama and Colombia. The species reaches a standard length of 8.4 cm (3.3 in).
