= Chaetostoma joropo =

Conservation status
- Vulnerable (IUCN 3.1)

Scientific classification
- Kingdom: Animalia
- Phylum: Chordata
- Class: Actinopterygii
- Order: Siluriformes
- Family: Loricariidae
- Genus: Chaetostoma
- Species: C. joropo

Binomial name
- Chaetostoma joropo Ballen, Urbano-Bonilla & Maldonado-Ocampo, 2016

Species of catfish

Chaetostoma joropo is a species of freshwater ray-finned fish belonging to the family Loricariidae, the suckermouth armoured catfishes, and the subfamily Hypostominae, the suckermouth catfishes. This catfish is endemic to Colombia where it occurs in the foothill rivers of the Orinoco Basin, and in the drainages of the Casanare, Meta and Guaviare Rivers. Its range extends from the Tocoragua River, municipalty of Tame, in Arauca to Vista Hermosa in the Department of Meta. It appears in the aquarium trade, where it is frequently referred to by its L-number, which is L-445. This species has reportedly been known to aquarists for quite some time prior to its 2016 scientific description. The International Union for Conservation of Nature assess this species a Vulnerable because its habitat is threatened by pollution, siltation, deforestation and land-use change.
