= Andrés Posada-Arango =

Colombian botanist and zoologist (1839–1922)

Andrés Posada Arango
- Born: February 11, 1839; Medellín, Colombia
- Died: March 13, 1922 (aged 83); Medellín, Colombia
- Scientific career
- Fields: Medicine, Botany, Zoology
- Author abbrev. (botany): Posada-Ar.
- Author abbrev. (zoology): A. Posada-Arango

Andrés Posada Arango (February 11, 1839 – March 13, 1922) was a Colombian physician, botanist, zoologist, and ichthyologist.

In 1862, after serving as a surgeon in the civil wars of 1860 and 1861, he returned to Medellín. In 1868, he traveled to Europe and, after visiting several countries, settled in Paris, where he pursued studies in Medicine and natural sciences. During this period, he published Viaje de América a Jerusalén (Journey from America to Jerusalem) and Ensayo etnográfico sobre los aborígenes del Estado de Antioquia en Colombia (Ethnographic Essay on the Indigenous Peoples of the State of Antioquia in Colombia).

== Selected scientific works ==
- 2010. Viaje de América a Jerusalén. Vol. 12 of Bicentenario de Antioquia. Editor: Univ. EAFIT. 197 pp. ISBN 9587200705
- 1909. Estudios científicos del doctor Andrés Posada: Con algunos otros escritos suyos sobre diversos temas y con ilustraciones ó grabados... Editor: C.A. Molina. 432 pp.
- 1871. Ensayo etnográfico sobre los aborígenes del estado de Antioquia en Colombia. Rouge Hnos. y Cía. 32 pp. Online – Reprinted by Kessinger Publishing (2010), 36 pp. ISBN 1169548342
- 1870. Extracto del diario de viaje que hizo Don Andrés Posada Arango de la América de Colombia a Loreto, Jerusalem y Roma en 1868. With Francisco Sotomayor. Editor: Impr. I. Escalante. 55 pp.

== Honors ==
=== Memberships ===
- Founder of the Academy of Medicine of Medellín; served as editor of its Annals and later as president.
- Co-founder of the Academia Antioqueña de Historia.
- Member of the Société Botanique de France.
- Member of the International Academy of Botanical Geography, France.

=== Awards ===
- Recipient of the International Scientific Medal.
- Knighted by the scientific society for his contributions.

=== Eponyms ===
- Posadaea (family: Cucurbitaceae)
- Vivero Dr. Andrés Posada-Arango, a nursery in Sopetrán, Antioquia
- Atractus arangoi – a species of snake named in his honor.
- The Morphology Building at the University of Antioquia is named after him.

== See also ==
- List of botanists by author abbreviation
- List of zoologists
