= Cedrorum azoricus =

Conservation status
- Endangered (IUCN 3.1)

Scientific classification
- Kingdom: Animalia
- Phylum: Arthropoda
- Class: Insecta
- Order: Coleoptera
- Suborder: Adephaga
- Family: Carabidae
- Genus: Cedrorum; Borges & Serrano, 1993
- Species: C. azoricus

Binomial name
- Cedrorum azoricus Borges & Serrano, 1993

Genus of beetles

Cedrorum azoricus is a species of beetle in the family Carabidae, the only species in the genus Cedrorum. It is native to the Azores archipelago.
