= List of amphibians of Madagascar =

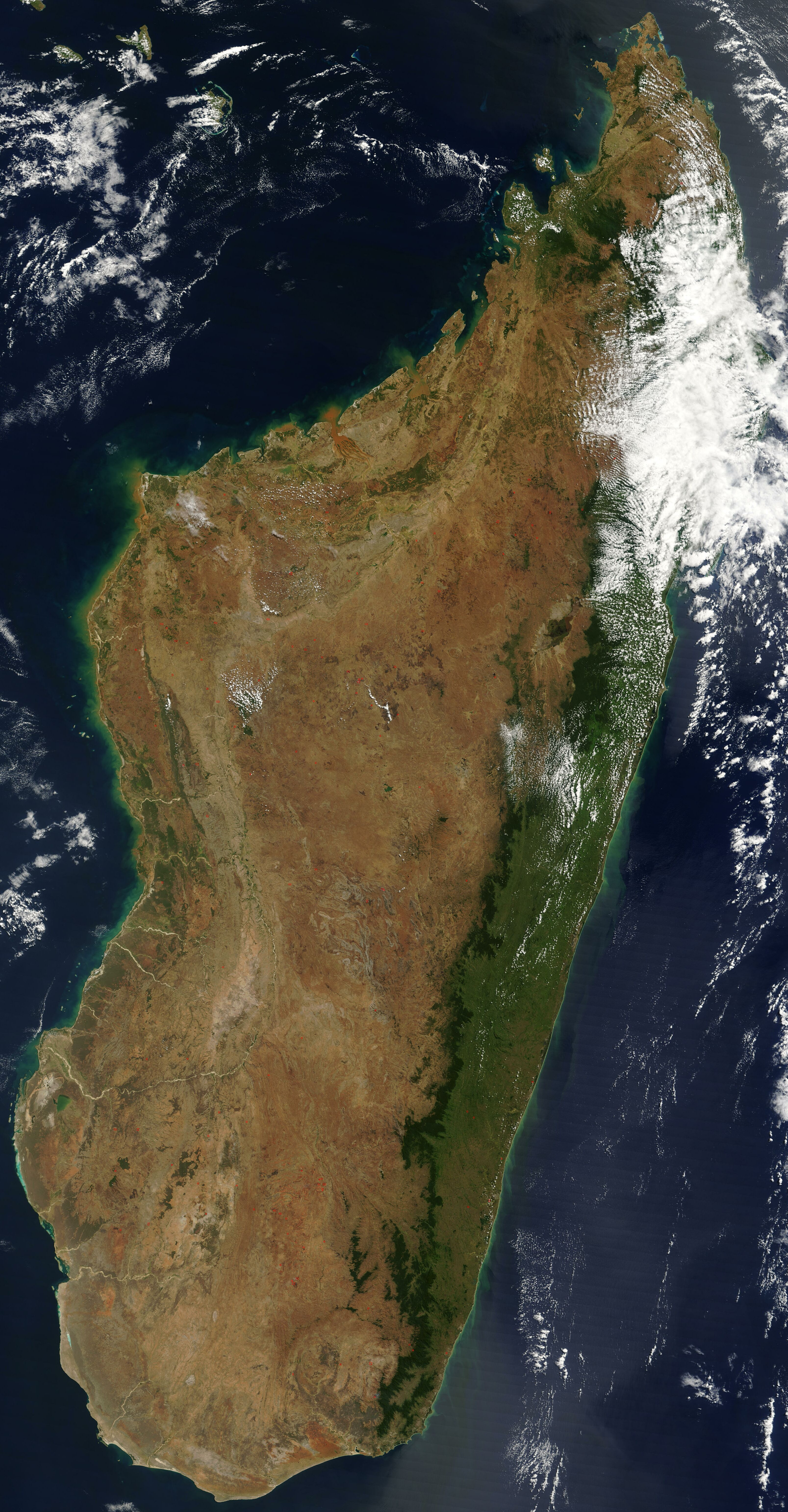
Satellite image of Madagascar from NASA

The population of amphibians of Madagascar is made up exclusively of frogs. There are 311 named species of frogs on Madagascar, but several hundred have been identified using DNA barcoding and remain to be formally described.

Native described species belong to four different families: Hyperoliidae (11 species), Mantellidae (212 species), Microhylidae (86 species) and Ranidae (1 species). Two further species are introduced: the ranid frog Hoplobatrachus tigrinus and the toad Duttaphrynus melanostictus. Almost all native species are endemic, with the exception of Ptychadena mascareniensis. 85 species are threatened with extinction, nine of which are considered by the IUCN as critically endangered. Their numbers are largely affected by major alterations of habitat due to deforestation and the expansion of paddy fields and villages, and to a lesser extent, by illegal international trade.

== Hyperoliidae ==
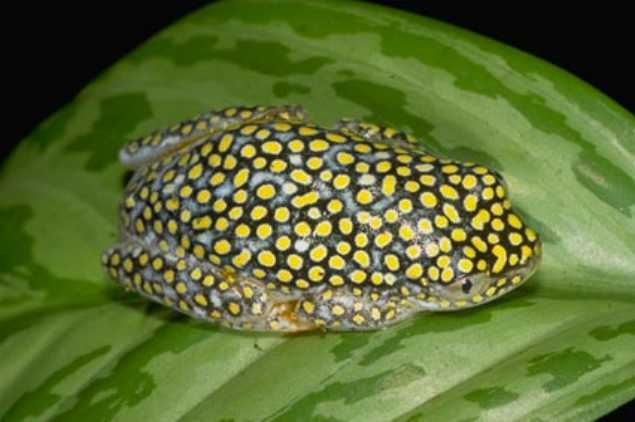
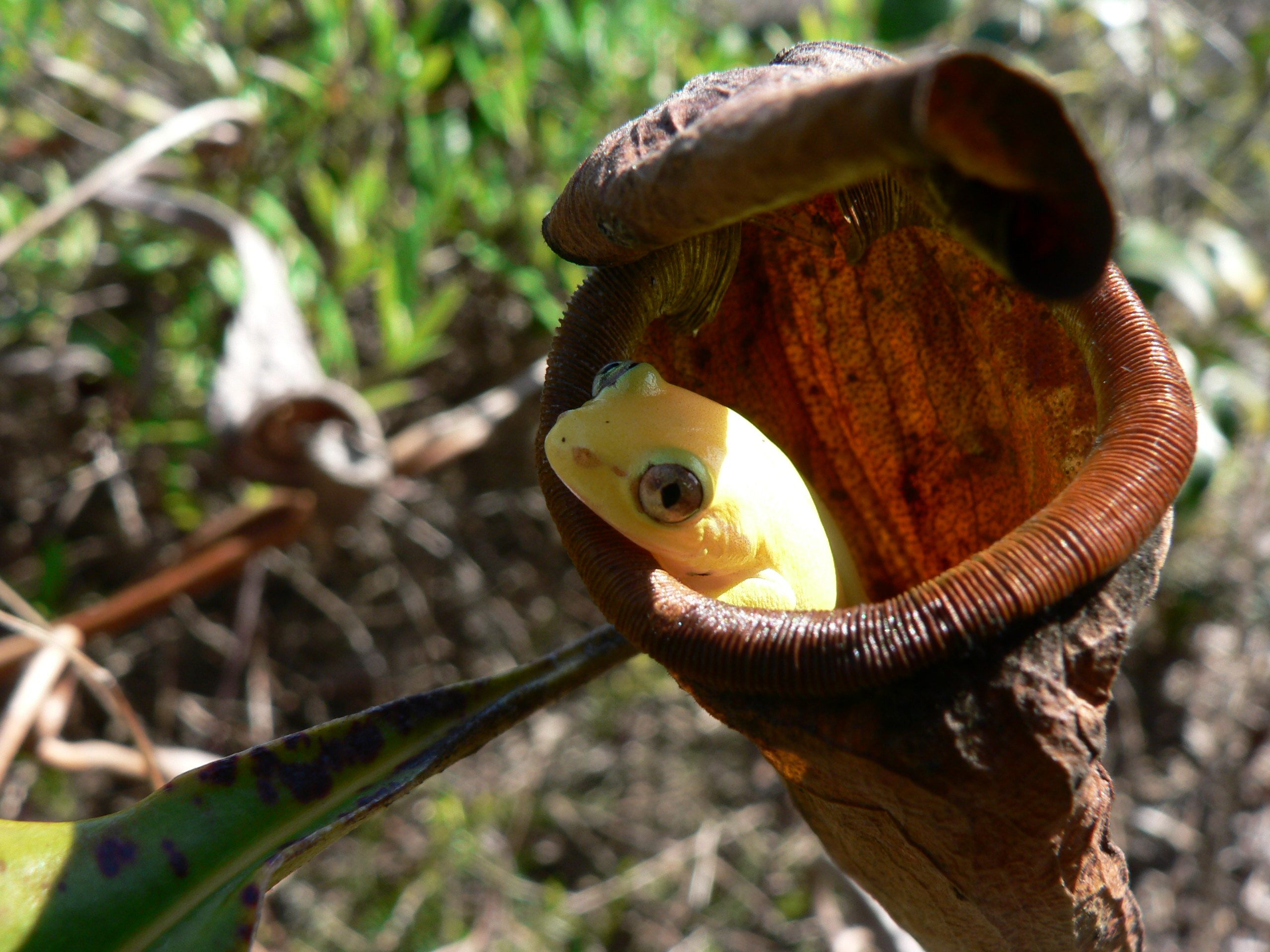
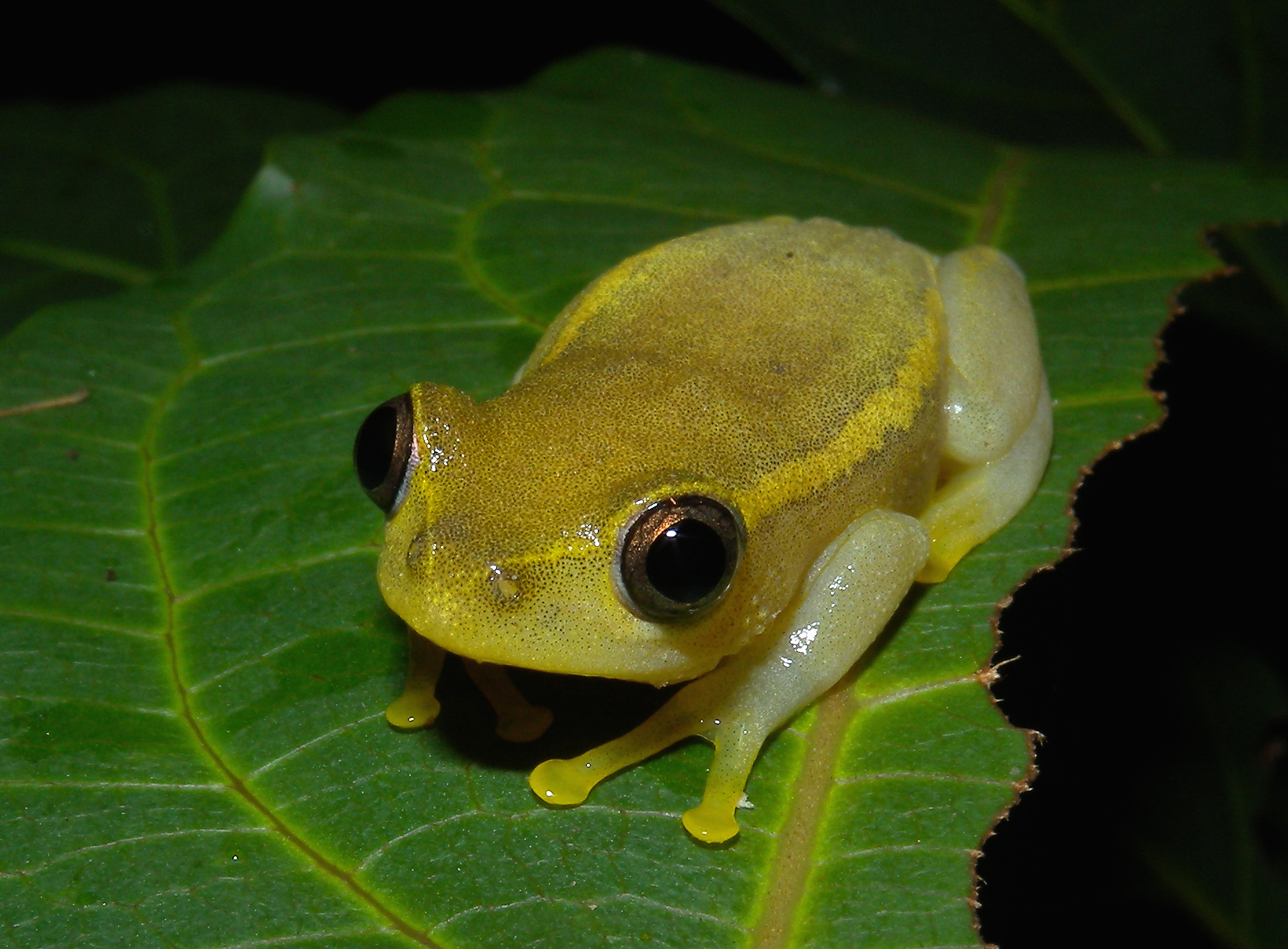
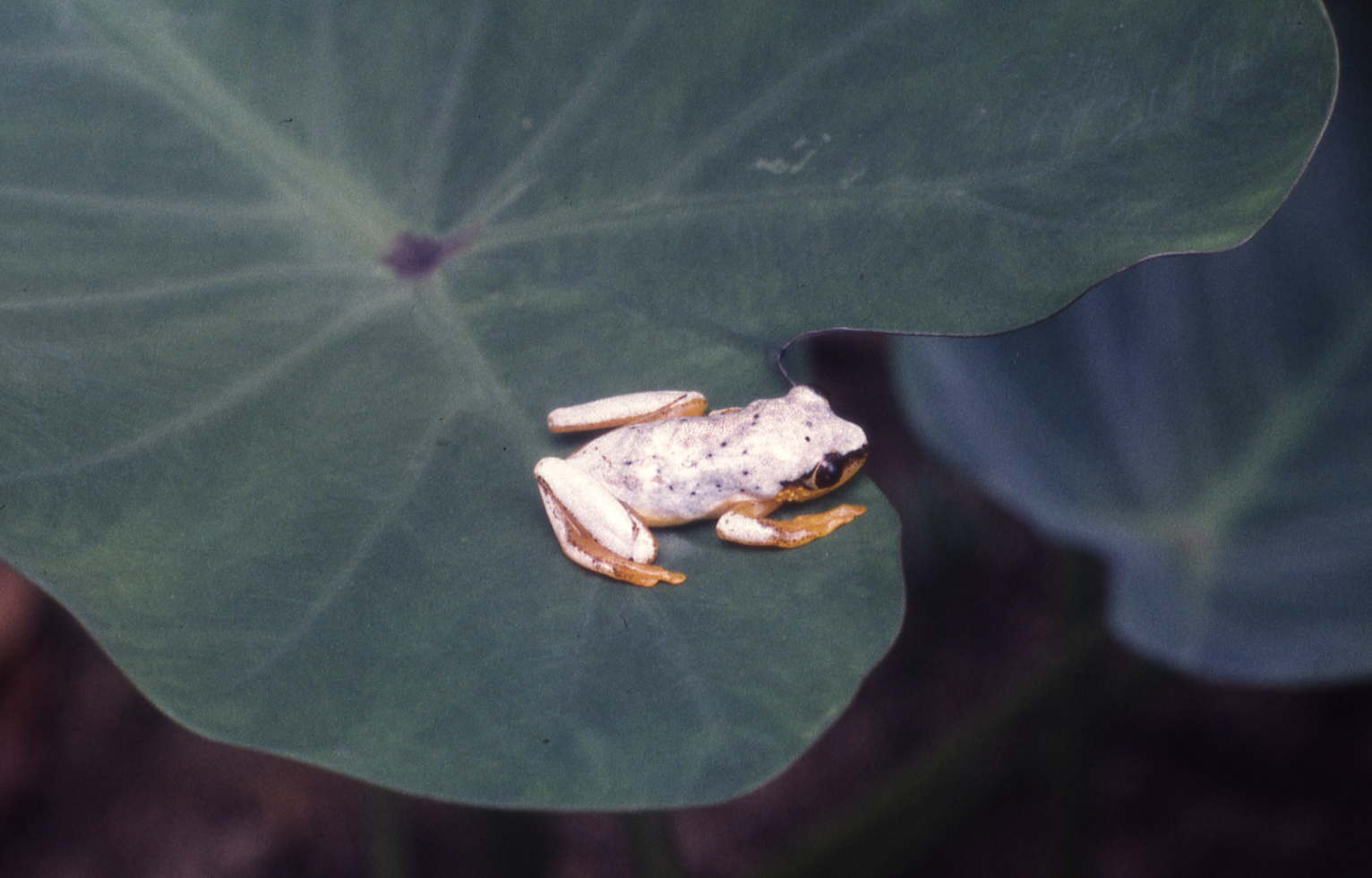
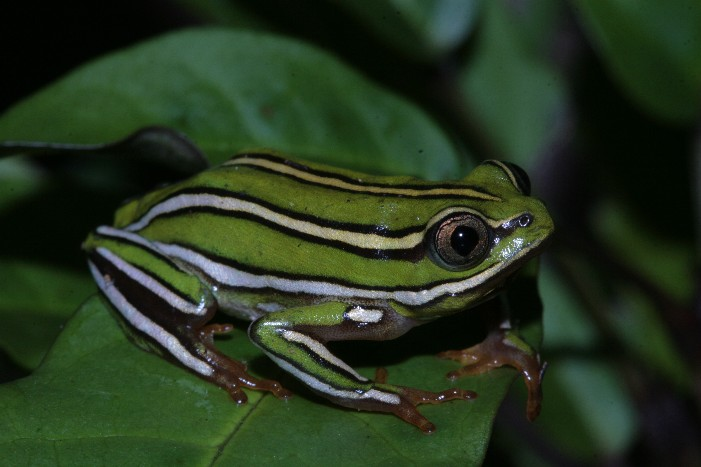
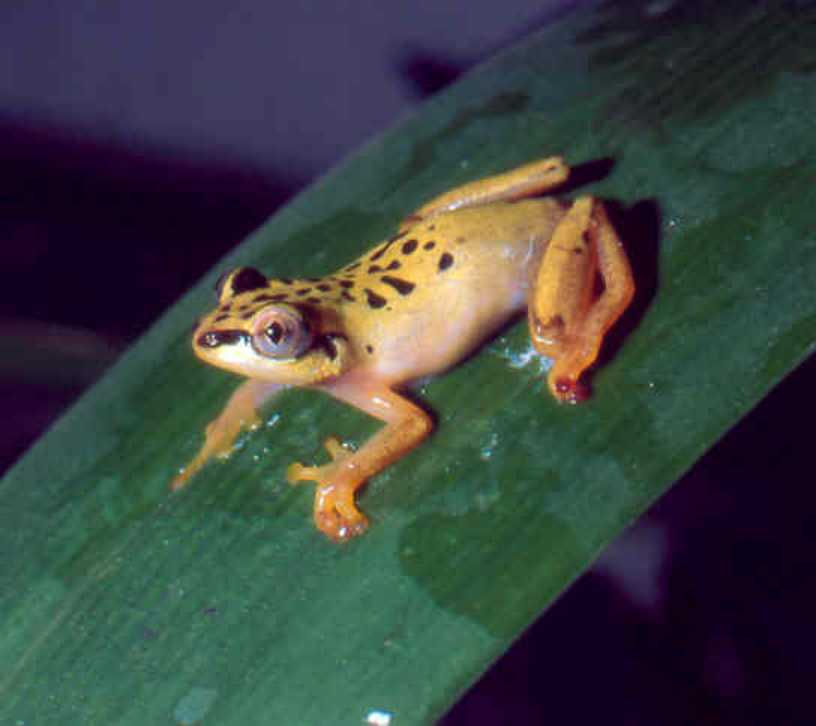
| Species | Status IUCN |
| Heterixalus alboguttatus |
| Heterixalus andrakata |
| Heterixalus betsileo |
| Heterixalus boettgeri |
| Heterixalus carbonei |
| Heterixalus luteostriatus |
| Heterixalus madagascariensis |
| Heterixalus punctatus |
| Heterixalus rutenbergi |
| Heterixalus tricolor |
| Heterixalus variabilis |

== Mantellidae ==
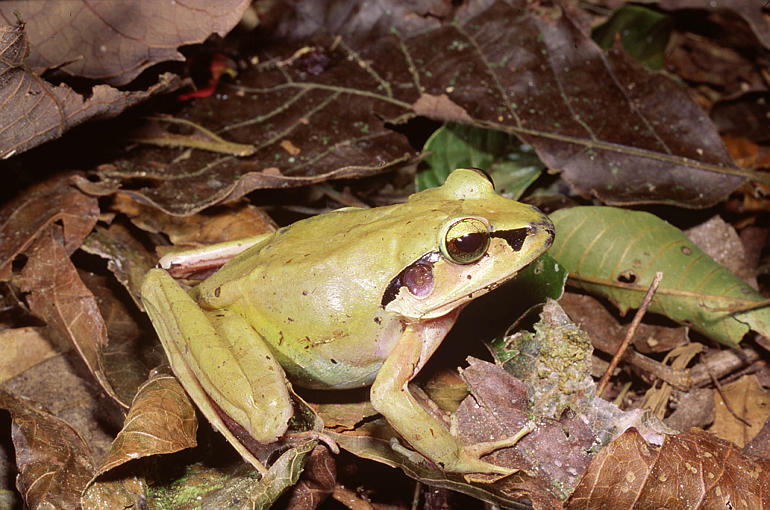
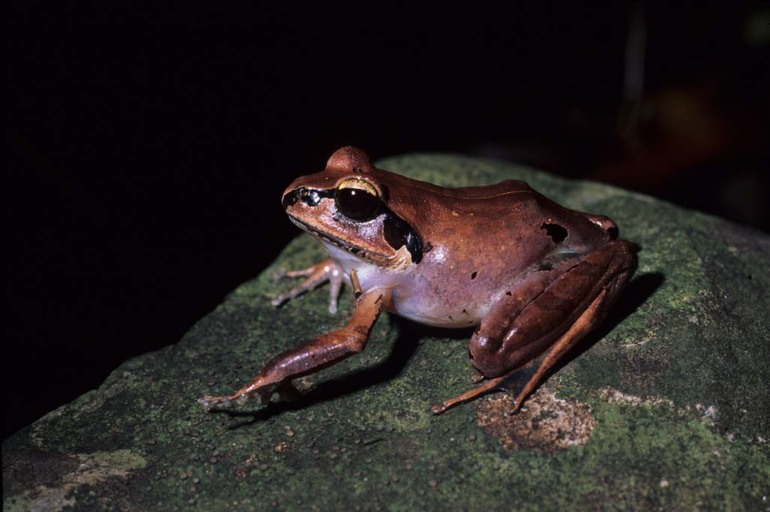
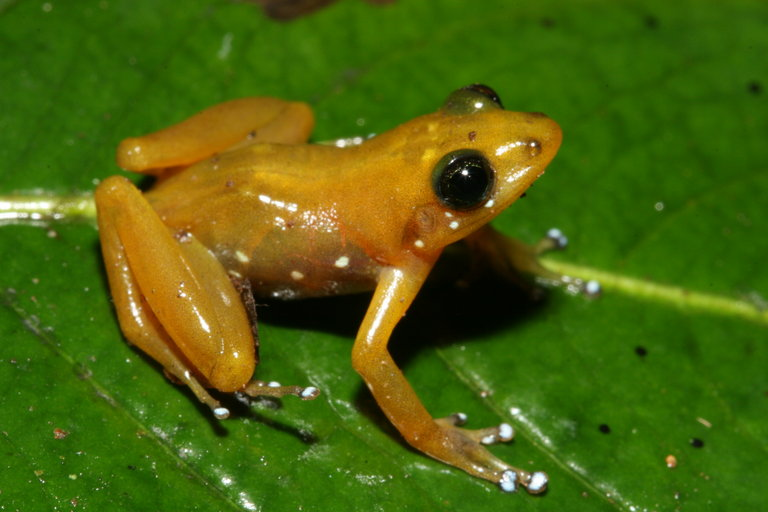
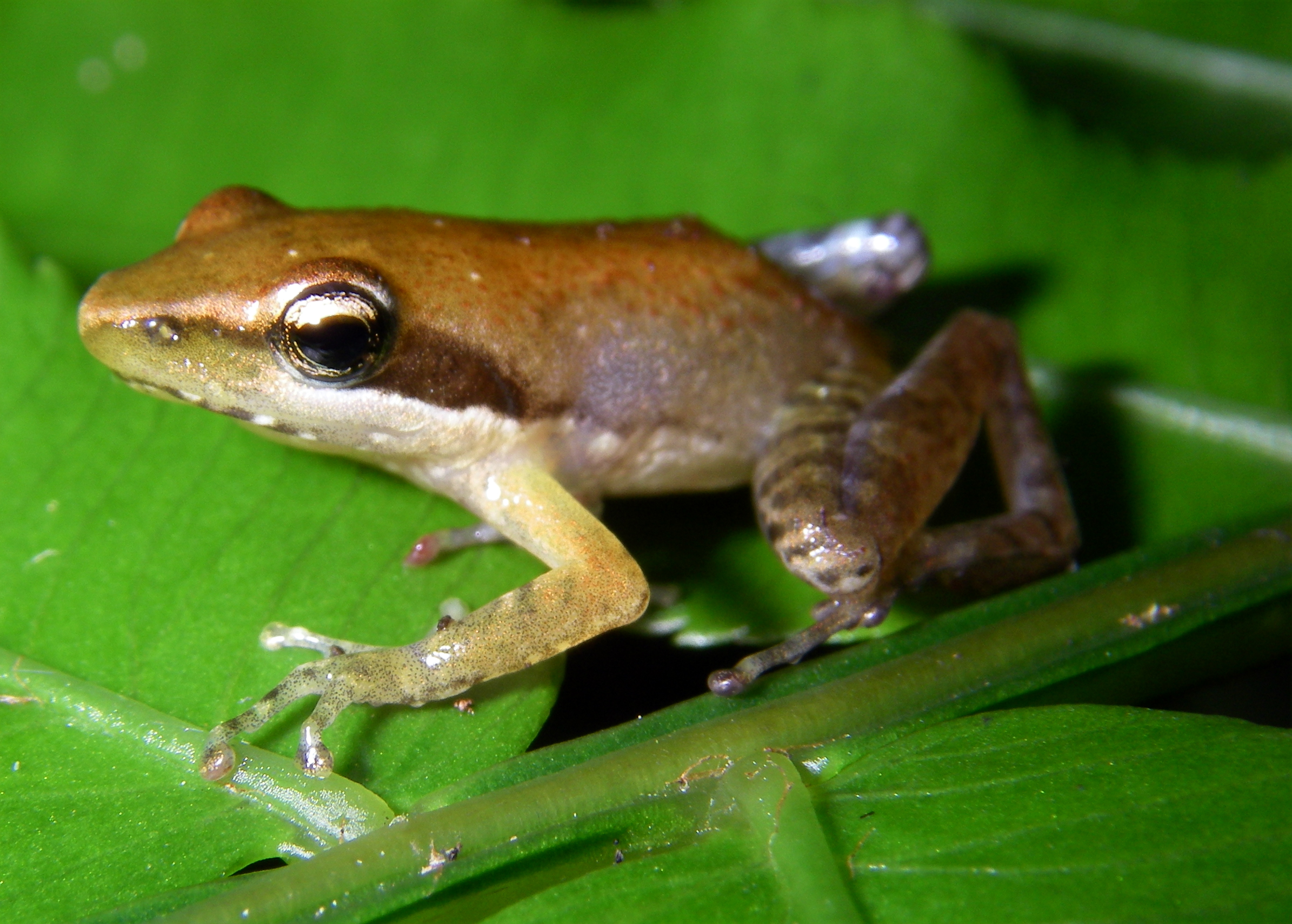
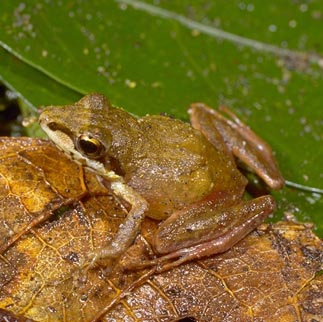
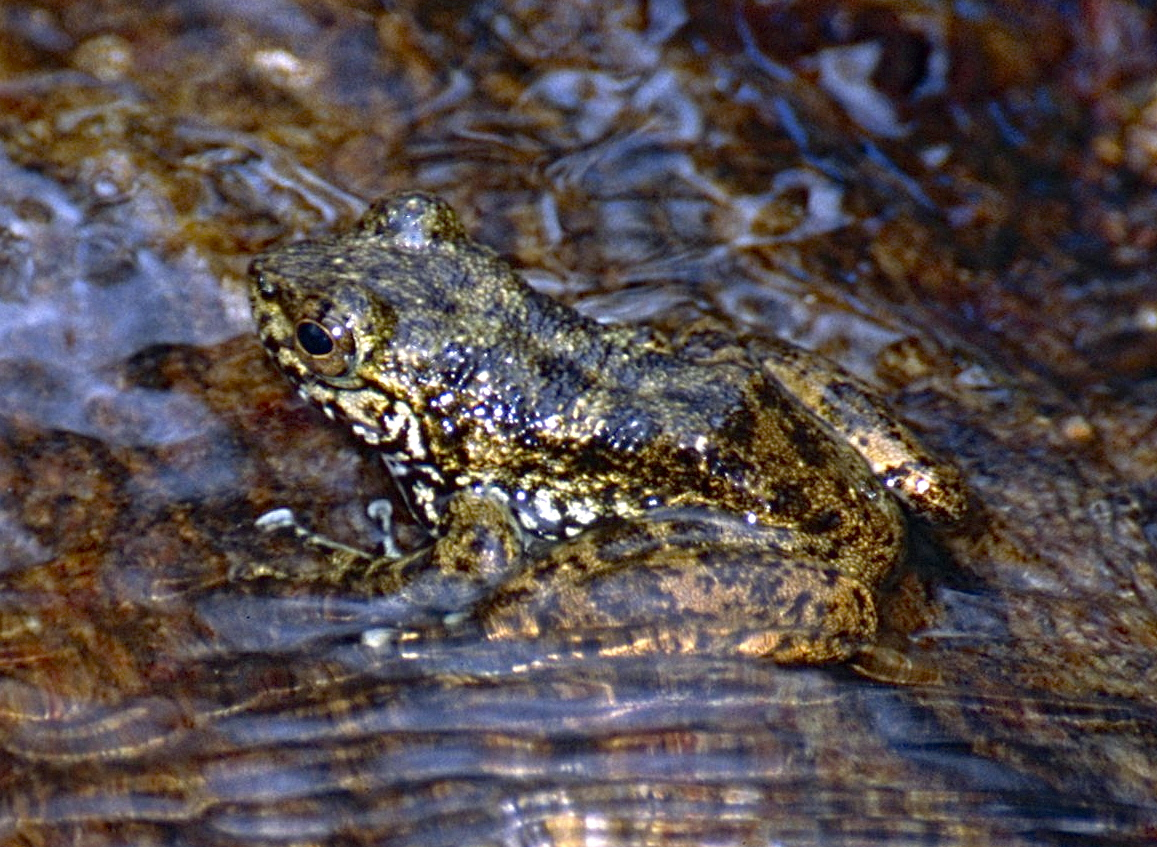
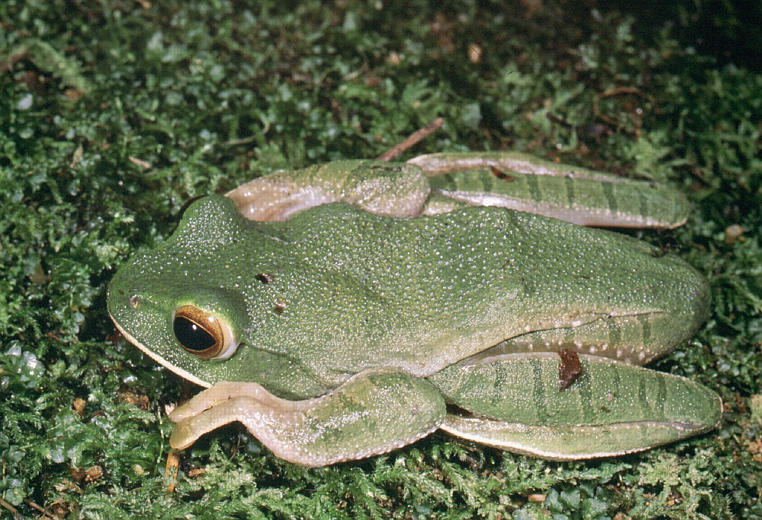
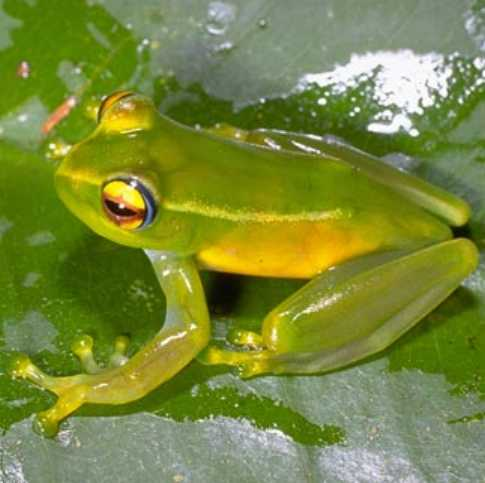
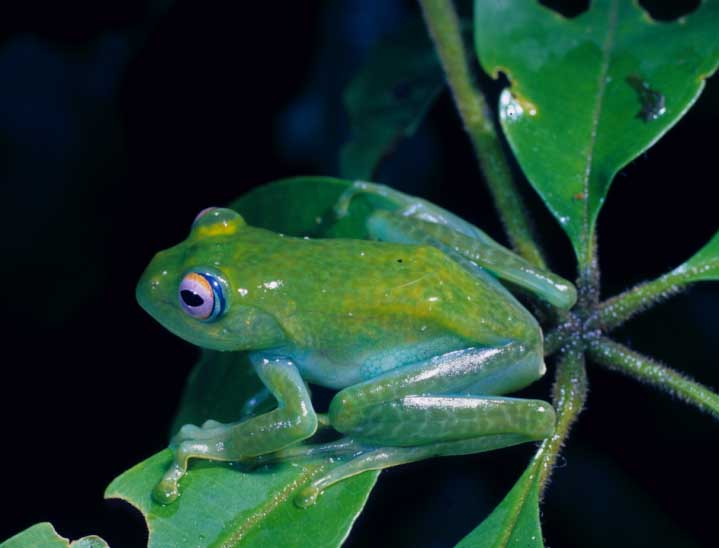
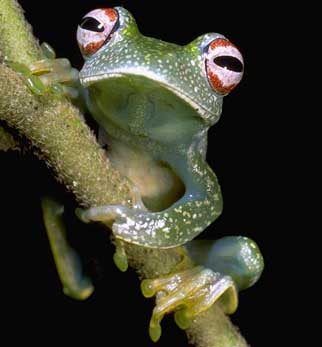
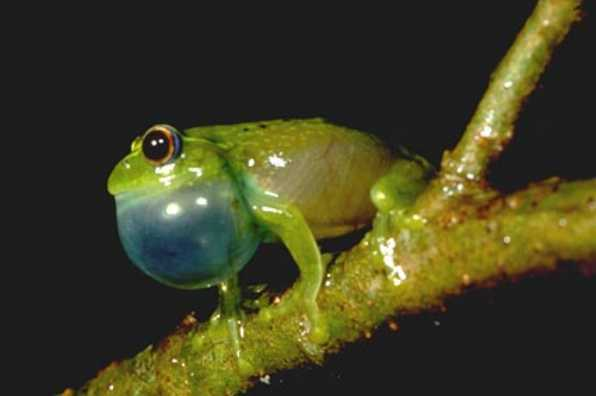
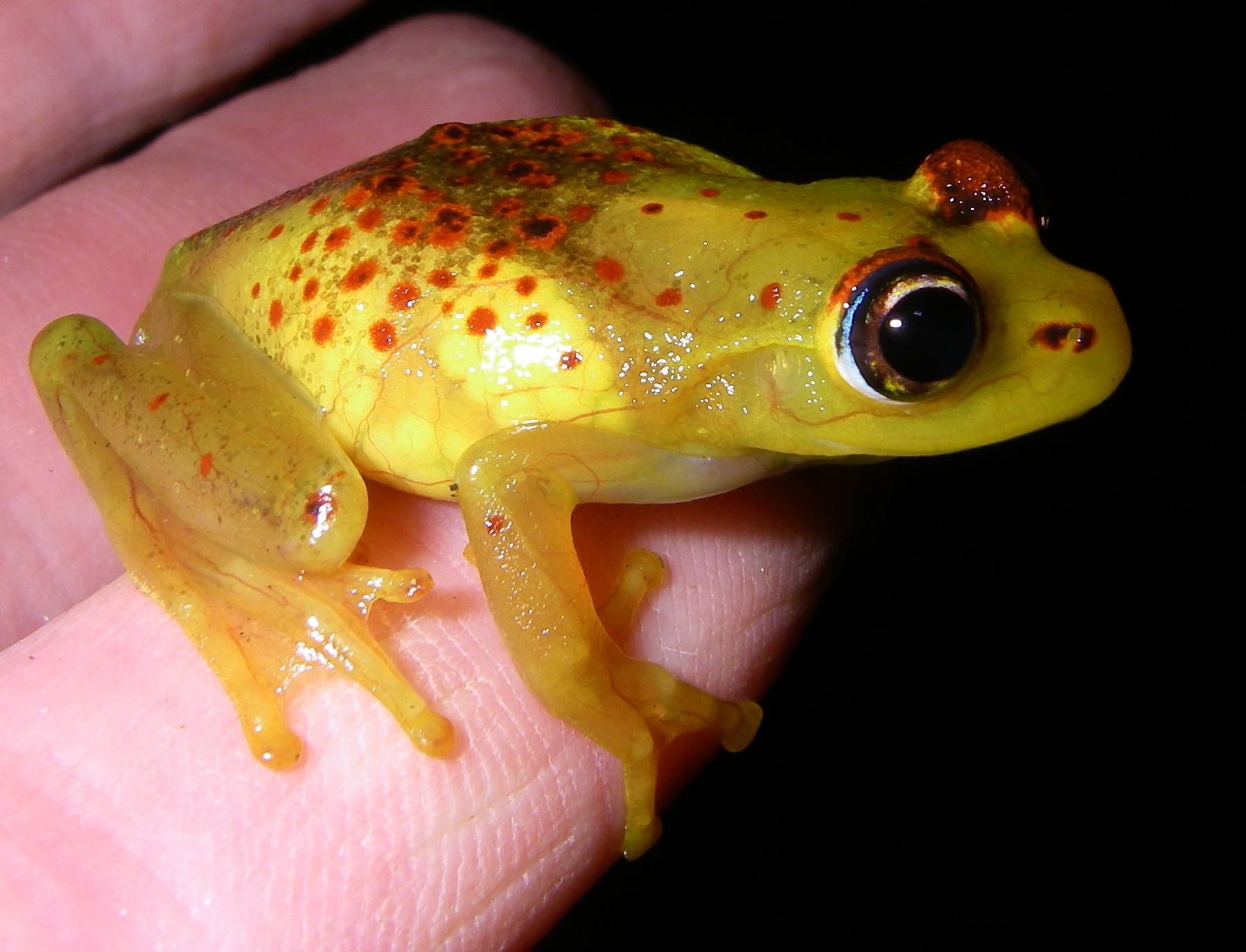
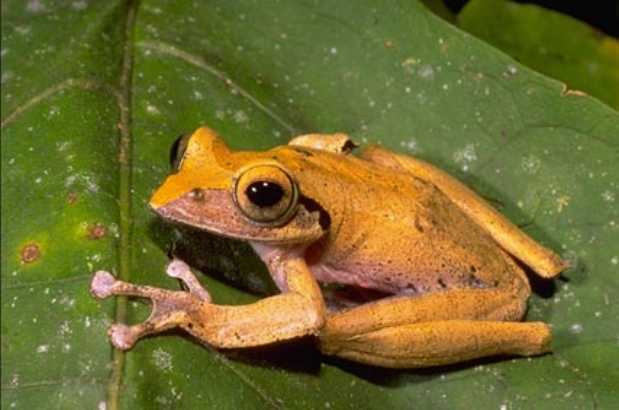
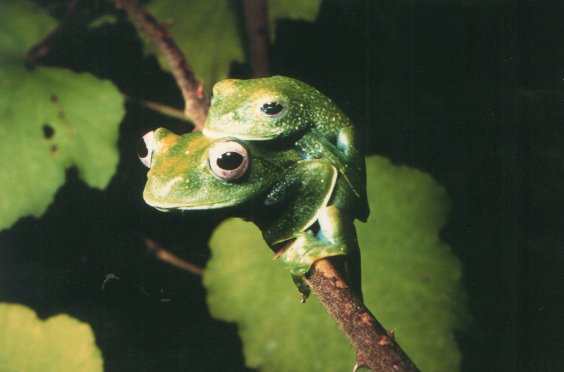
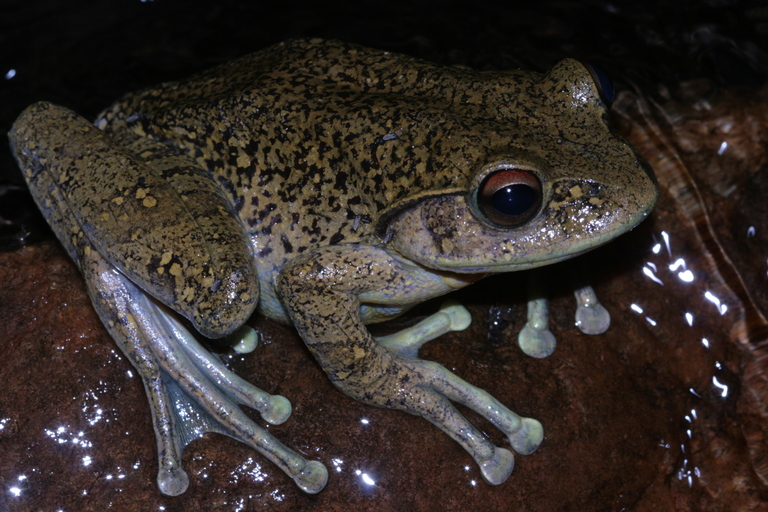
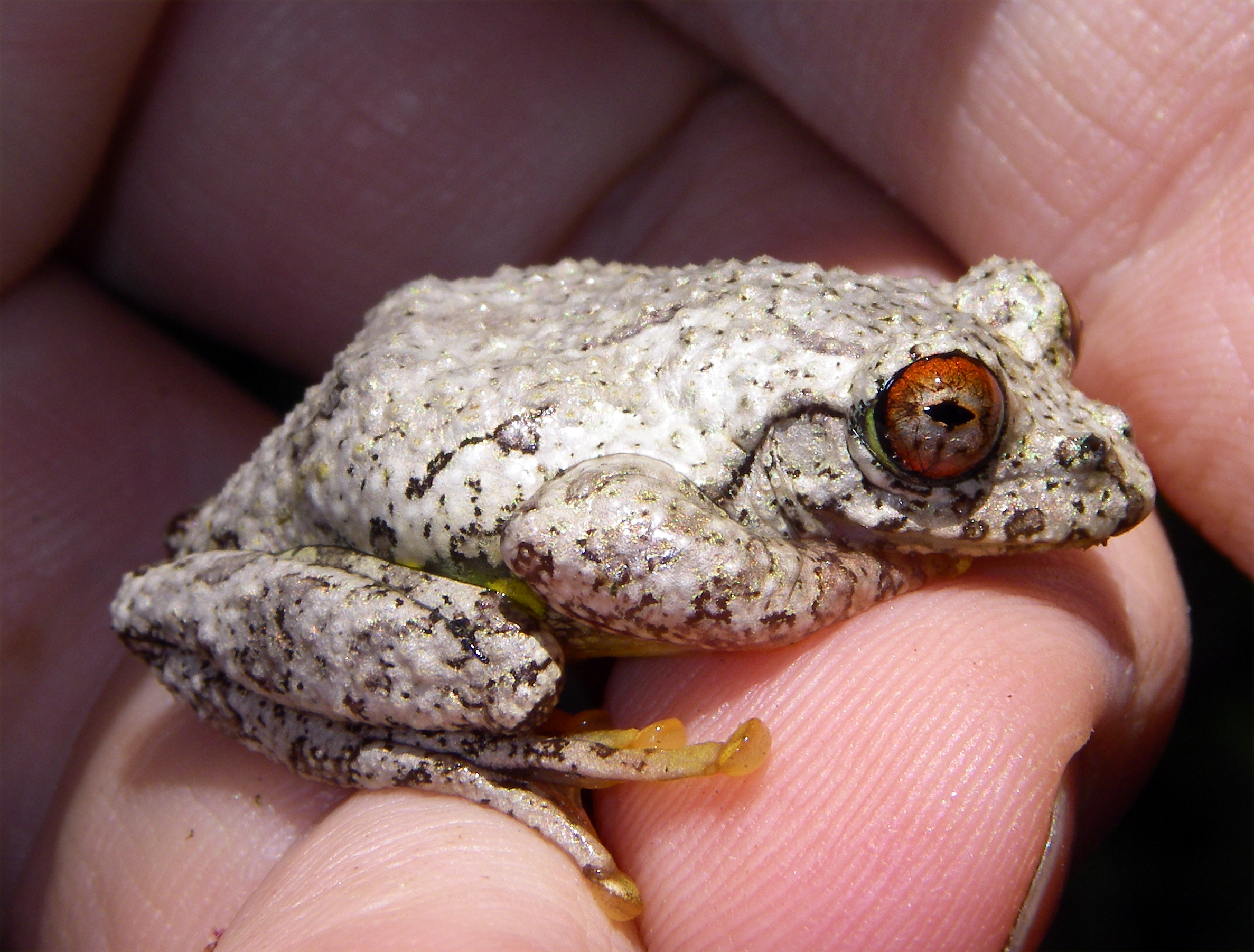
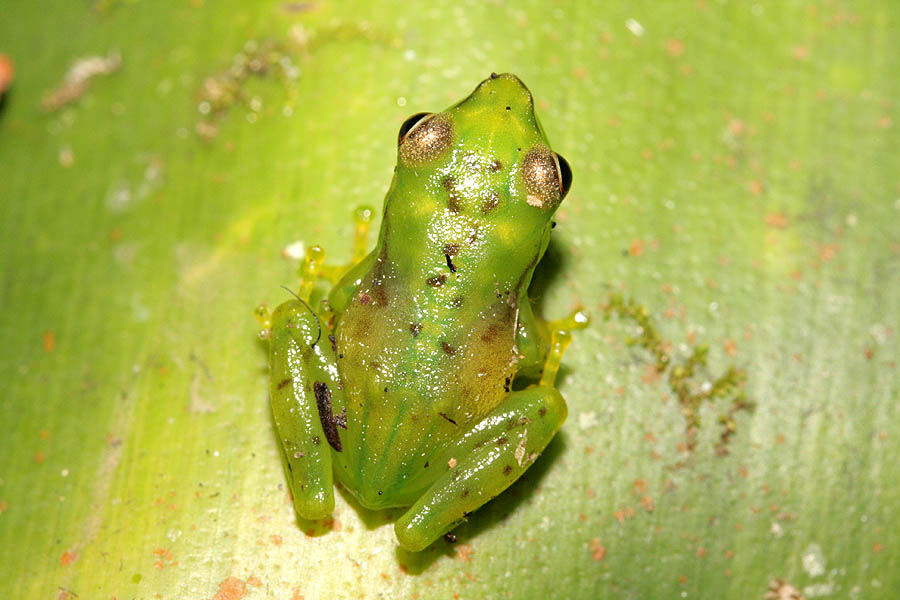
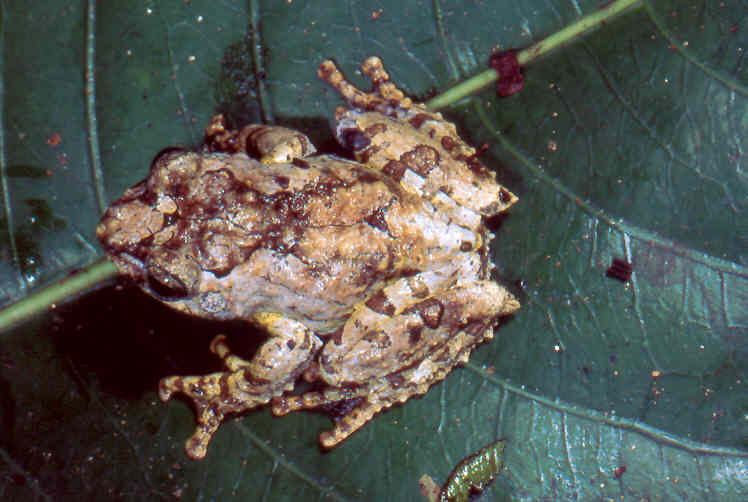
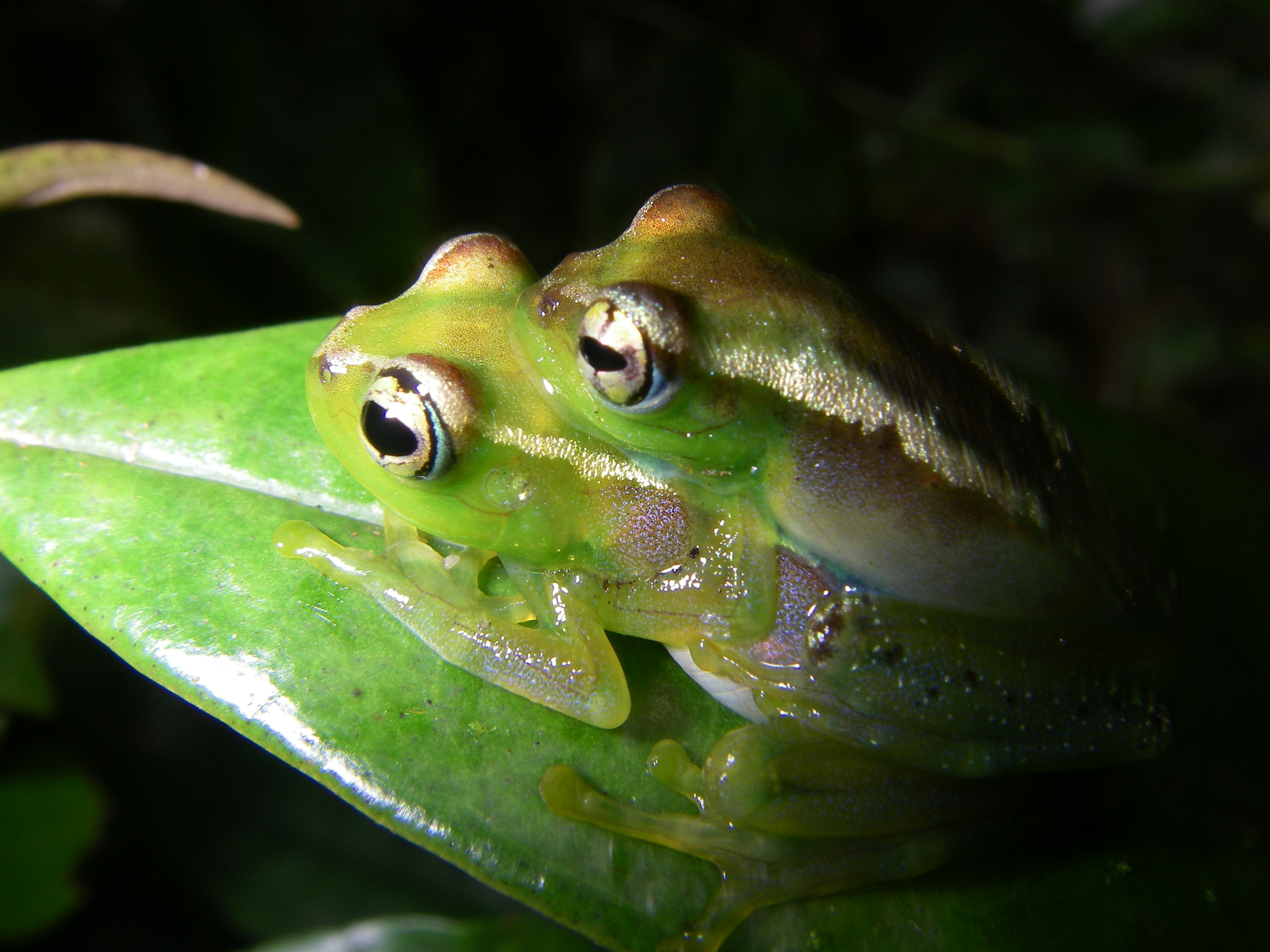
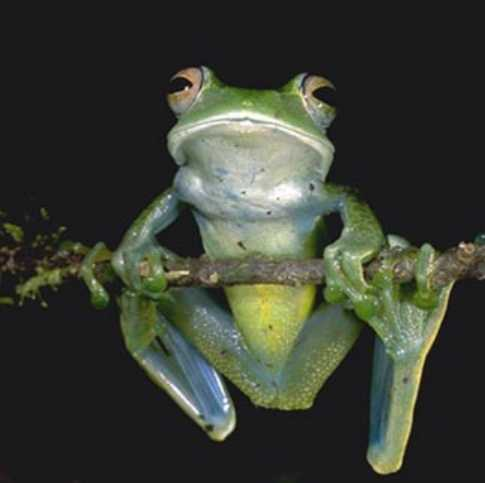
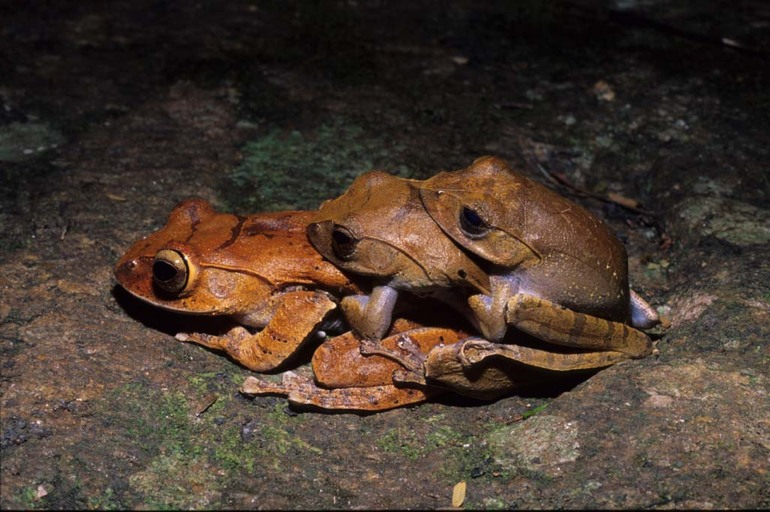
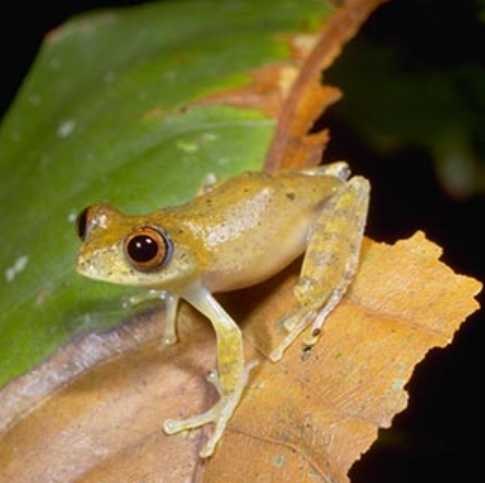
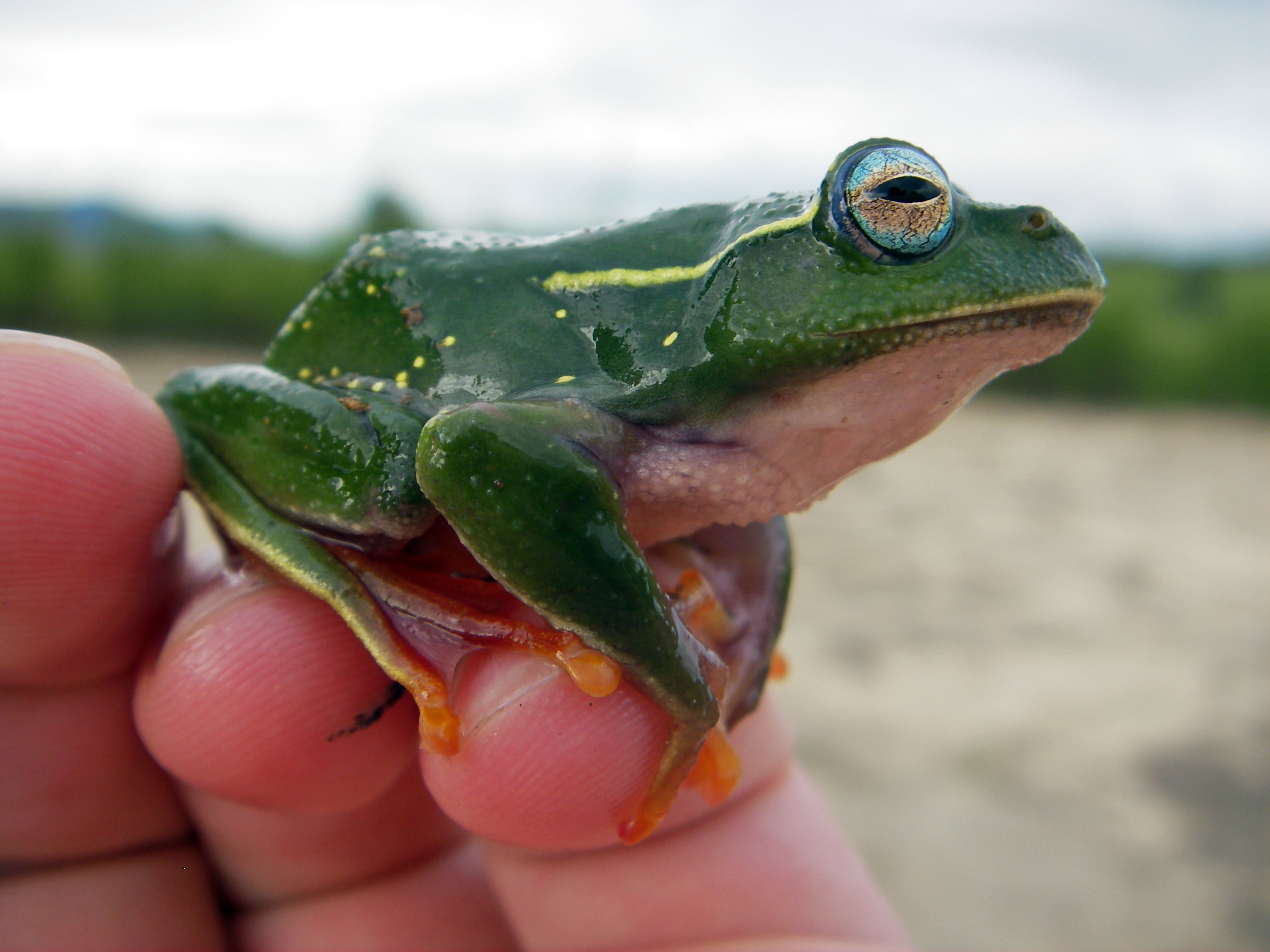
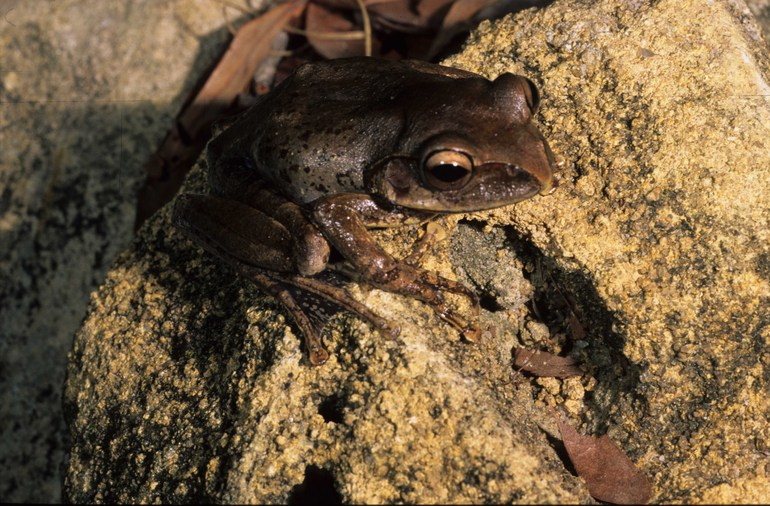
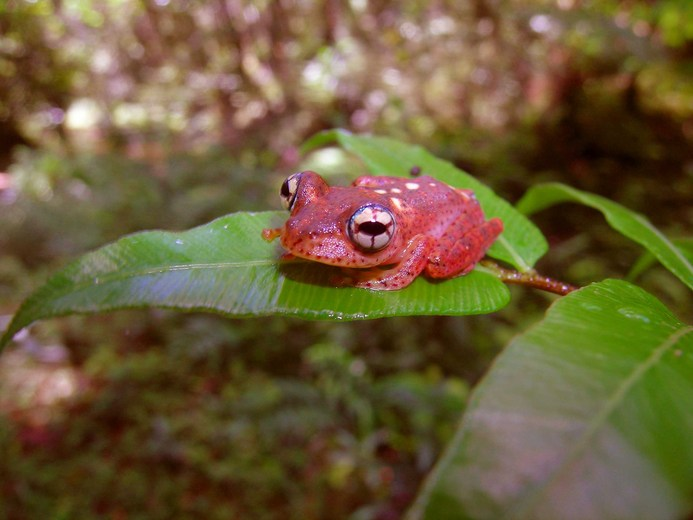
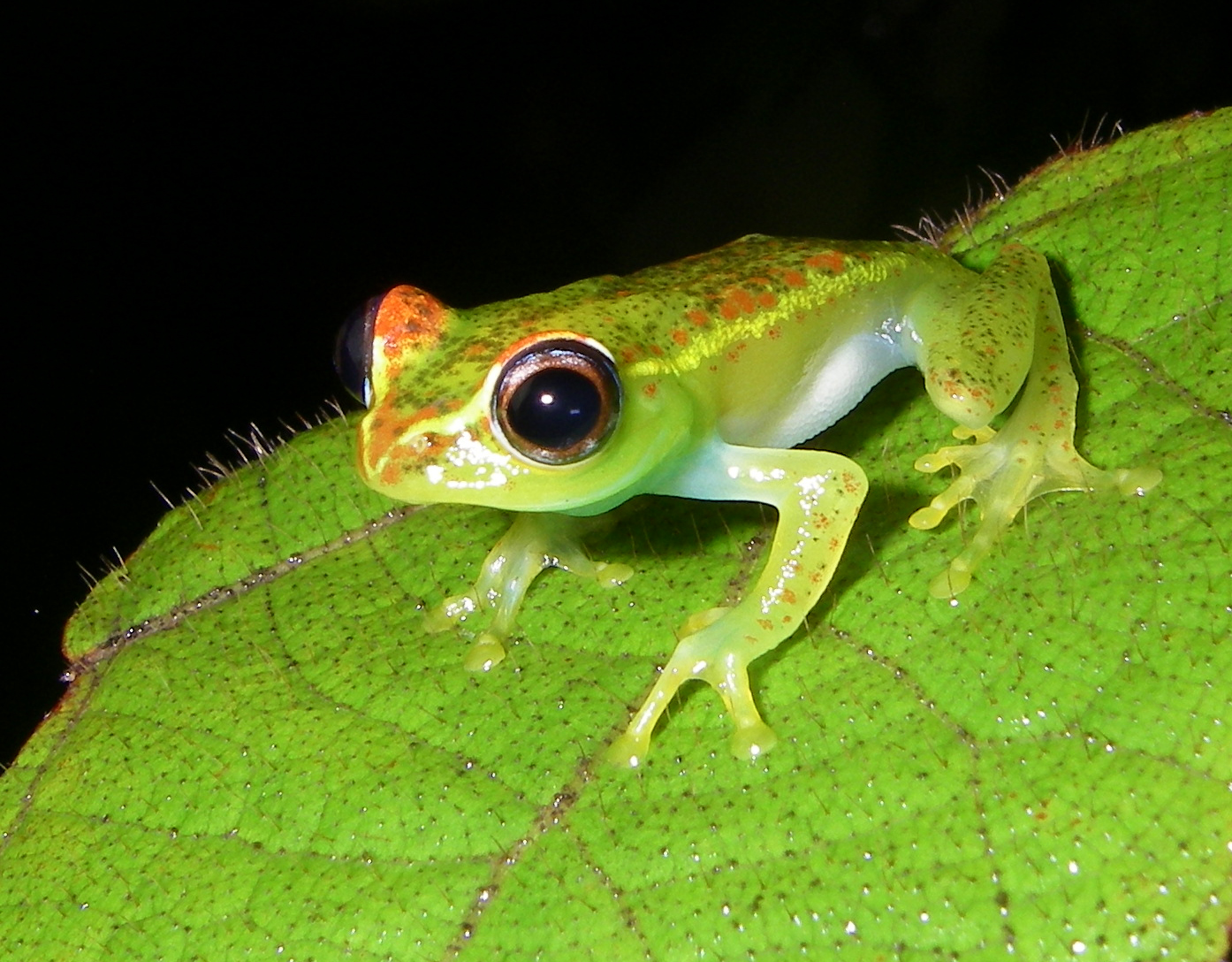
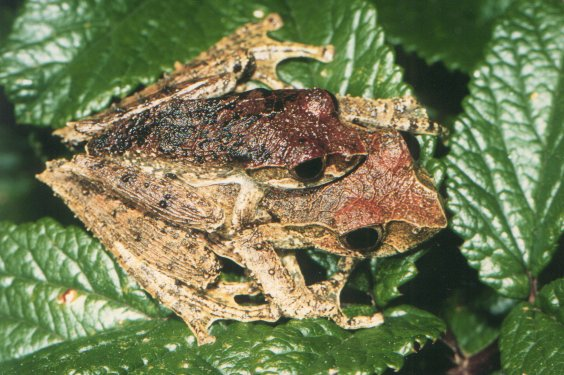
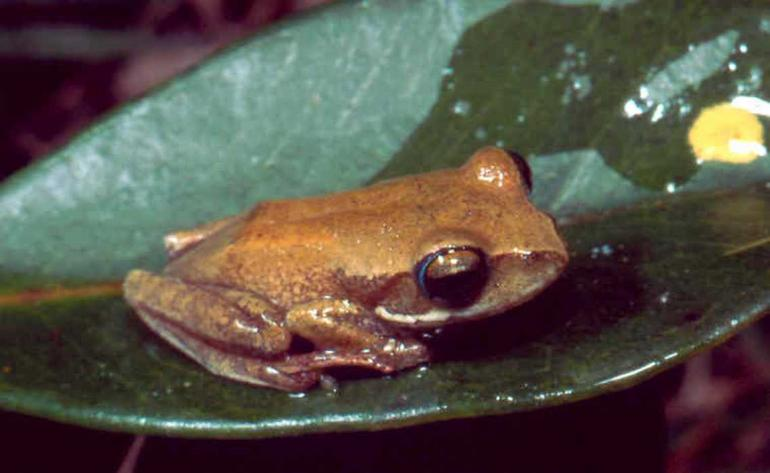
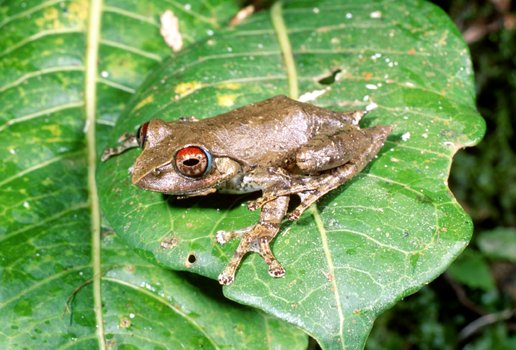
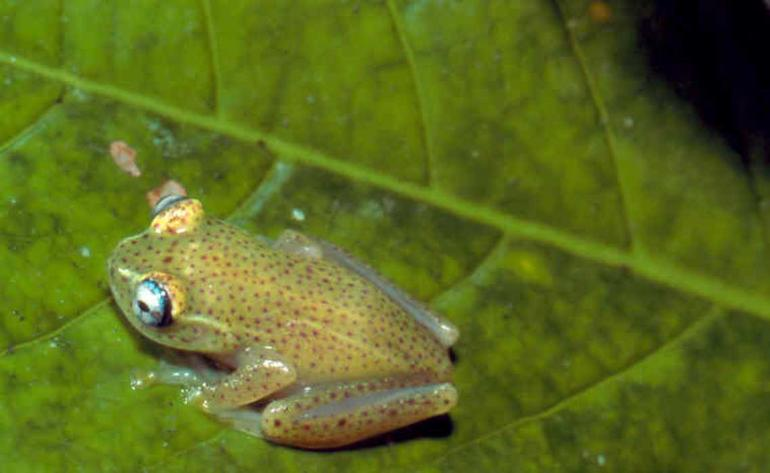
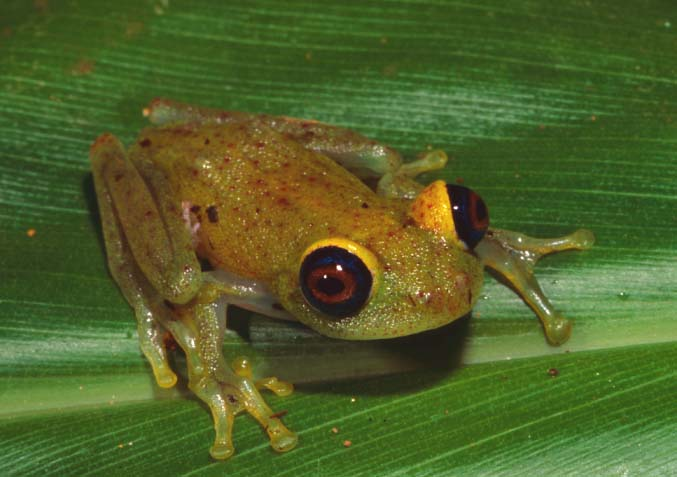
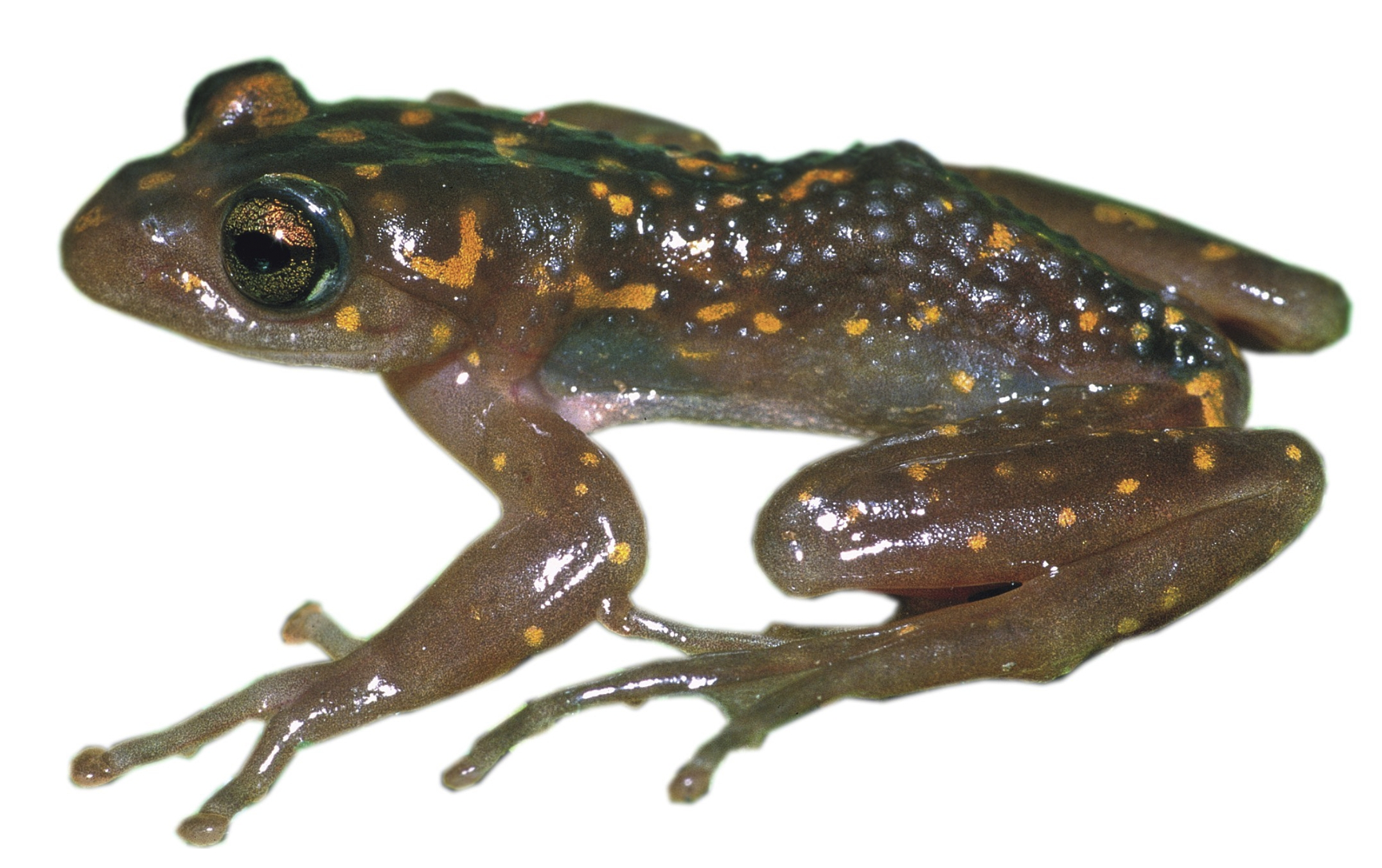
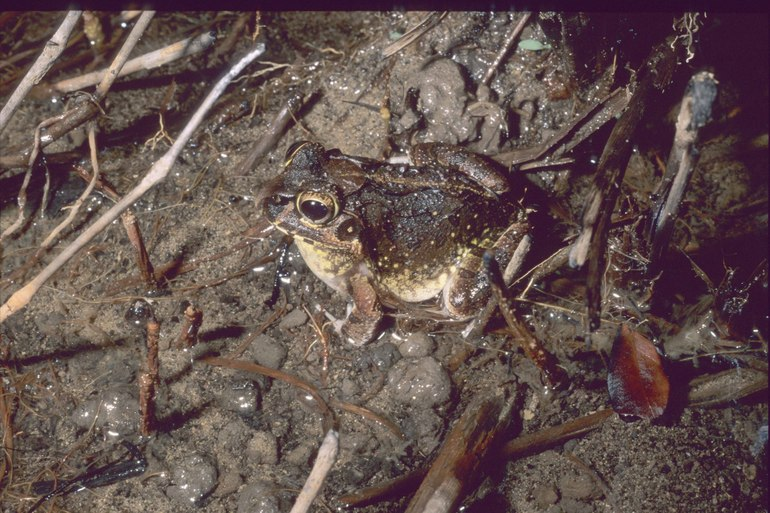
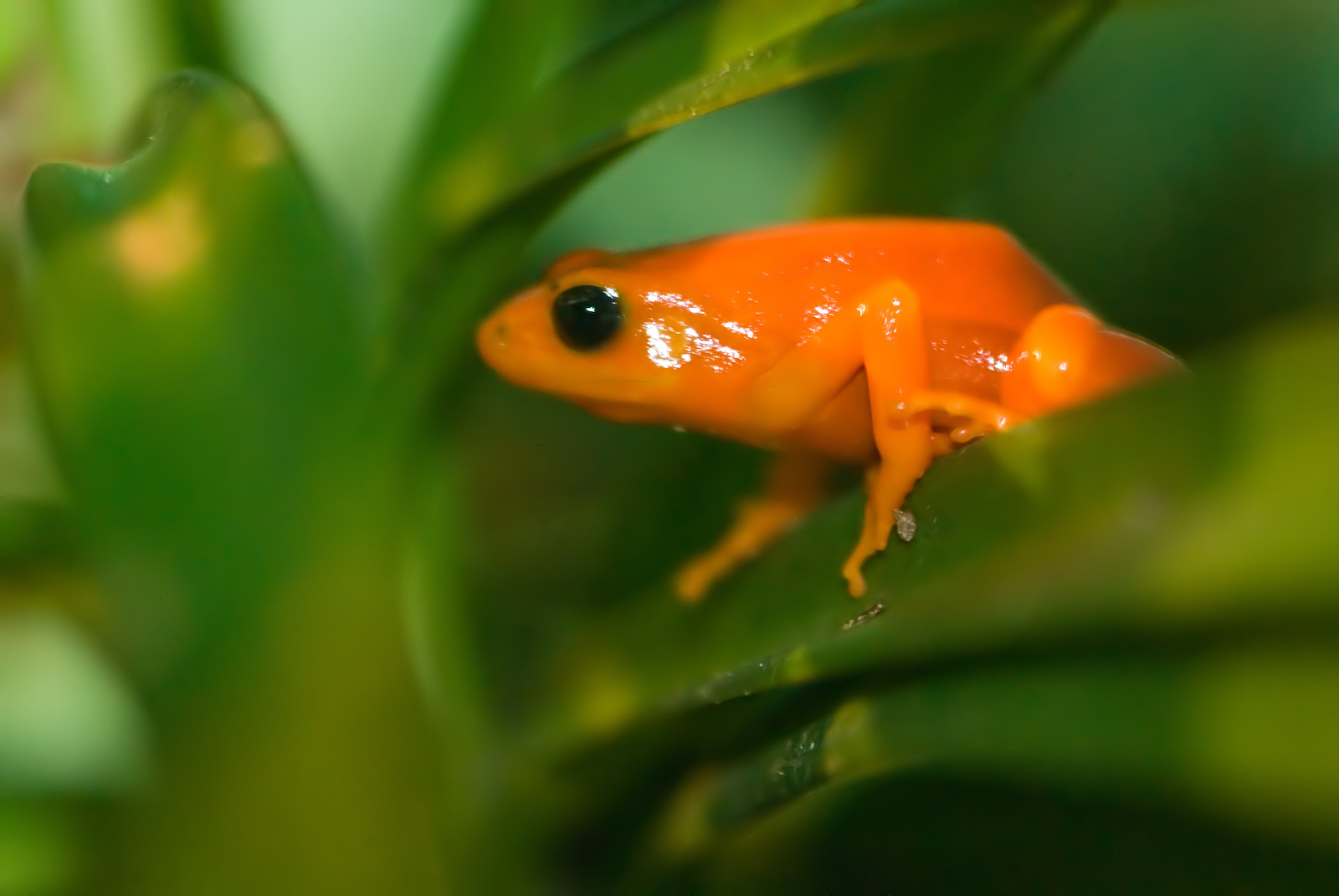
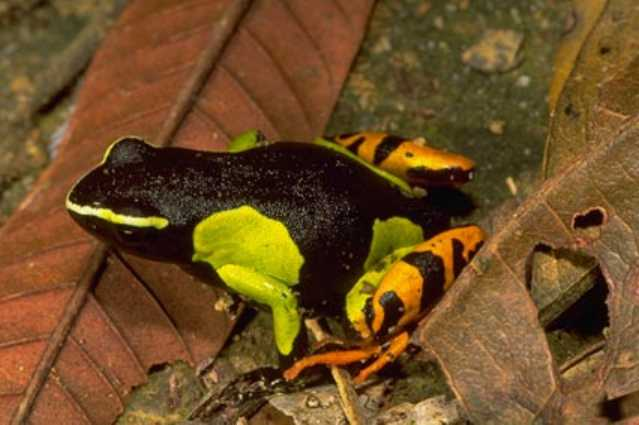
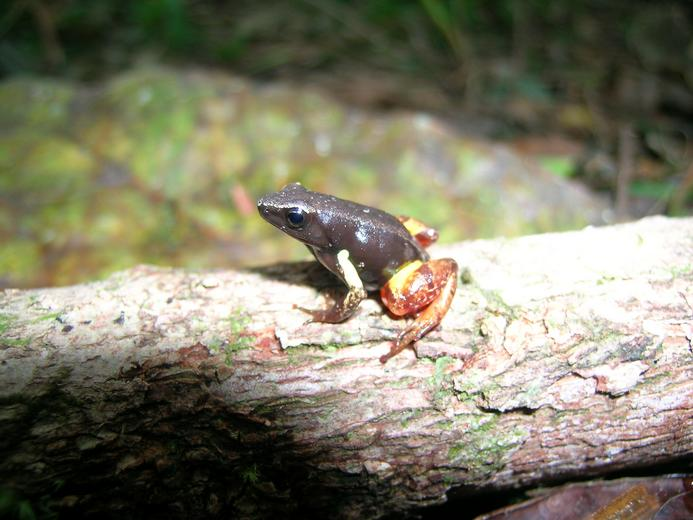
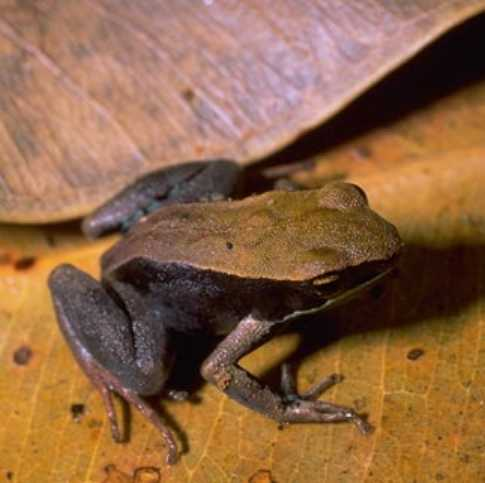
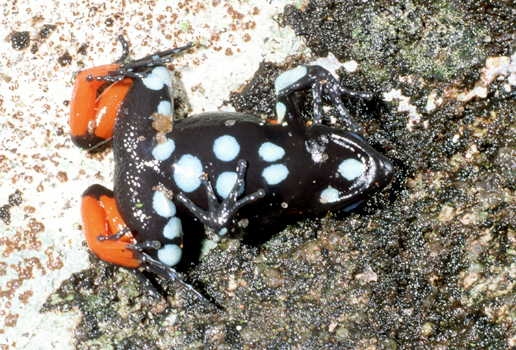
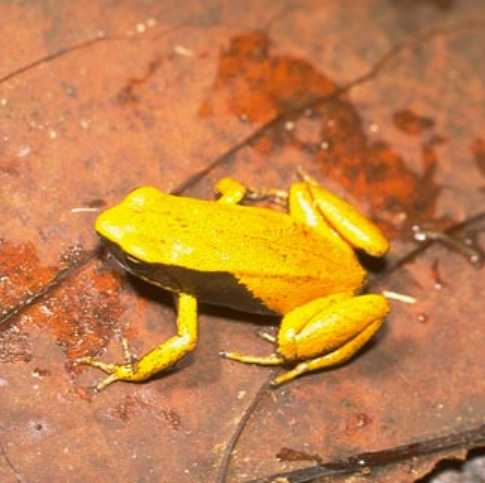
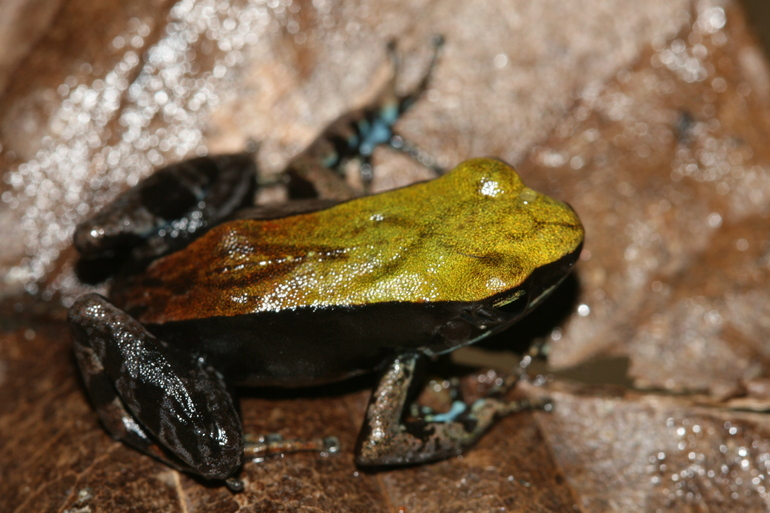
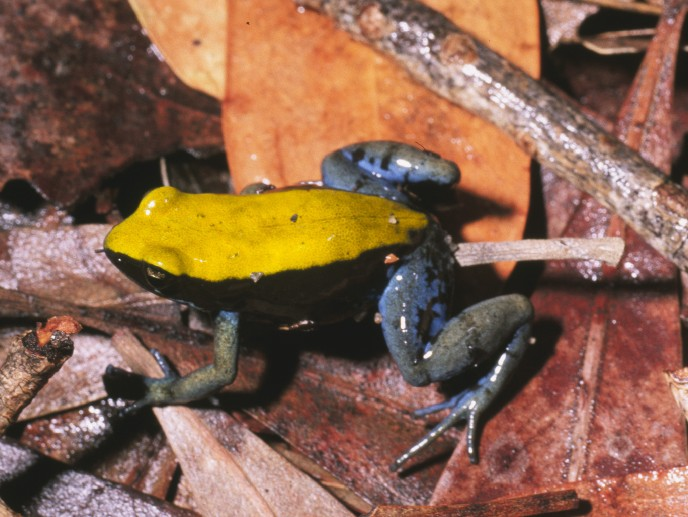
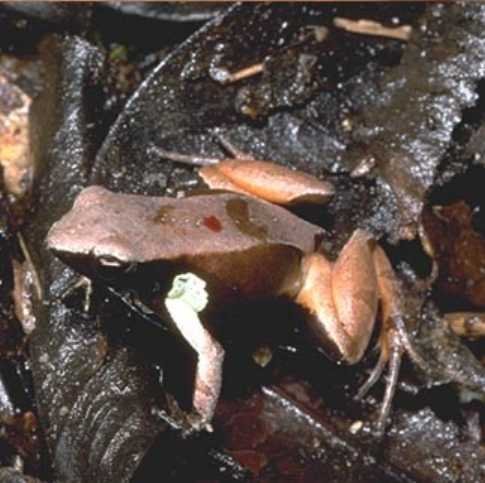
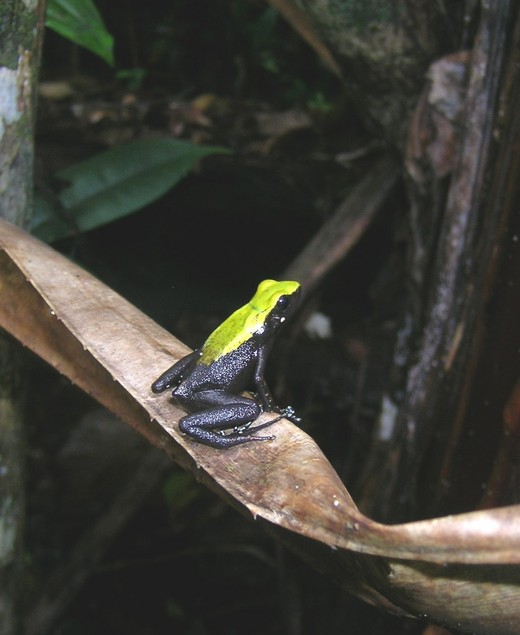
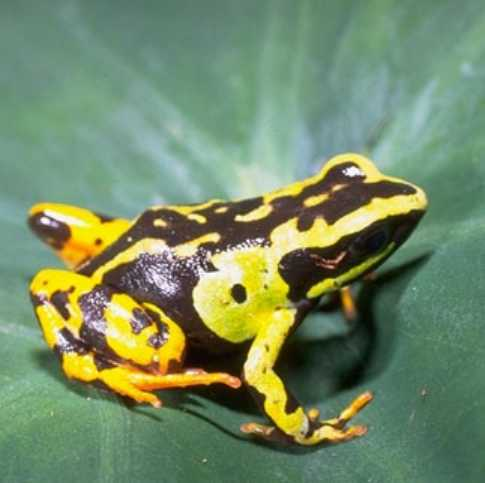
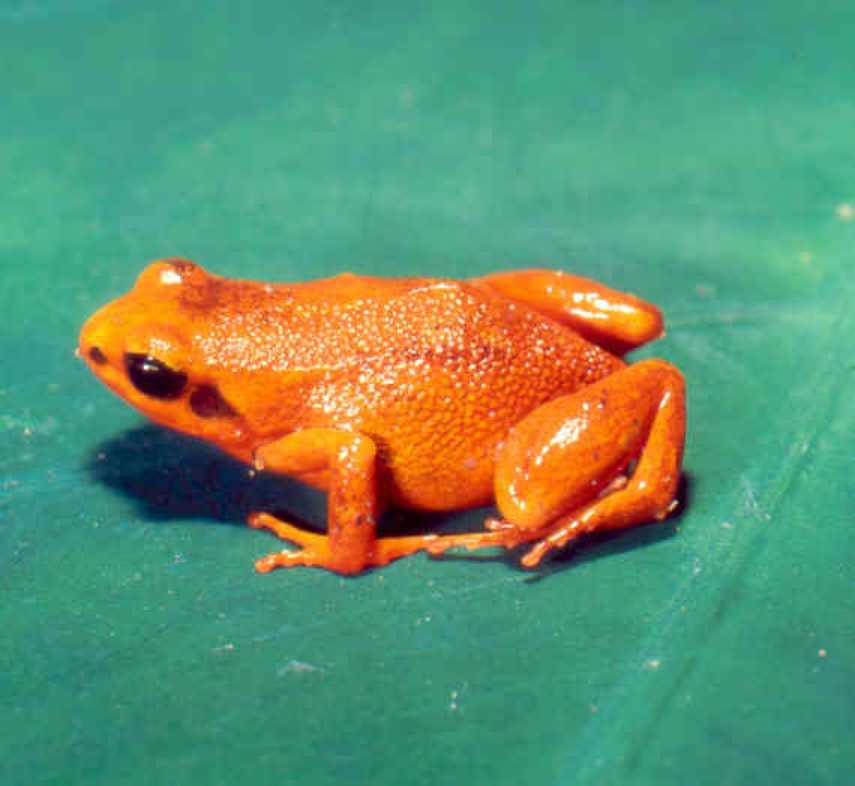
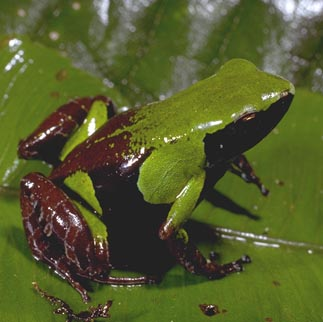
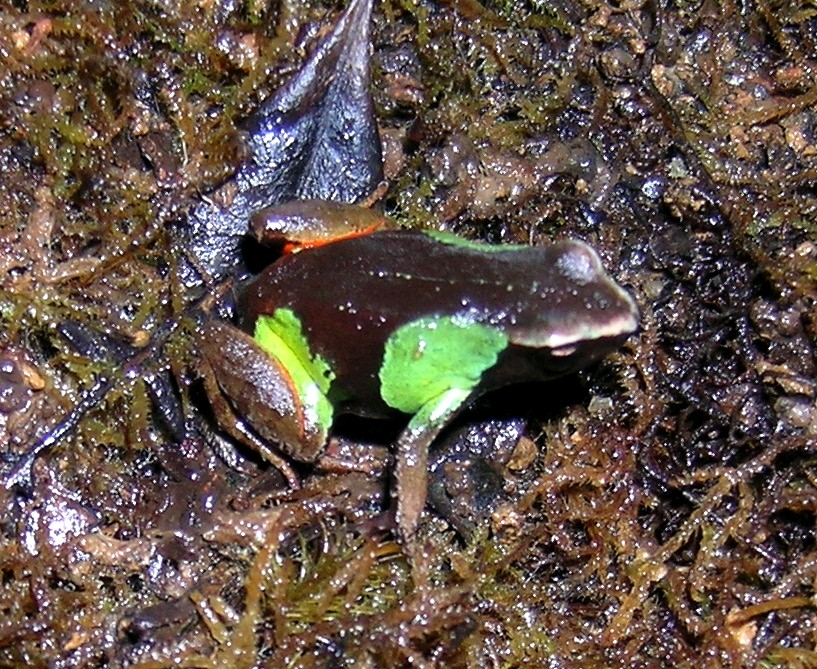
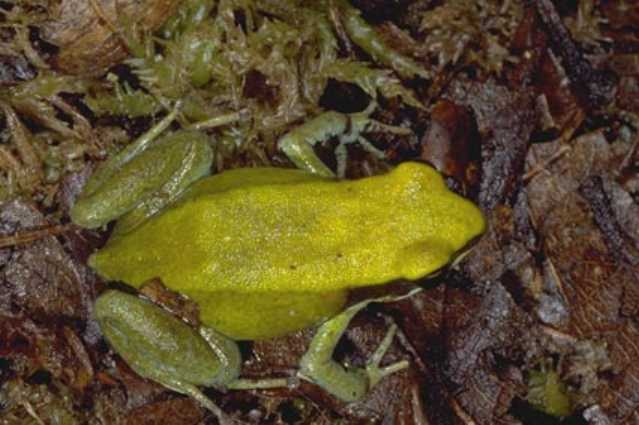
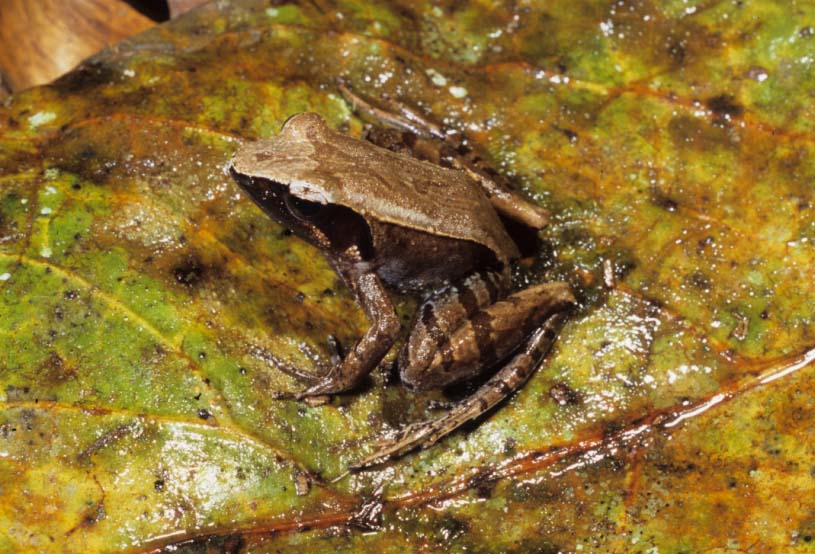
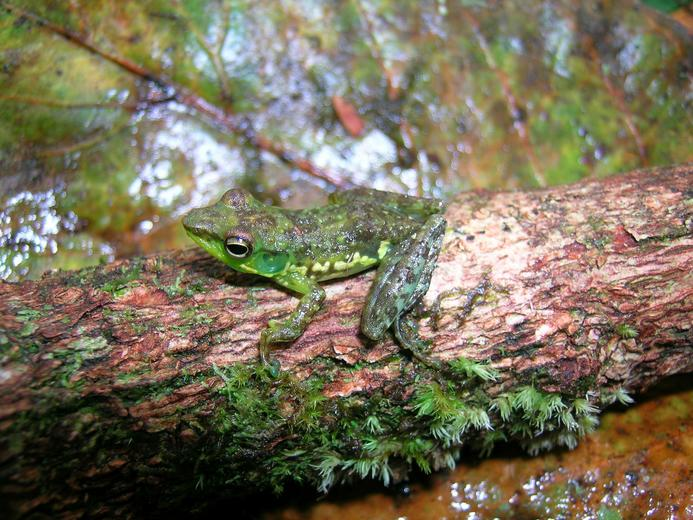
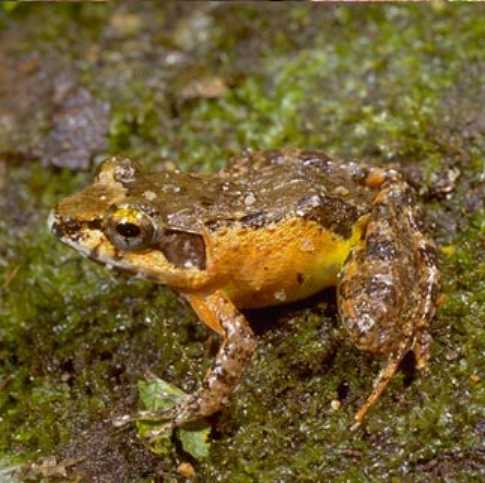
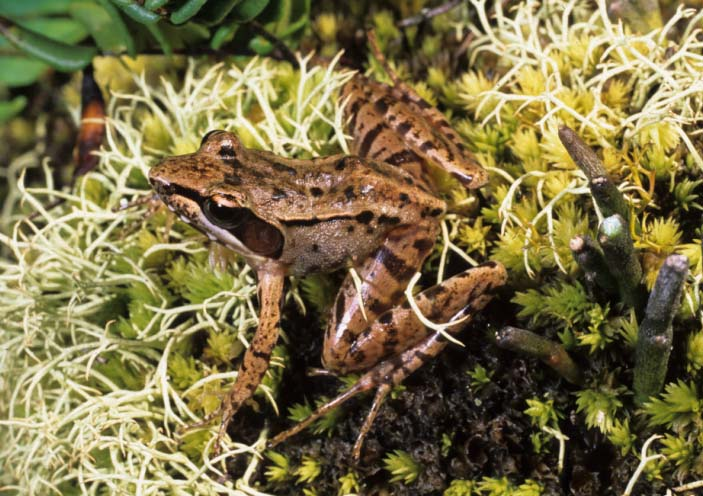
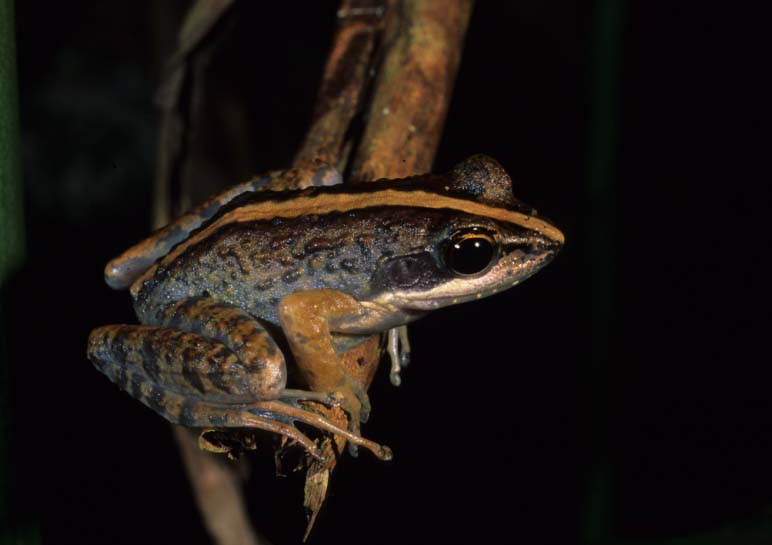
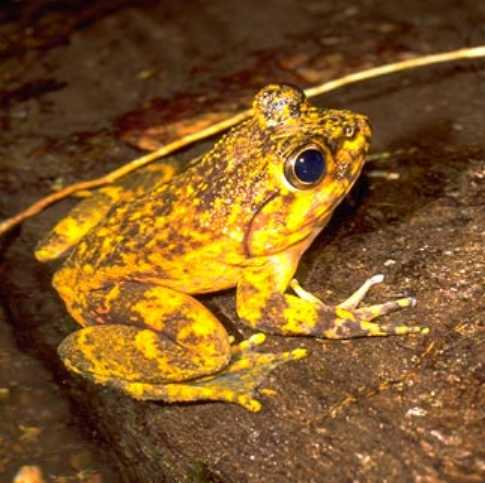
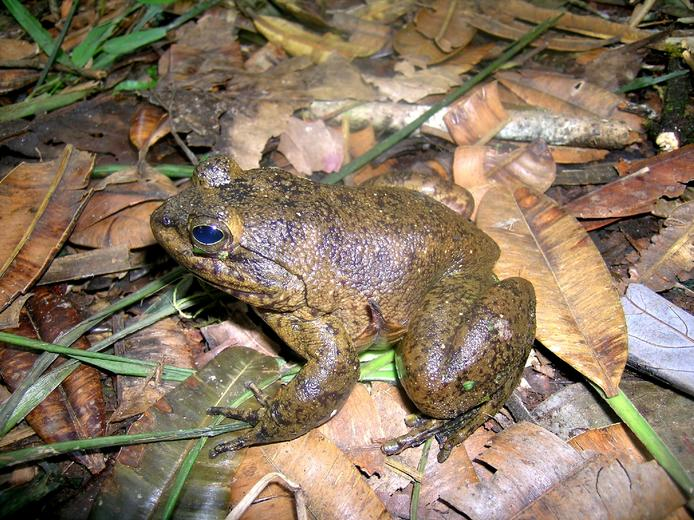
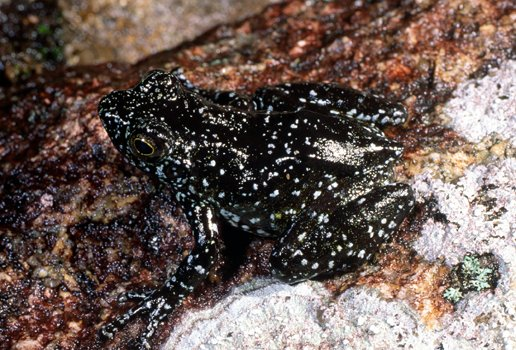
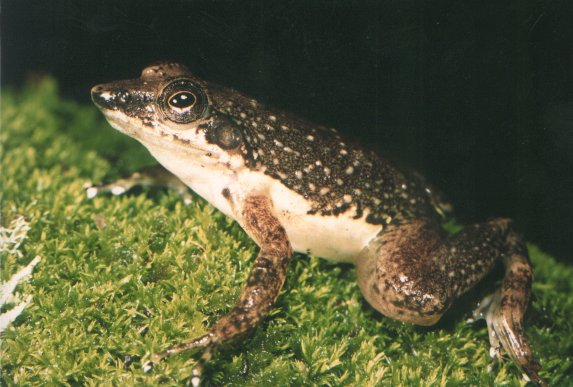
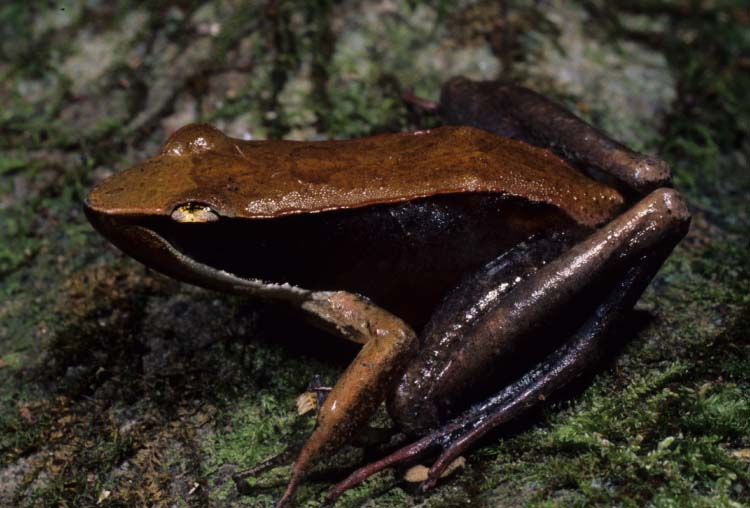
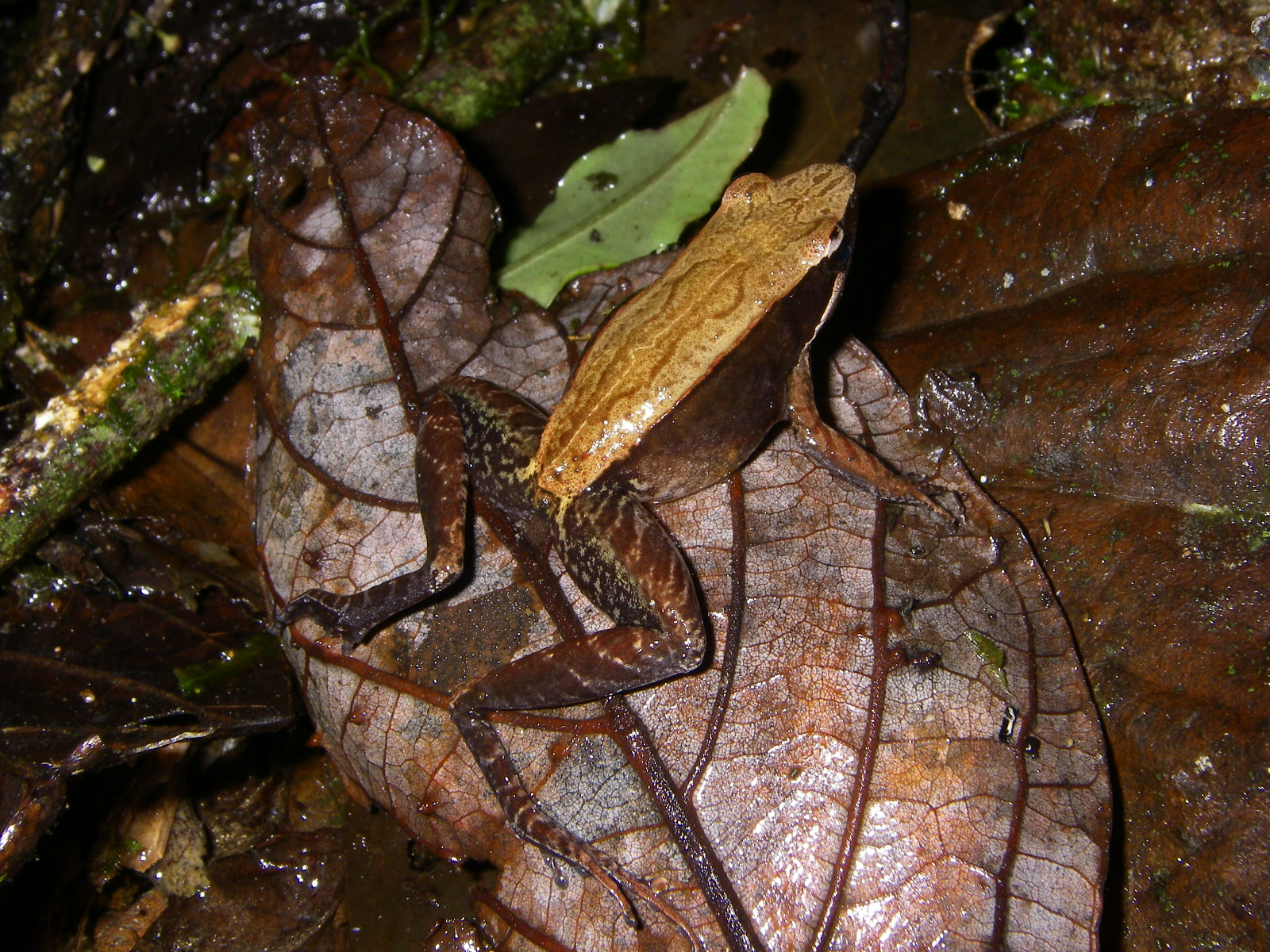
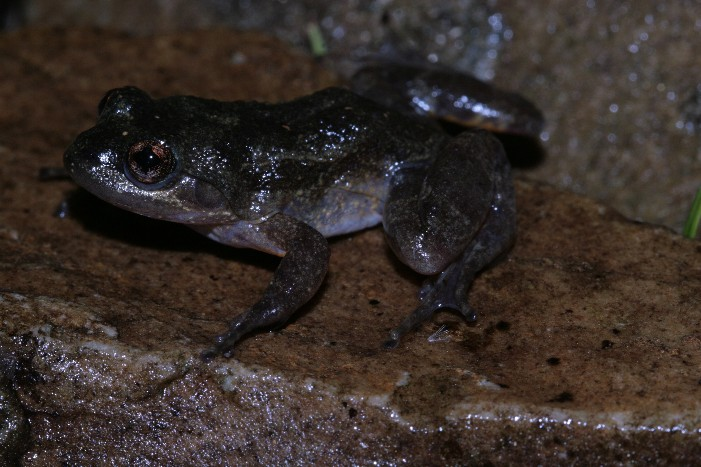
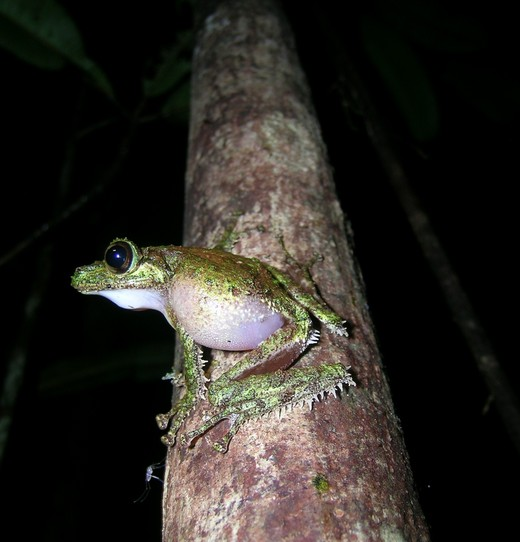
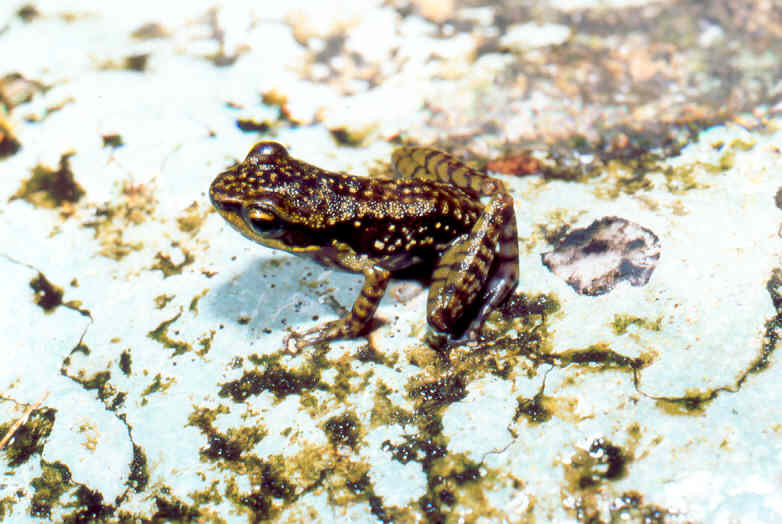
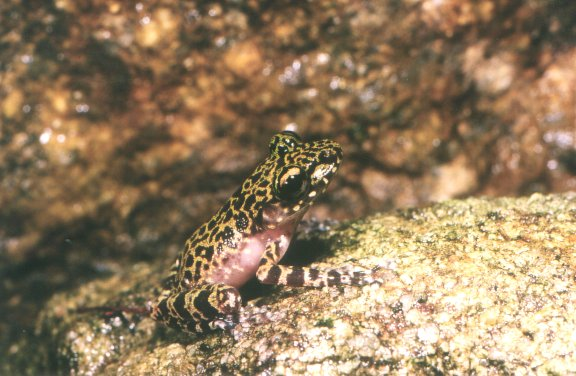
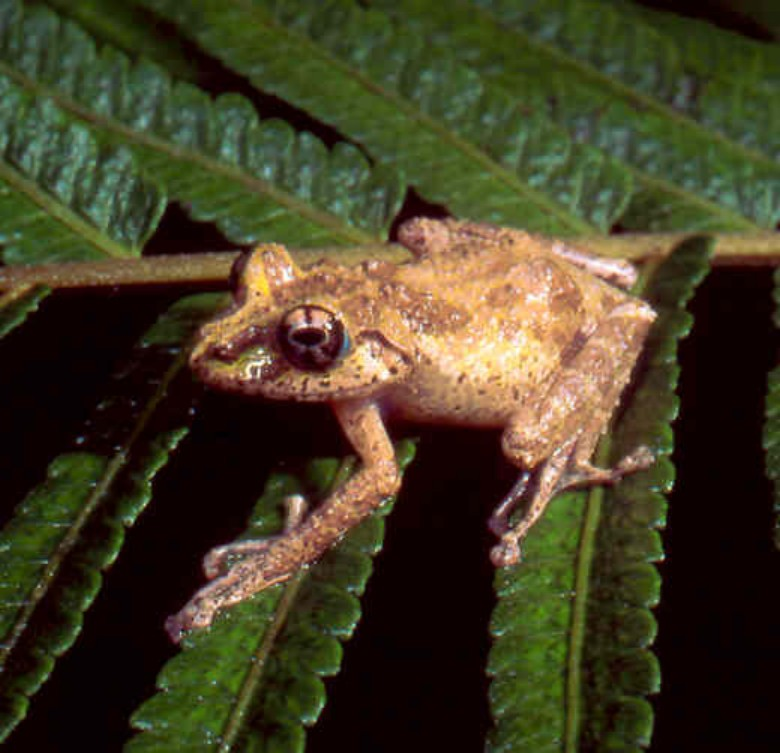
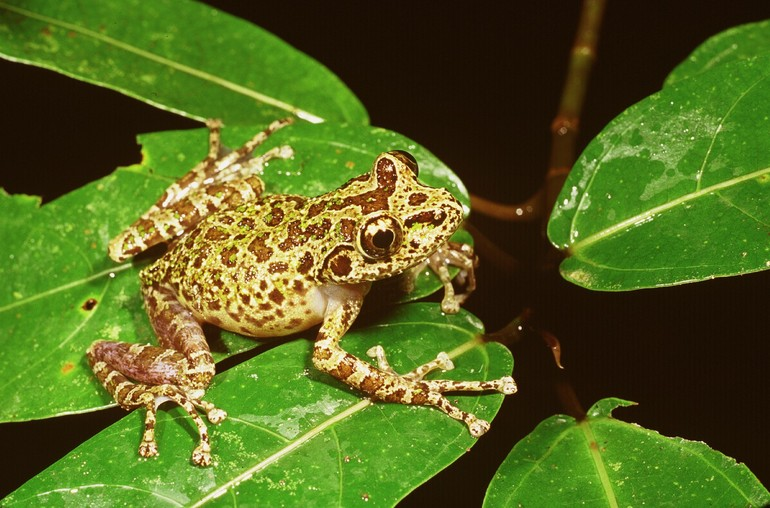
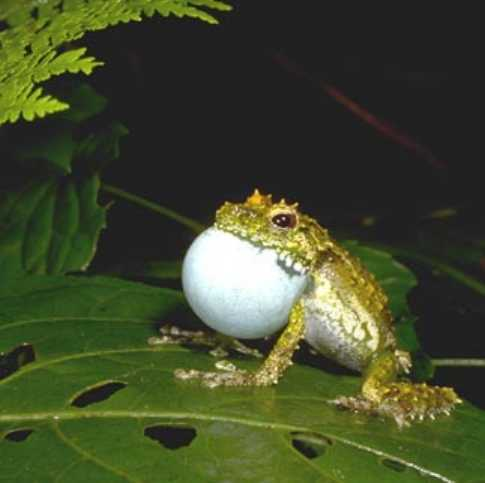
| Species | Status IUCN |
| Aglyptodactylus australis |
| Aglyptodactylus chorus |
| Aglyptodactylus laticeps |
| Aglyptodactylus madagascariensis |
| Aglyptodactylus securifer |
| Blommersia angolafa |
| Blommersia blommersae |
| Blommersia dejongi |
| Blommersia domerguei |
| Blommersia galani |
| Blommersia grandisonae |
| Blommersia kely |
| Blommersia sarotra |
| Blommersia variabilis |
| Blommersia wittei |
| Boehmantis microtympanum |
| Boophis albilabris |
| Boophis albipunctatus |
| Boophis andohahela |
| Boophis andrangoloaka |
| Boophis andreonei |
| Boophis anjanaharibeensis |
| Boophis ankaratra |
| Boophis arcanus |
| Boophis axelmeyeri |
| Boophis baetkei |
| Boophis blommersae |
| Boophis boehmei |
| Boophis boppa |
| Boophis bottae |
| Boophis brachychir |
| Boophis burgeri |
| Boophis calcaratus |
| Boophis doulioti |
| Boophis elenae |
| Boophis englaenderi |
| Boophis entingae |
| Boophis erythrodactylus |
| Boophis fayi |
| Boophis feonnyala |
| Boophis goudotii |
| Boophis guibei |
| Boophis haematopus |
| Boophis haingana |
| Boophis idae |
| Boophis jaegeri |
| Boophis laurenti |
| Boophis liami |
| Boophis lichenoides |
| Boophis lilianae |
| Boophis luciae |
| Boophis luteus |
| Boophis madagascariensis |
| Boophis majori |
| Boophis mandraka |
| Boophis marojezensis |
| Boophis miadana |
| Boophis microtympanum |
| Boophis miniatus |
| Boophis narinsi |
| Boophis obscurus |
| Boophis occidentalis |
| Boophis opisthodon |
| Boophis pauliani |
| Boophis periegetes |
| Boophis picturatus |
| Boophis piperatus |
| Boophis popi |
| Boophis praedictus |
| Boophis pyrrhus |
| Boophis quasiboehmei |
| Boophis rappiodes |
| Boophis reticulatus |
| Boophis rhodoscelis |
| Boophis roseipalmatus |
| Boophis rufioculis |
| Boophis sambirano |
| Boophis sandrae |
| Boophis schuboeae |
| Boophis septentrionalis |
| Boophis sibilans |
| Boophis solomaso |
| Boophis spinophis |
| Boophis tampoka |
| Boophis tasymena |
| Boophis tephraeomystax |
| Boophis tsilomaro |
| Boophis ulftunni |
| Boophis viridis |
| Boophis vittatus |
| Boophis williamsi |
| Boophis xerophilus |
| Laliostoma labrosum |
| Mantella aurantiaca (Golden Mantella) |
| Mantella baroni |
| Mantella bernhardi |
| Mantella betsileo |
| Mantella cowanii |
| Mantella crocea |
| Mantella ebenaui |
| Mantella expectata |
| Mantella haraldmeieri |
| Mantella laevigata |
| Mantella madagascariensis |
| Mantella manery (Marojejy Mantella) |
| Mantella milotympanum |
| Mantella nigricans |
| Mantella pulchra |
| Mantella viridis |
| Mantidactylus aerumnalis |
| Mantidactylus albofrenatus |
| Mantidactylus alutus |
| Mantidactylus ambohimitombi |
| Mantidactylus ambreensis |
| Mantidactylus argenteus |
| Mantidactylus bellyi |
| Mantidactylus betsileanus |
| Mantidactylus biporus |
| Mantidactylus bourgati |
| Mantidactylus brevipalmatus |
| Mantidactylus charlotteae |
| Mantidactylus cowanii |
| Mantidactylus curtus |
| Mantidactylus delormei |
| Mantidactylus femoralis |
| Mantidactylus grandidieri |
| Mantidactylus guttulatus |
| Mantidactylus lugubris |
| Mantidactylus madecassus |
| Mantidactylus majori |
| Mantidactylus melanopleura |
| Mantidactylus mocquardi |
| Mantidactylus noralottae |
| Mantidactylus opiparis |
| Mantidactylus paidroa |
| Mantidactylus pauliani |
| Mantidactylus tricinctus |
| Mantidactylus ulcerosus |
| Mantidactylus zipperi |
| Mantidactylus zolitschka |
| Spinomantis aglavei |
| Spinomantis bertini |
| Spinomantis brunae |
| Spinomantis elegans |
| Spinomantis fimbriatus |
| Spinomantis guibei |
| Spinomantis massorum |
| Spinomantis microtis |
| Spinomantis nussbaumi |
| Spinomantis peraccae |
| Spinomantis phantasticus |
| Spinomantis tavaratra |
| Wakea madinika |

== Microhylidae ==
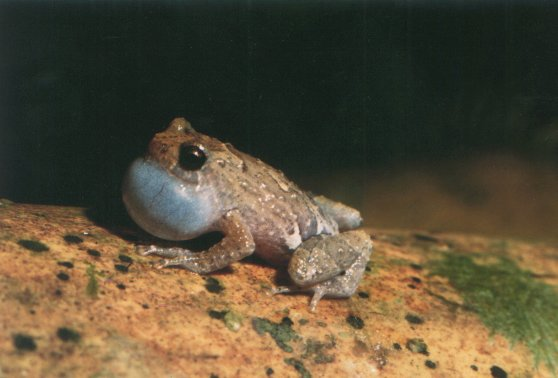
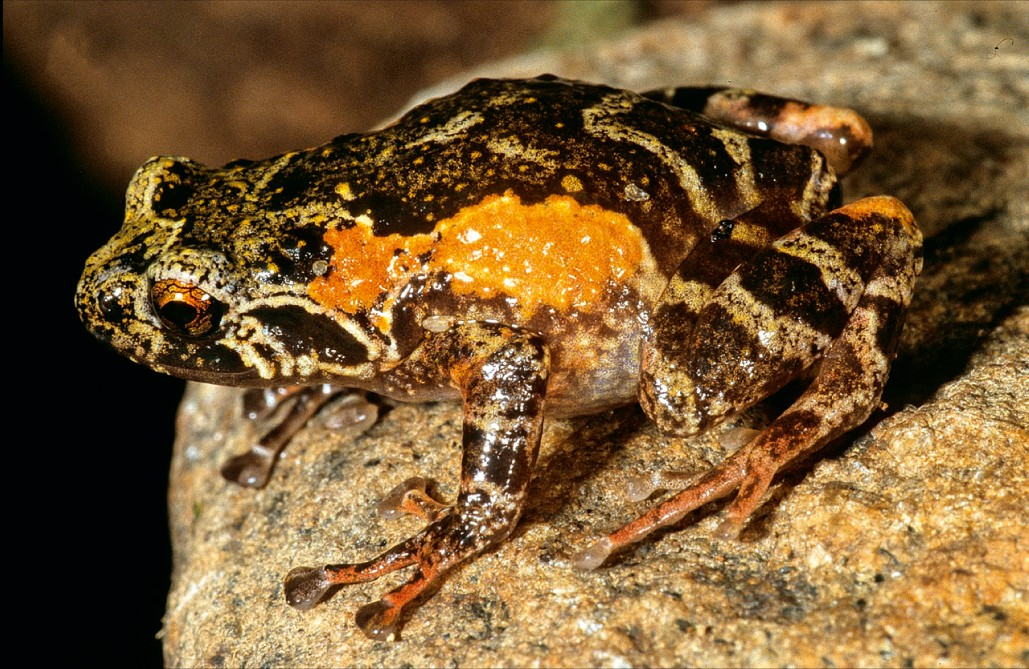
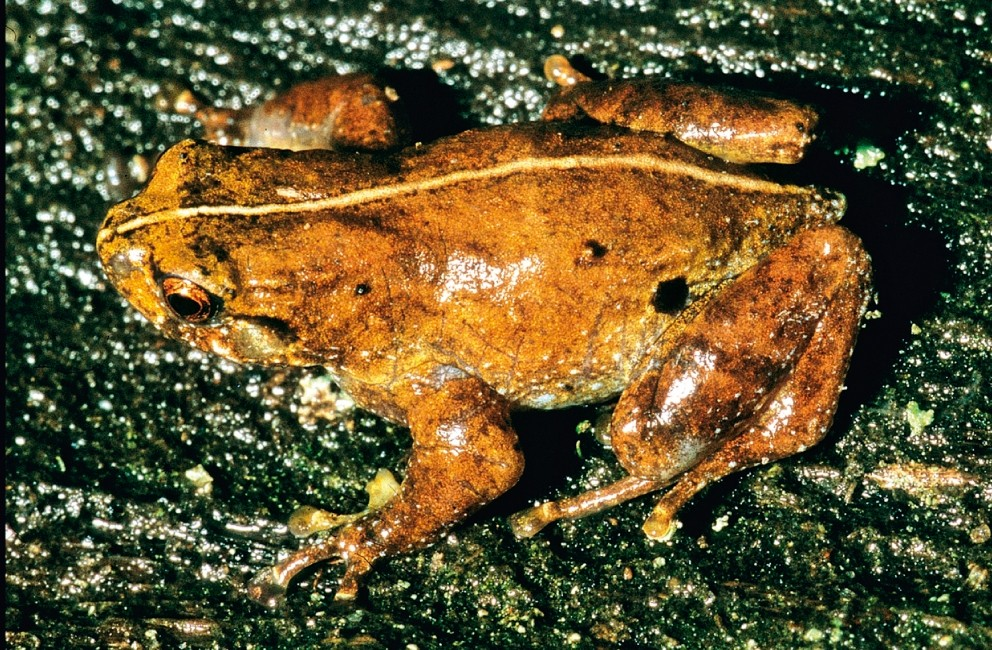
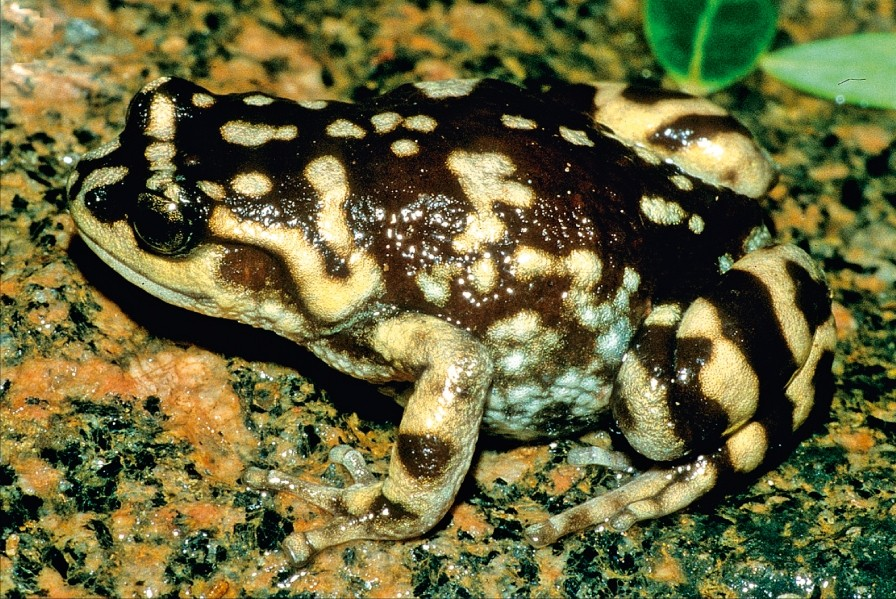
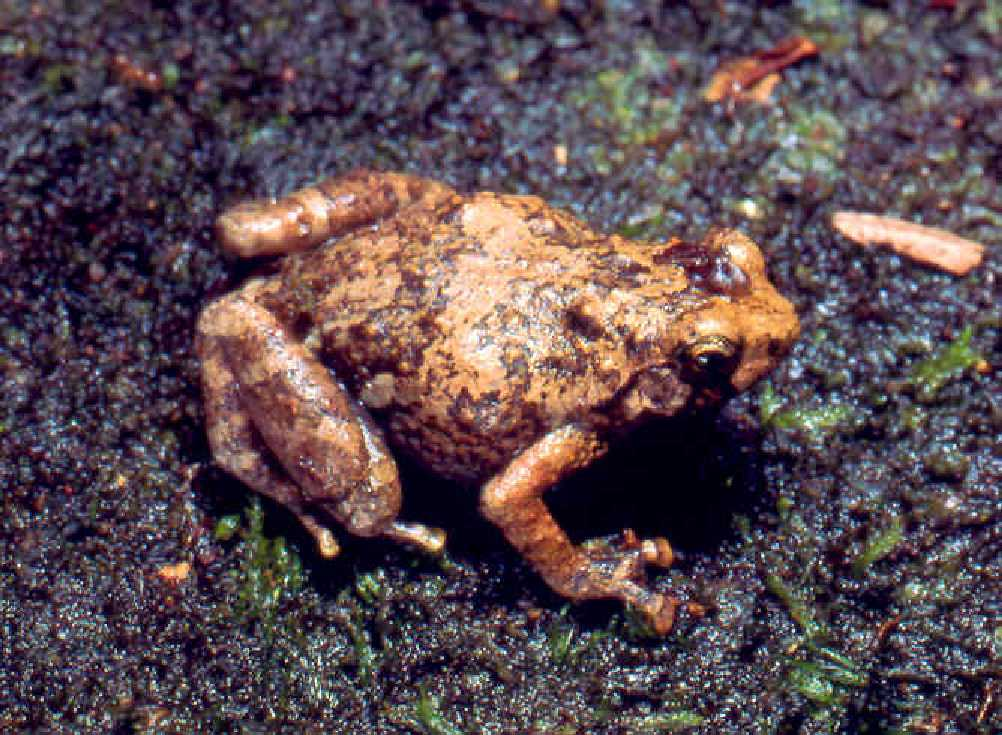
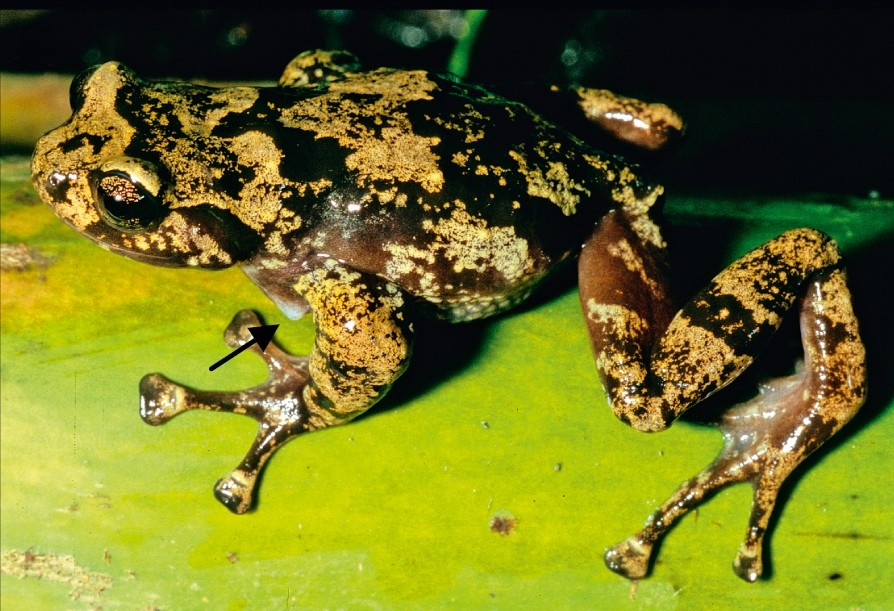
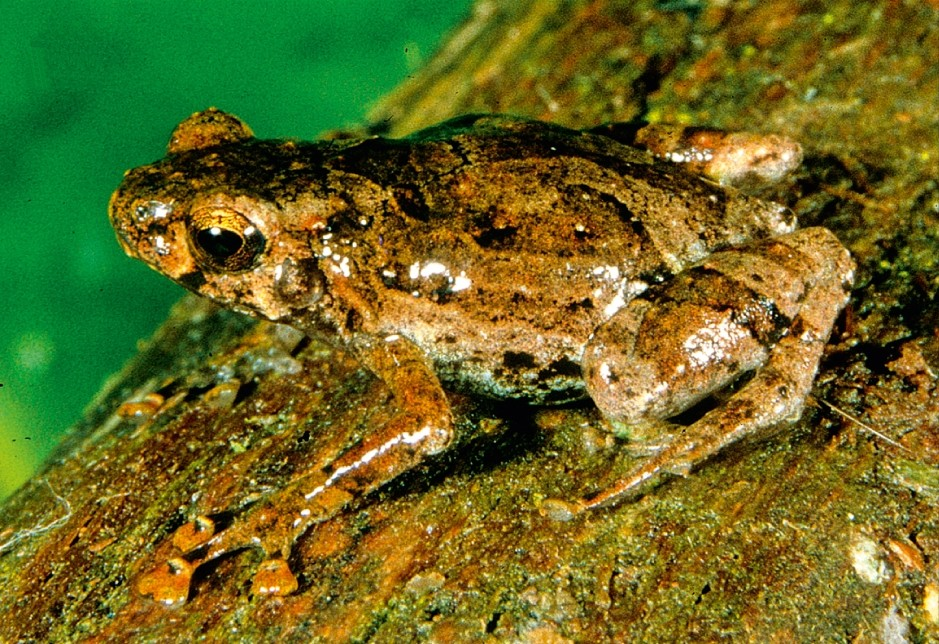
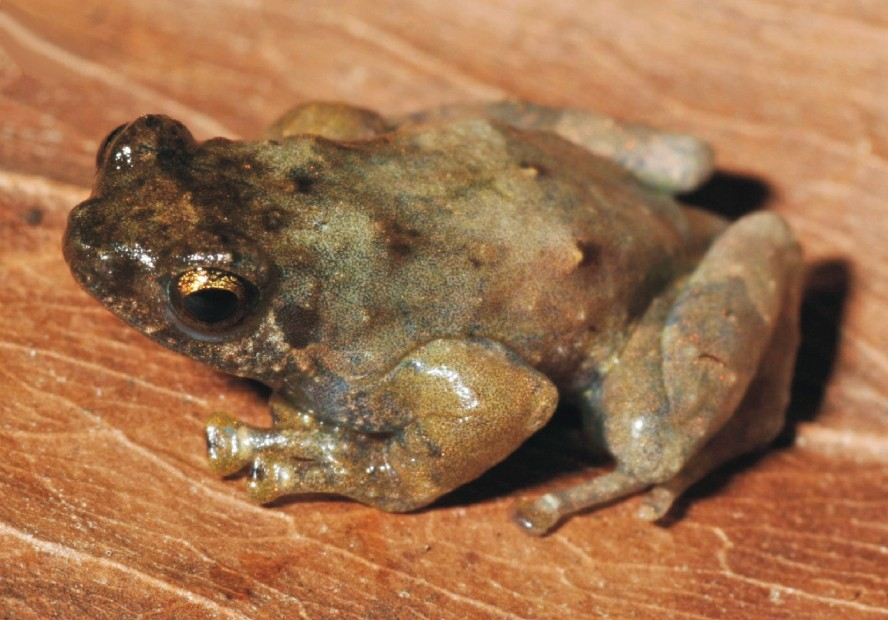
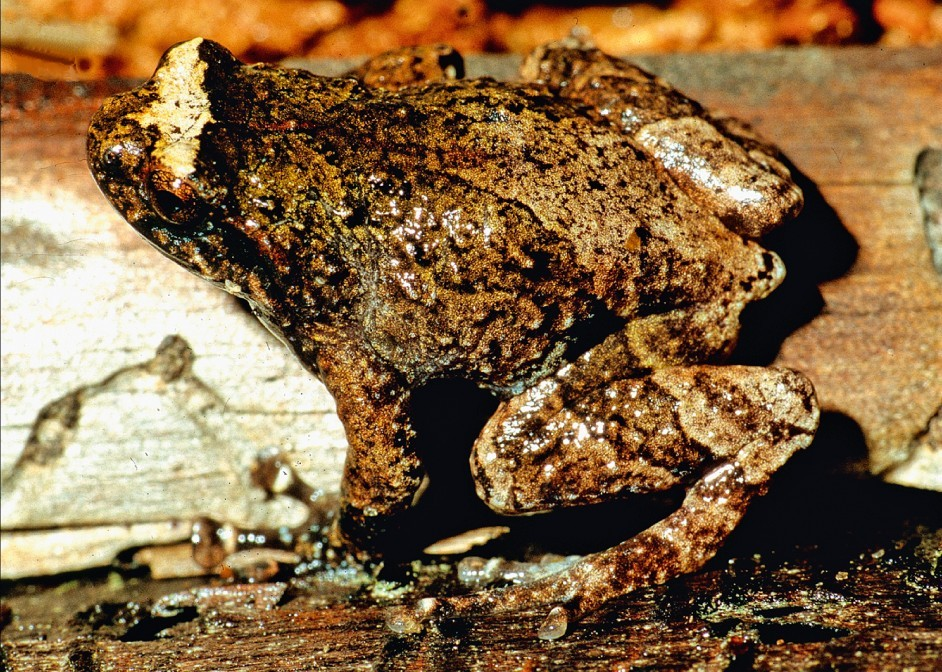
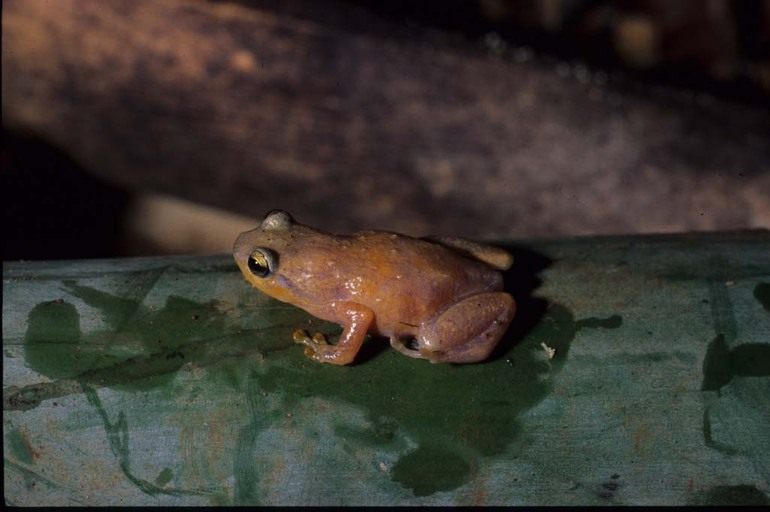
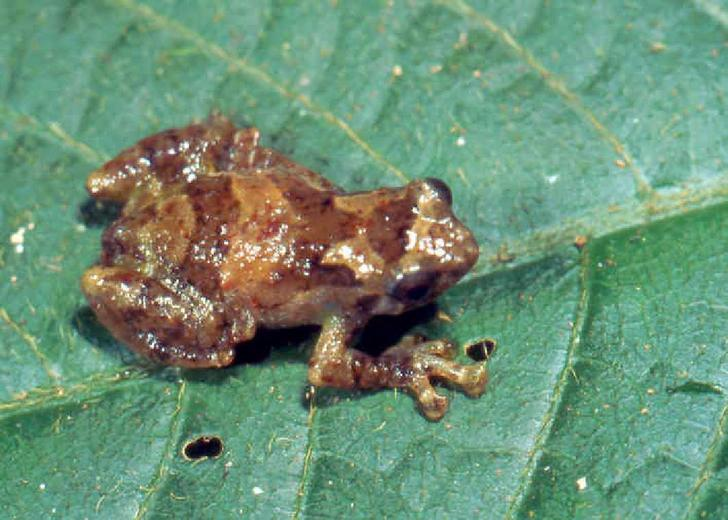
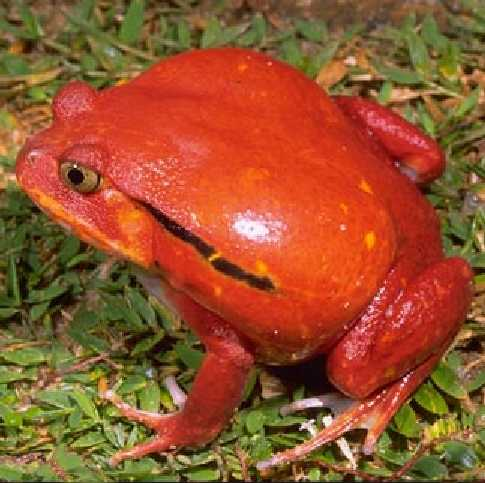
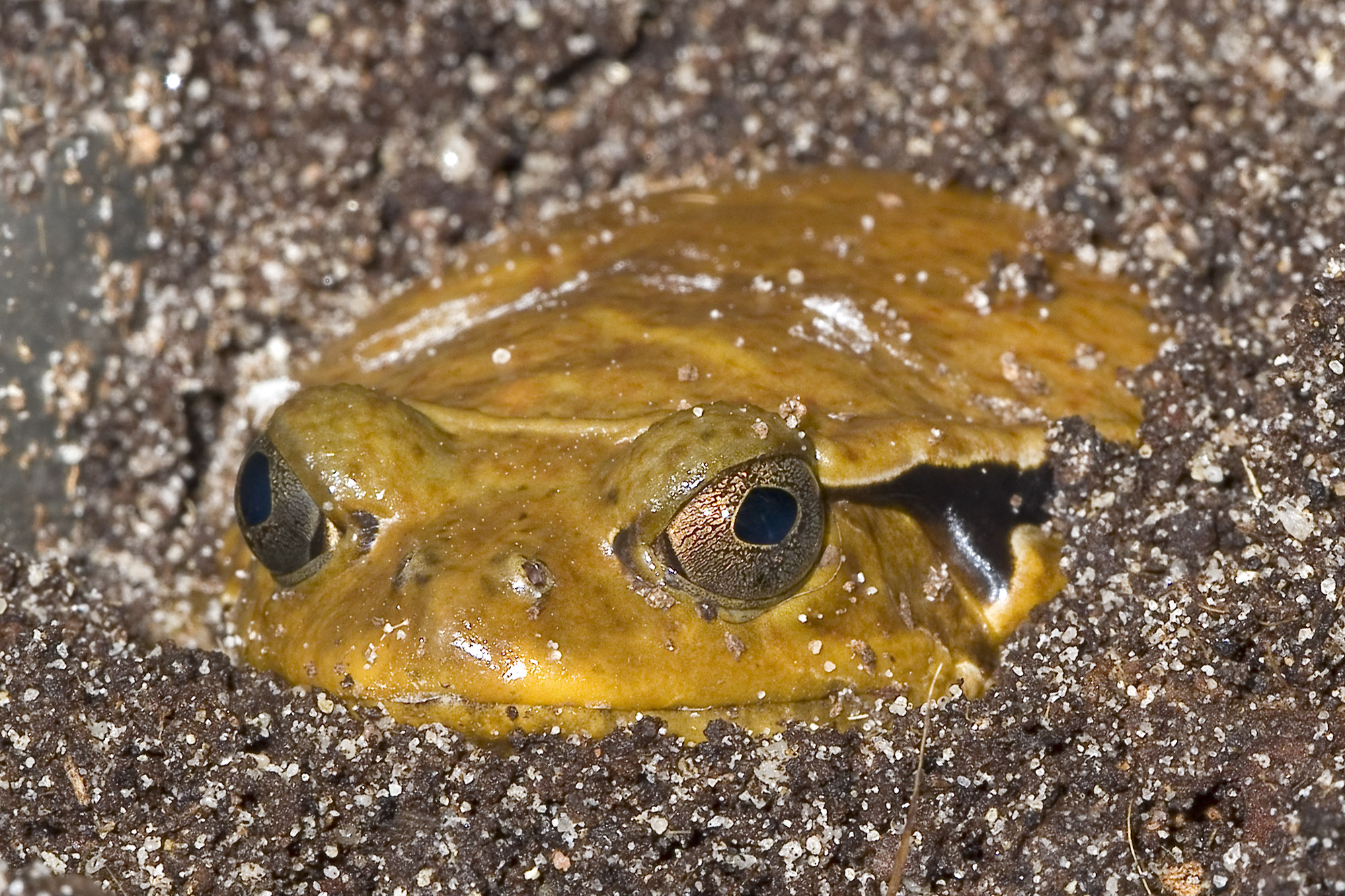
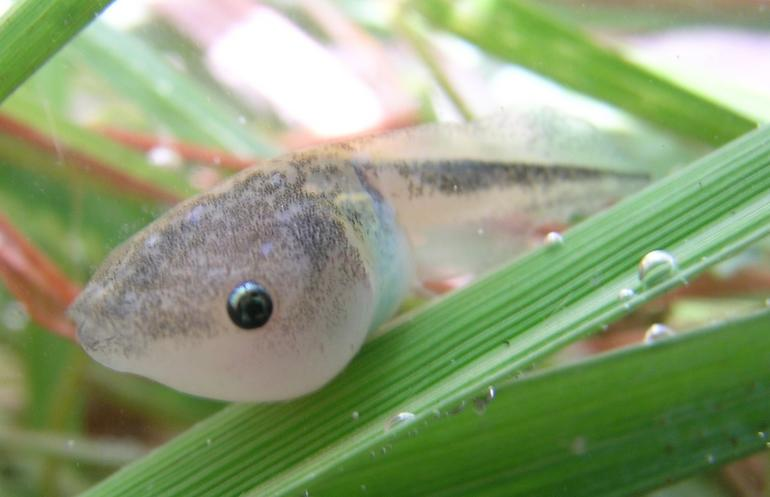
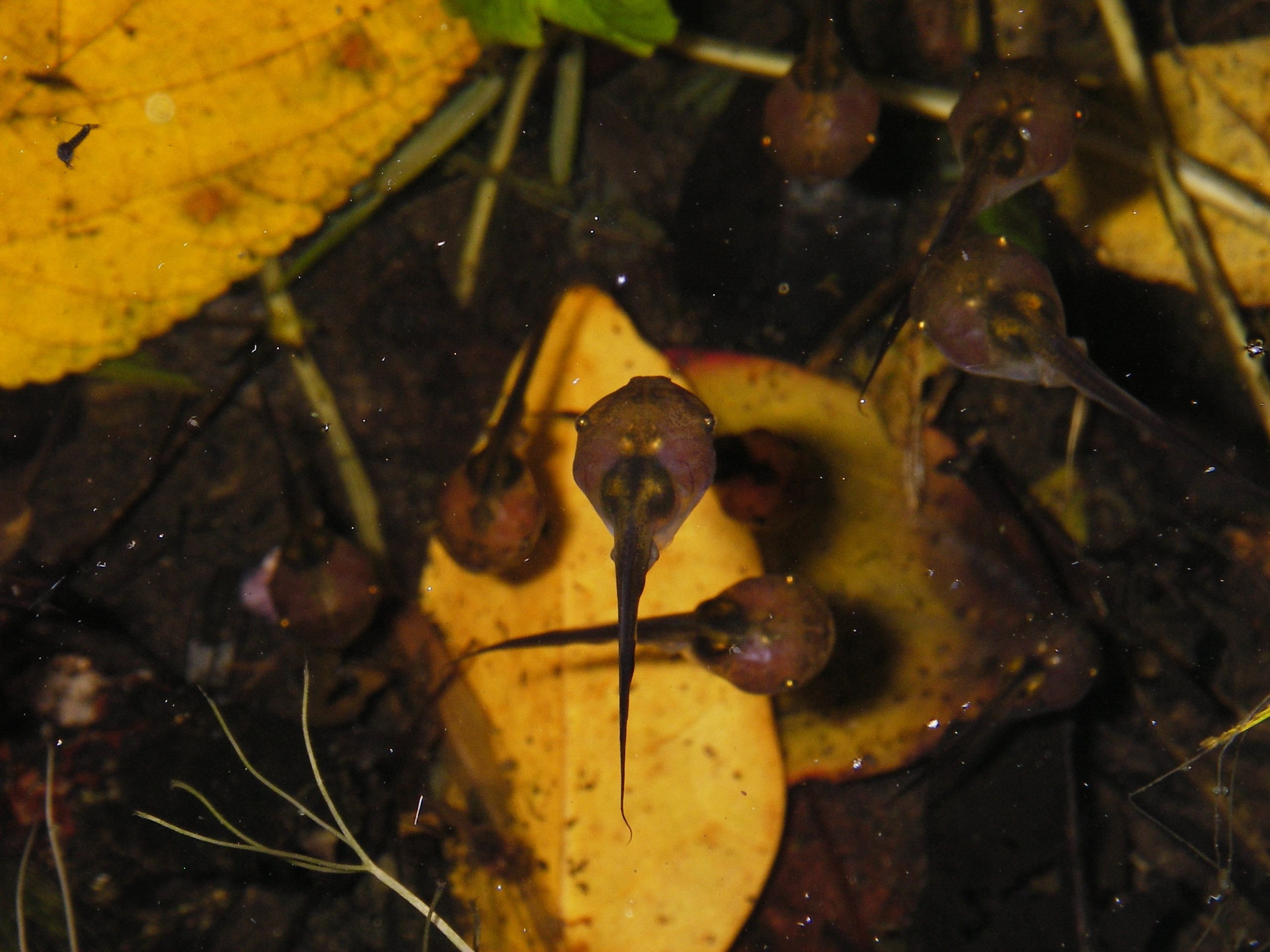
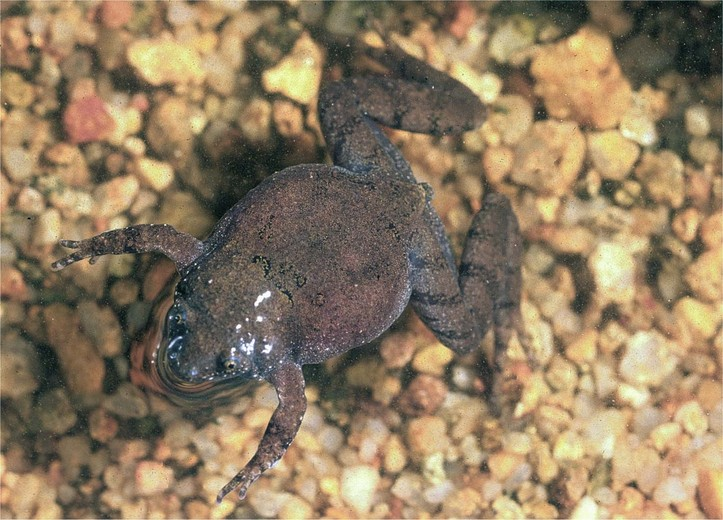
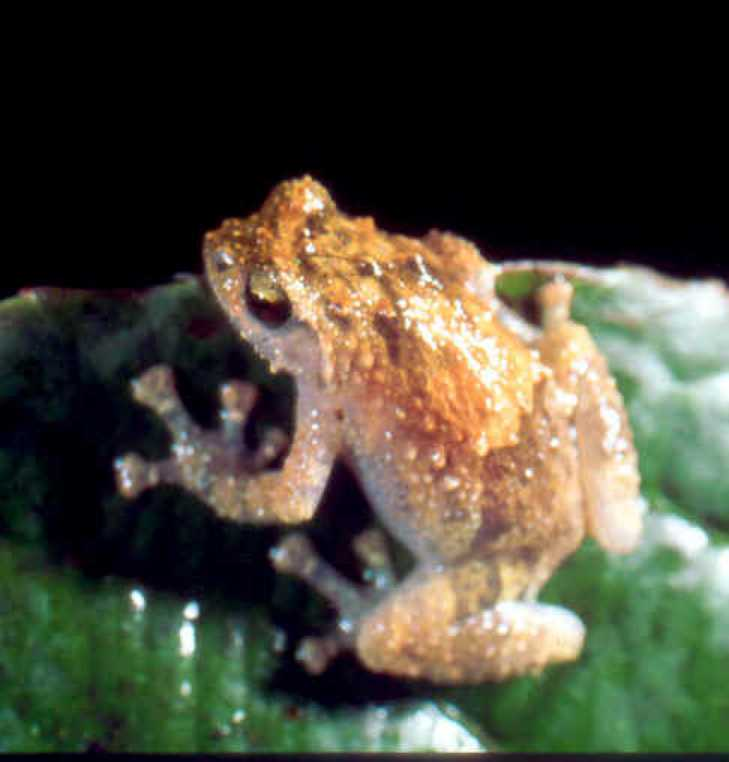
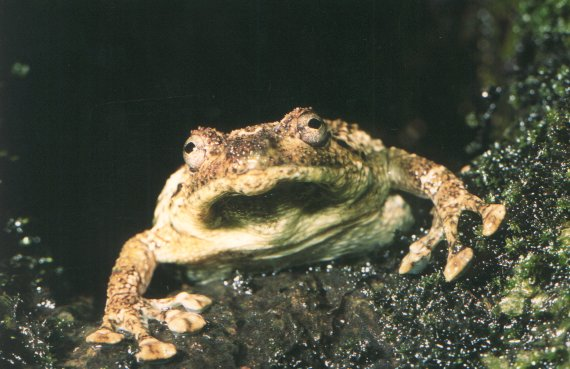
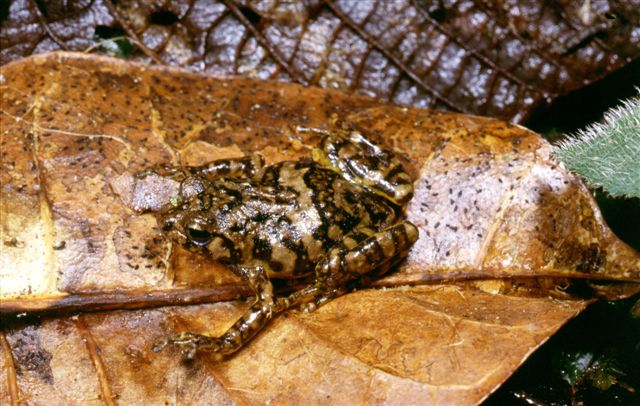
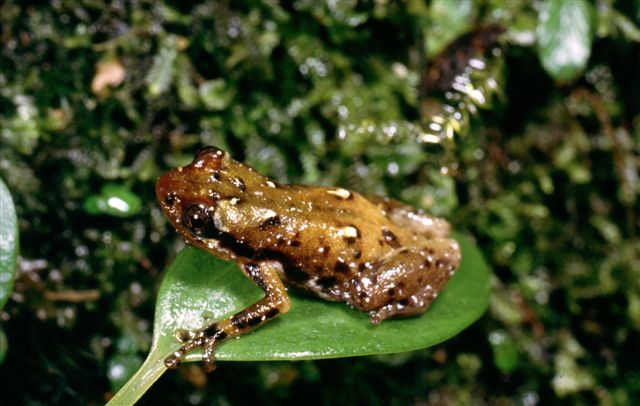
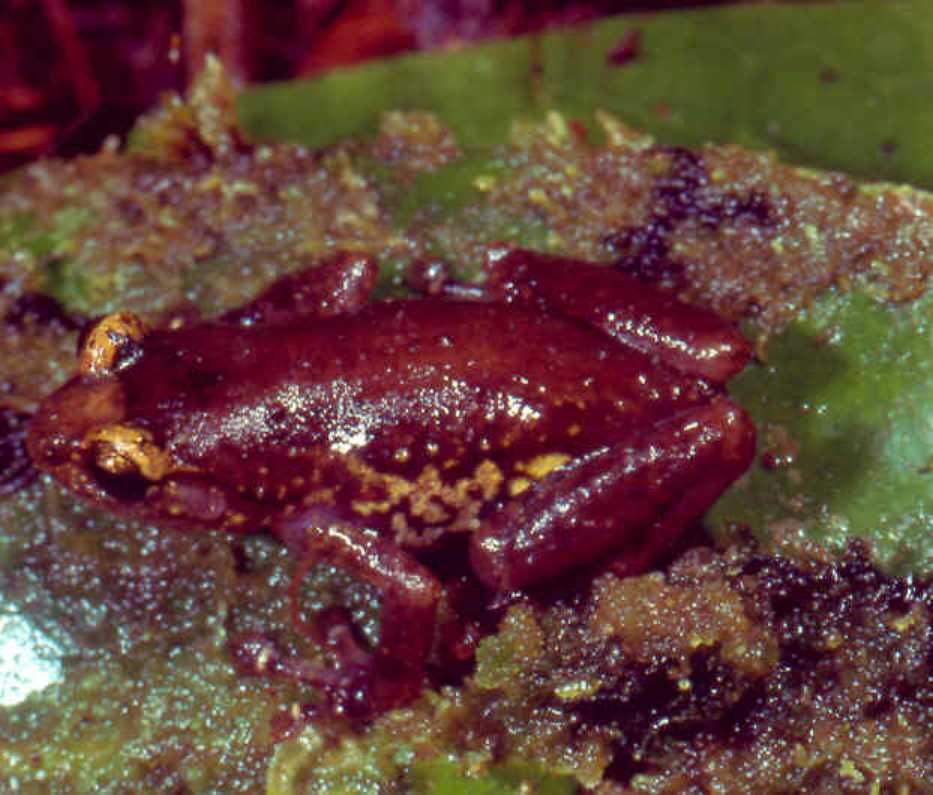
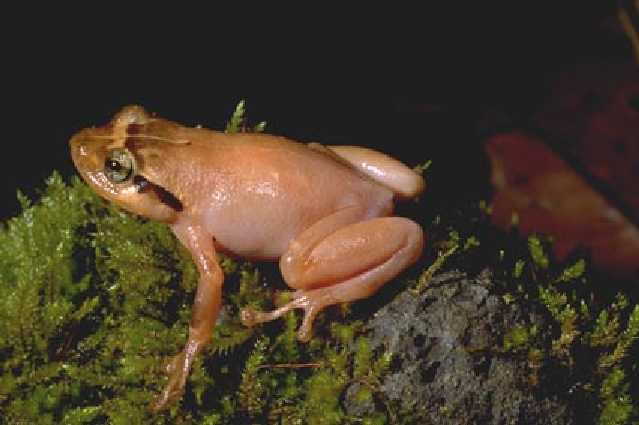
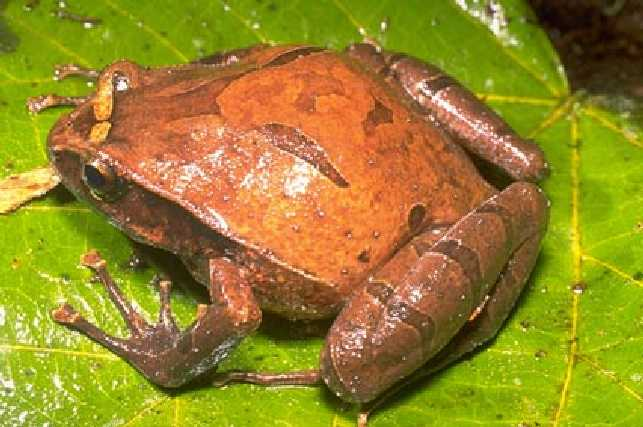
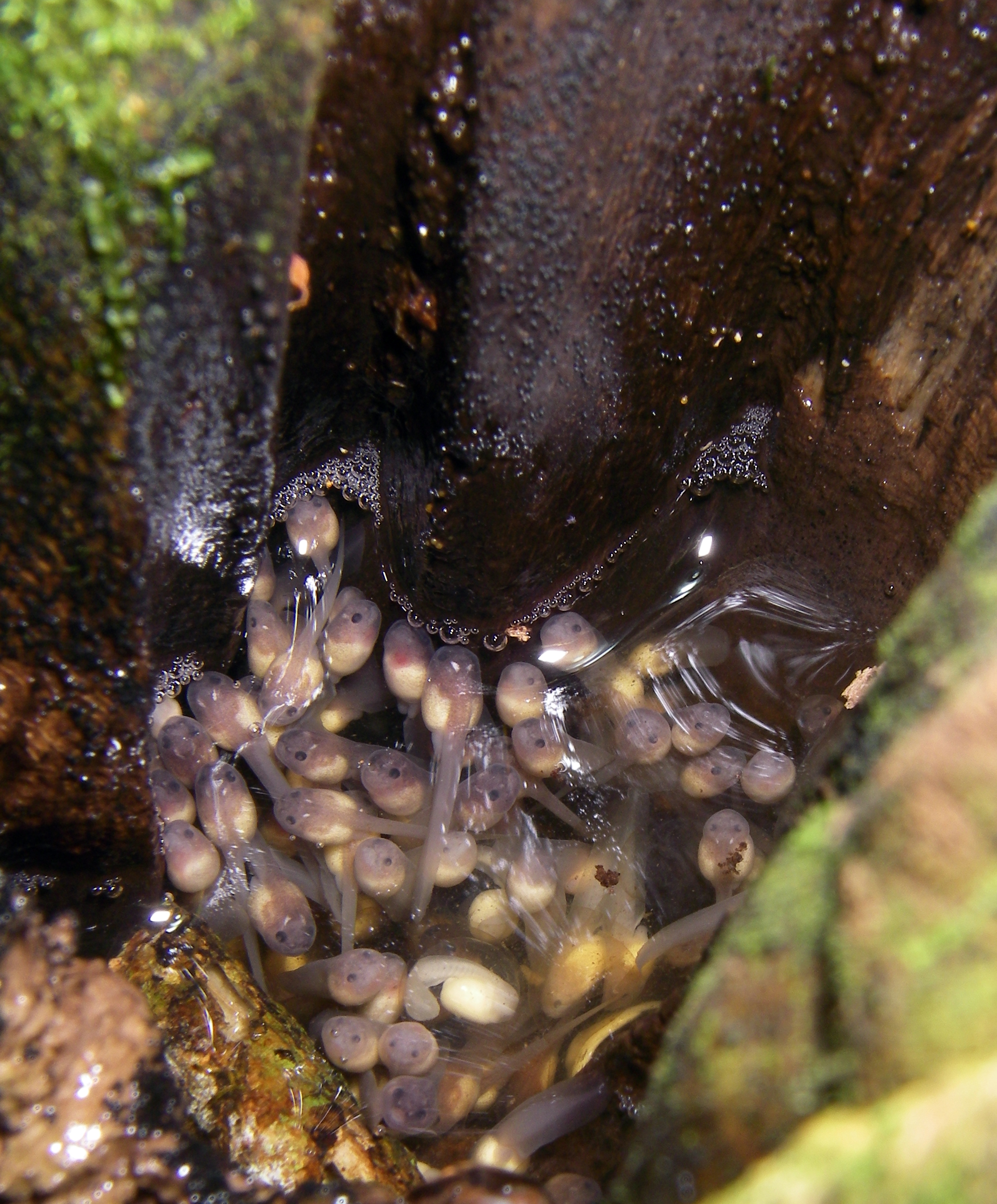
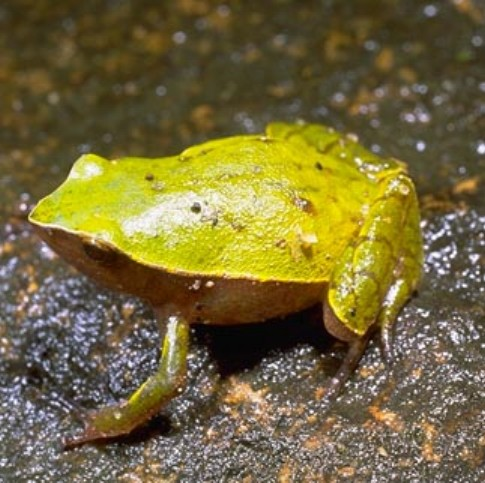
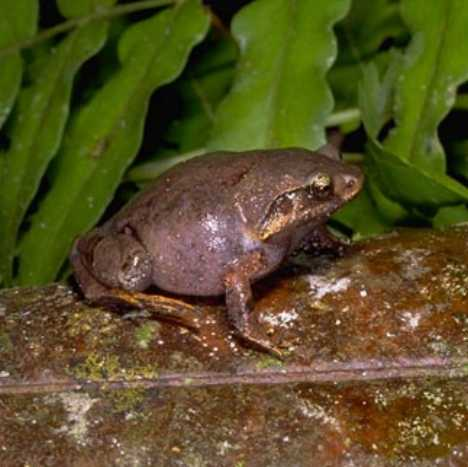
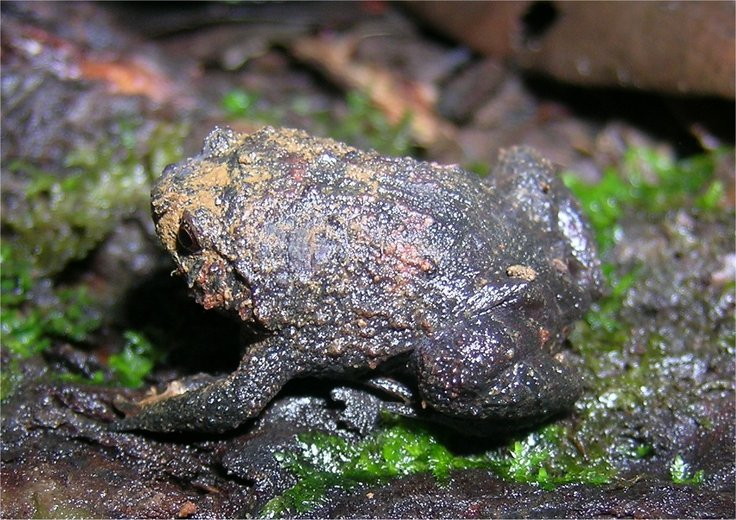
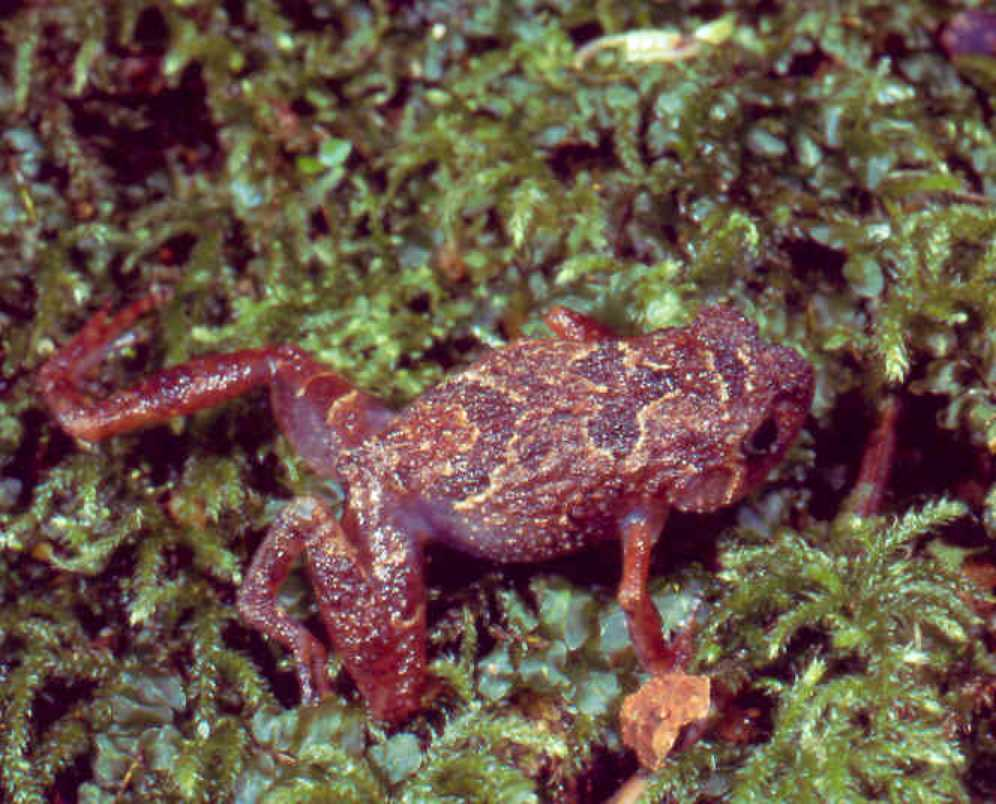
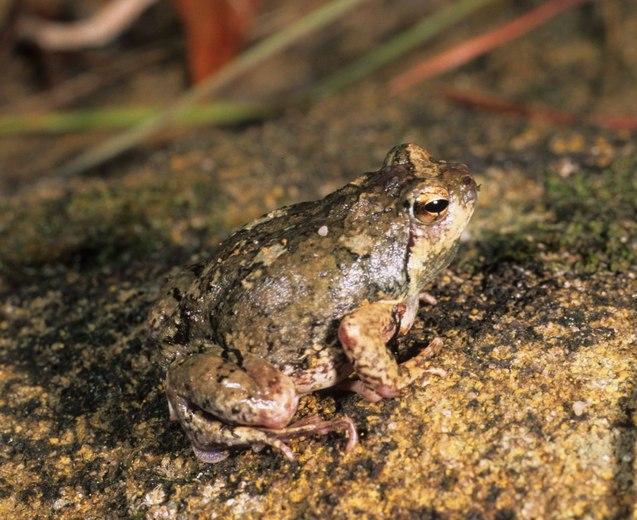
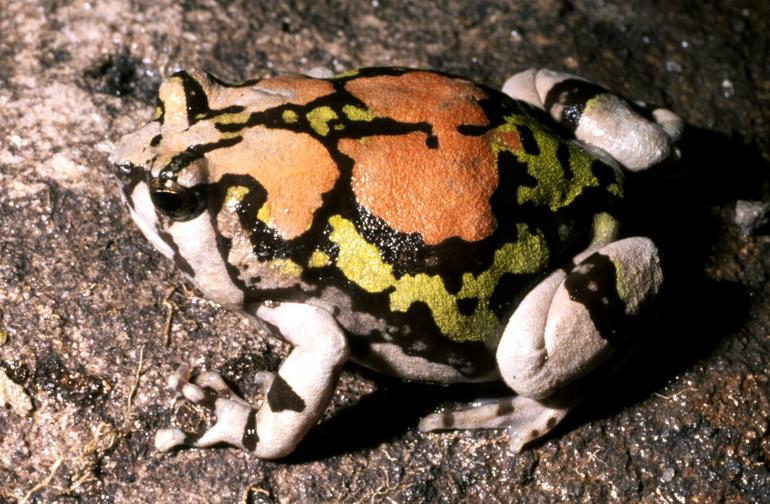
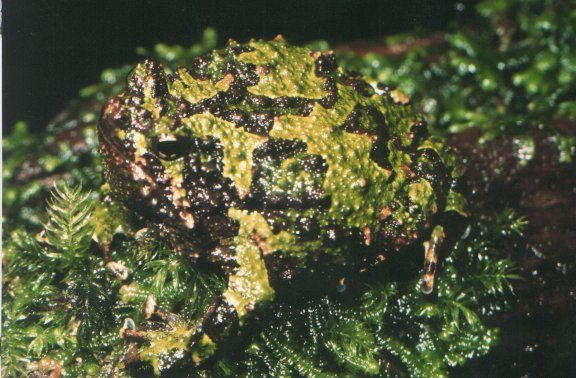
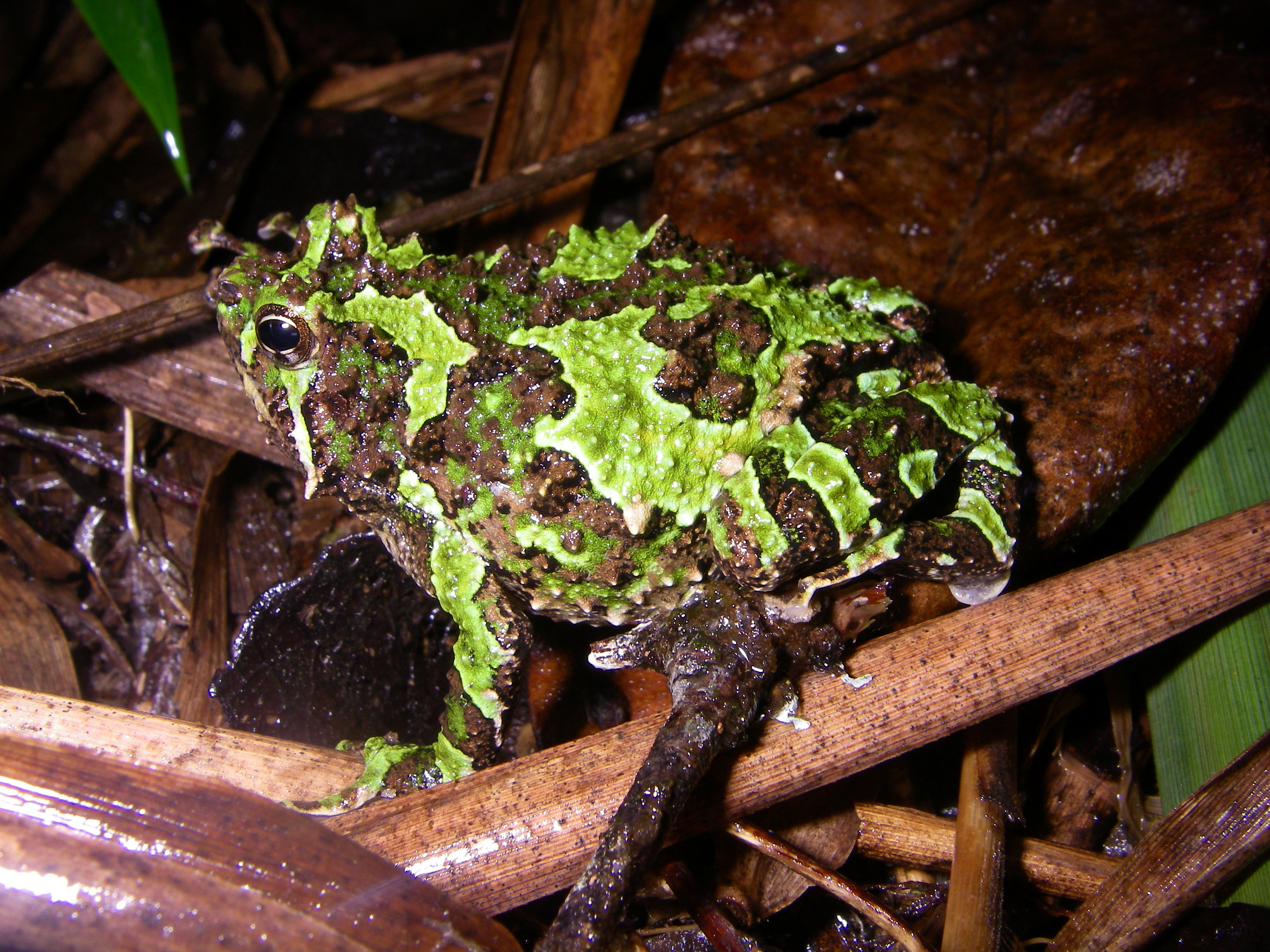
| Species | Status IUCN |
| Anilany helenae |
| Anodonthyla boulengerii |
| Anodonthyla emilei |
| Anodonthyla hutchisoni |
| Anodonthyla jeanbai |
| Anodonthyla montana |
| Anodonthyla moramora |
| Anodonthyla nigrigularis |
| Anodonthyla rouxae |
| Anodonthyla pollicaris |
| Anodonthyla theoi |
| Anodonthyla vallani |
| Cophyla berara |
| Cophyla occultans |
| Cophyla phyllodactyla |
| Cophyla maharipeo |
| Cophyla noromalalae |
| Cophyla puellarum |
| Dyscophus antongilii |
| Dyscophus guineti |
| Dyscophus insularis |
| Madecassophryne truebae |
| Paradoxophyla palmata |
| Paradoxophyla tiarano |
| Platypelis alticola |
| Platypelis barbouri |
| Platypelis cowanii |
| Platypelis grandis |
| Platypelis karenae |
| Platypelis mavomavo |
| Platypelis milloti |
| Platypelis olgae |
| Platypelis pollicaris |
| Platypelis ravus |
| Platypelis tetra |
| Platypelis tsaratananaensis |
| Platypelis tuberifera |
| Plethodontohyla bipunctata |
| Plethodontohyla brevipes |
| Plethodontohyla fonetana |
| Plethodontohyla guentheri |
| Plethodontohyla inguinalis |
| Plethodontohyla mihanika |
| Plethodontohyla notosticta |
| Plethodontohyla ocellata |
| Plethodontohyla tuberata |
| Rhombophryne alluaudi |
| Rhombophryne coronata |
| Rhombophryne mangabensis |
| Rhombophryne coudreaui |
| Rhombophryne guentherpetersi |
| Rhombophryne laevipes |
| Rhombophryne longicrus |
| Rhombophryne minuta |
| Rhombophryne matavy |
| Rhombophryne ornata |
| Rhombophryne serratopalpebrosa |
| Rhombophryne tany |
| Rhombophryne testudo |
| Rhombophryne vaventy |
| Scaphiophryne boribory |
| Scaphiophryne brevis |
| Scaphiophryne calcarata |
| Scaphiophryne gottlebei |
| Scaphiophryne madagascariensis |
| Scaphiophryne marmorata |
| Scaphiophryne menabensis |
| Scaphiophryne obscura |
| Scaphiophryne spinosa |
| Scaphiophryne verrucosa |
| Scaphiophryne matsoko |
| Stumpffia analamaina |
| Stumpffia be |
| Stumpffia gimmeli |
| Stumpffia grandis |
| Stumpffia hara |
| Stumpffia kibomena |
| Stumpffia madagascariensis |
| Stumpffia megsoni |
| Stumpffia psologlossa |
| Stumpffia pygmaea |
| Stumpffia roseifemoralis |
| Stumpffia staffordi |
| Stumpffia tetradactyla |
| Stumpffia tridactyla |

== Ranidae ==
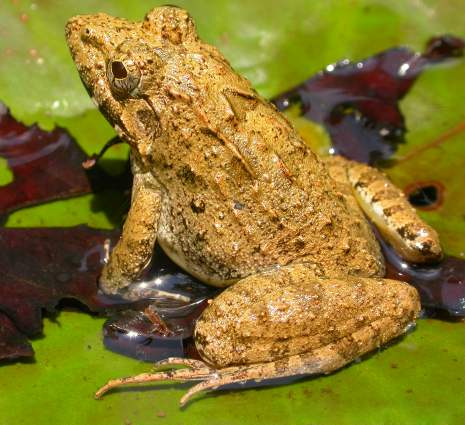
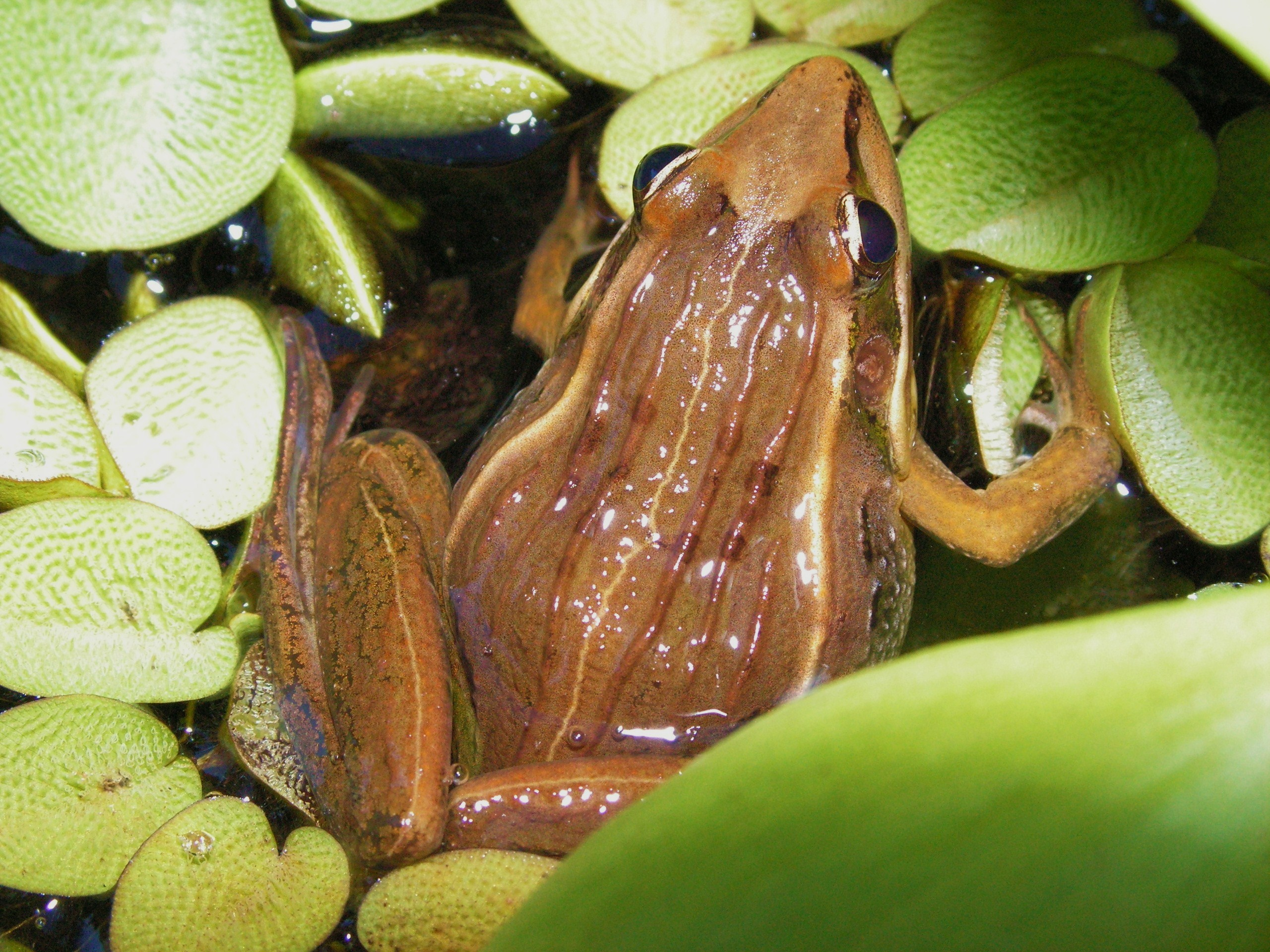
| Species | Status IUCN |
| Hoplobatrachus tigerinus |
| Ptychadena mascareniensis |
