= Boophis popi =

Conservation status
- Vulnerable (IUCN 3.1)

Scientific classification
- Kingdom: Animalia
- Phylum: Chordata
- Class: Amphibia
- Order: Anura
- Family: Mantellidae
- Genus: Boophis
- Species: B. popi

Binomial name
- Boophis popi Köhler, Glaw, Rosa, Gehring, Pabijan, Andreone, and Vences, 2011
- Approximate distribution (Madagascar) Range

Species of amphibian

Boophis popi is a nocturnal species of skeleton frog endemic to the forests of Madagascar. It is characterized by its red irises and distinctly elevated reticulations on the dorsum. It is brown and gray, has slender limbs, a pulsating call, and is slightly larger than similar frogs in its genus. The species was described in 2011 and is named after the company "pop-interactive GmbH".

== Taxonomy ==
B. popi is one of many species in the genus of skeleton frogs, and is in the B. goudoti group. It was described by Jörn Köhler, Frank Glaw, Gonçalo M. Rosa, Philip-Sebastian Gehring, Maciej Pabijan, Franco Andreone, and Miguel Vences in their 2011 paper titled "Two new bright-eyed treefrogs of the genus Boophis from Madagascar", and named after the German company "pop-interactive GmbH", which has supported biodiversity research and conservation. Through molecular genetics, it was found to be closely related to Boophis fayi and Boophis boehmei.

== Description ==
B. popi has distinct bright red outer irises, beige inner irises (with a brown vessel-like pattern) surrounded by a black ring, with blue in the iris periphery. The frog is brown-colored with several black and beige spots on its body, and the flanks have brown and yellow marks as well. The throat and chest are beige and gray, and the belly is light brown with small brown spots. Its limbs are gray with brown patterns. Preserved specimens tend to be lighter in color. Its throat and chest are smooth, its belly is granular, and it has white tubercles around its cloaca. Its arms are somewhat slender, its lower arms have fringes, and there is a pointed dermal appendage on the elbow. The fingers follow a 1<2<4<3 pattern of length, with the second finger being distinctly shorter than the fourth. It has slender hind limbs as well as a dermal appendage on its heel. It has five toes, which follow the pattern of length 1<2<3=5<4. Females are larger in size than males.

Though it appears to be morphologically similar to the other frogs in Boophis, there are several key differences that make B. popi a different species. Visually, B. popi is most similar to B. axelmeyeri, but is smaller in size (it has a smaller SVL, or snout-vent length) and has a less pointed snout when viewed from above. It typically has a larger SVL than B. boehmei.

When compared to B. rufioculis, B. popi has smaller cloacal tubercles and shorter hindlimbs. B. popi also has distinct elevated reticulations on the dorsum, while similar frogs do not. It is placed in the genus Boophis because of the intercalary element in between its last two fingers and toes, nuptial pads, and the lack of femoral glands in males.

== Behavior ==
B. popi is a nocturnal tree frog and is active on vegetation near slow-flowing streams during the rainy season.

B. popi calls contain two short series of pulsating notes, one with three notes and the other with two notes. Note duration varies from 18 to 29 ms and the pauses between notes range from 97 to 120 ms. Its pitch is similar to B. boehmei and B. quasiboehmei, but is slightly lower as its larger body size predicts. However, the calls of those in the B. goudoti group are very similar and are not unique to B. popi in particular.

== Habitat and distribution ==
B. popi can be found in the montane rainforest in central Madagascar. Its population is decreasing, and common threats include development, agriculture, mining, logging, fire, and invasive species and diseases.
