= Boophis haingana =

Conservation status
- Endangered (IUCN 3.1)

Scientific classification
- Kingdom: Animalia
- Phylum: Chordata
- Class: Amphibia
- Order: Anura
- Family: Mantellidae
- Genus: Boophis
- Species: B. haingana

Binomial name
- Boophis haingana Glaw, Köhler, De la Riva, Vieites, and Vences, 2010

Species of amphibian

Boophis haingana is an endangered species of skeleton frog endemic to southeastern Madagascar. It is characterized by its advertisement call, which has shorter note durations and faster note repetitions compared to other frogs in its genus. It is pale green in color and translucent at certain parts of the body, such as the dorsal and ventral skin.

== Taxonomy ==
Boophis haingana is one of many frogs in the B. albipunctatus group. Within the group, it is categorized as being within the same clade of species that are morphologically similar: B. ankaratra, B. schuboeae, B. miadana, and B. haingana. It was described by Frank Glaw, Jörn Köhler, Ignacio Riva, David R. Vietes, and Miguel Vences in their 2010 paper titled "Integrative taxonomy of Malagasy treefrogs: combination of molecular genetics, bioacoustics and comparative morphology reveals twelve additional species of Boophis".

In molecular phylogenetic analysis described in Glaw's paper, B. haingana differs 4.1–4.6% from B. ankaratra, 4.4–4.6% from B. miadana, and 4.6–4.8% from B. schuboeae.

The specific name is derived from the Malagasy word "haingana" which means "fast", in reference to the note repetition rate in advertisement calls, which is fast in comparison to other species.

== Description ==
Boophis haingana is pale green in color with yellow and brown spots. It has a greenish-blue throat, and its ventral skin is transparent. Its iris is white and red around the pupil, with a black ring surrounding it.

Females are larger than males, having approximately 136% of the male SVL. Calling males were observed to have a highly extensible single subgular vocal sac.

Boophis haingana has the traits typical for a frog in the Boophis genus such as having an intercalary element between the last and second-to-last fingers and toes, absence of femoral and gular glands in males, and enlarged terminal discs on the fingers and toes.

It is assigned to the Boophis albipunctatus group based on features such as its small size, absence of flaps on the heel and elbow, presence of webbing between fingers, an indistinct canthus rostralis, and having a translucent green dorsum, presence of vomerine teeth, and other features.

== Behavior ==
Within its clade, B. haingana has the shortest duration of notes in advertisement calls. The pulses of notes of B. hainganga are partially fused, differentiating it from frogs like B. ankaratra which have distinct pulses. Compared to B. miadana, B. haingana has shorter note duration and faster note repetition.

== Habitat and distribution ==
B. haingana is found in forests and wetlands in southeastern Madagascar. B. haingana is endangered according to the IUCN Redlist.
