= Boophis fayi =

Conservation status
- Vulnerable (IUCN 3.1)

Scientific classification
- Kingdom: Animalia
- Phylum: Chordata
- Class: Amphibia
- Order: Anura
- Family: Mantellidae
- Genus: Boophis
- Species: B. fayi

Binomial name
- Boophis fayi Köhler et al., 2011
- Approximate distribution (Madagascar) Range

Species of amphibian

Boophis fayi is a nocturnal species of skeleton frog endemic to the forests and wetlands or Madagascar with unusual greenish eyes. It is considered to be vulnerable by the International Union for Conservation of Nature.

== Taxonomy ==
Boophis fayi is a member of the B. goudoti group in the large skeleton frog genus. It was described in 2011 with another other frog, Boophis popi. The two were found to be closely related through molecular phylogenetics.

== Description ==
Boophis fayi was first found at the Betampona Reserve in Madagascar. Skeleton frogs are primarily identified by their eyes, and B. fayi has a greenish rather than red iris color and is characterized by green outer irises and turquoise iris peripheries. It also has a hardly perceptible supratympanic fold in males. The frog has an intercalary element between the last and second-to-last fingers and toes, nuptial pads, and the males do not have femoral glands, placing it in the genus Boophis. It is brown in color and has dermal flaps on the heels and elbows and white tubercules along the cloacal opening, classifying it as being in the B. goudoti group.

The species has a relatively small SVL (snout vent length) compared to the rest of the B. goudoti group, and is further distinguished by its unique eye color, small white tubercles in the cloacal region, and weak supratympanic fold. It also has substantial genetic differentiation from the rest of the group. Compared to frogs of similar size, it has a unique iris and has no elevated dorsal reticulation. Compared to larger frogs, males have a slightly larger SVL and shorter hindlimbs.

== Behavior ==
The frog can also be differentiated by its advertisement call, which is a series of 1–3 notes with durations of 100–370 ms. The notes pulse, but pulse repetition is fast. The note repetition rate is about 3.3/s. It also has another call, suspected to be a territorial call because of its similarity to that of B. tampoka. It is 1–2 click notes lasting up to 200 ms, depending on the number of notes. The notes do not pulse and note repetition is about 6–10/s. These series are separated by irregular intervals.

== Distribution and habitat ==
Boophis fayi can be found in the lowland rainforests and wetlands of the central east and northeast of Madagascar.

== Conservation status ==
According to the IUCN Red List the population is vulnerable and decreasing; threats include development, livestock farming, fire, invasive species and logging. Its conservation status has not been evaluated by any other source.
