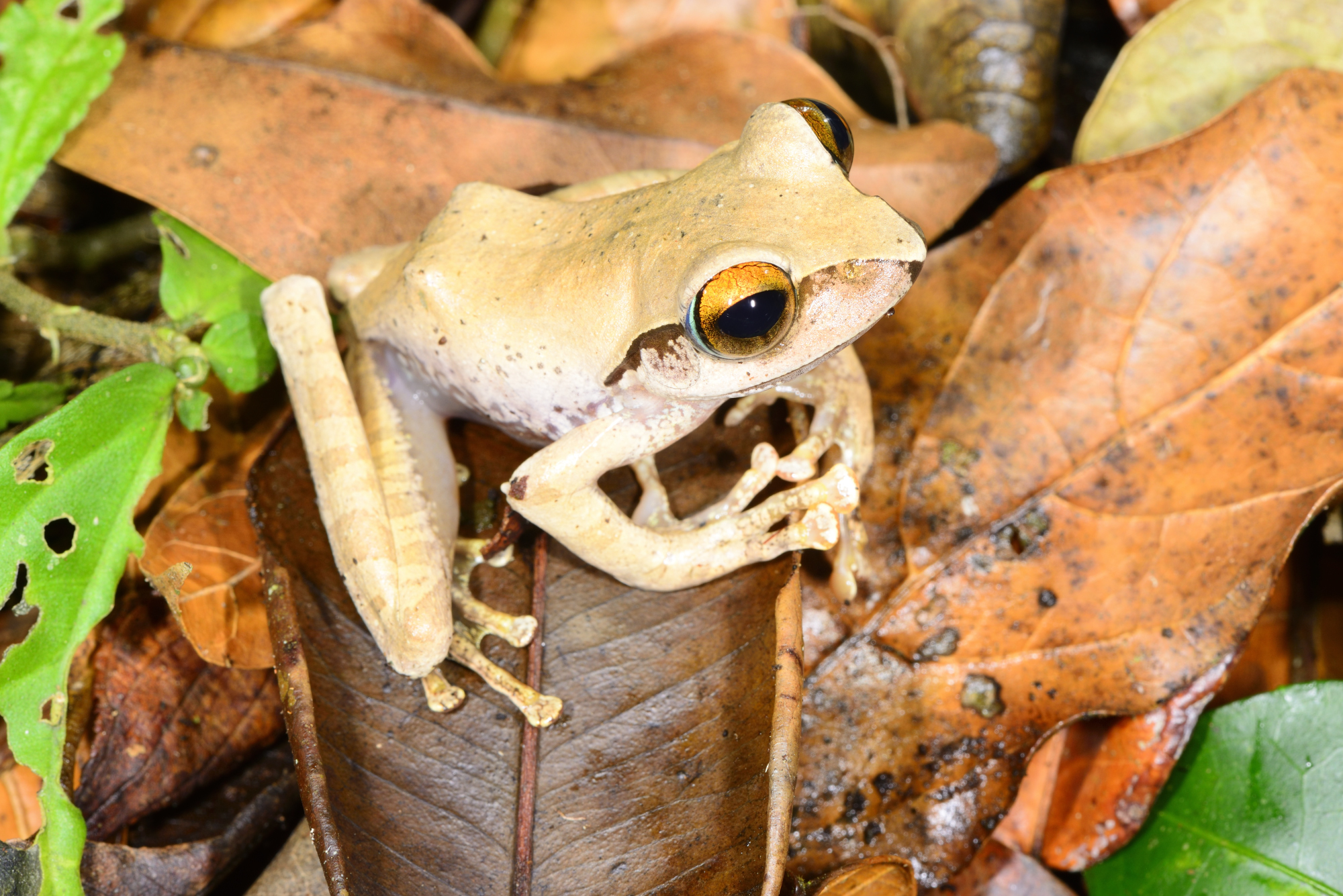

Conservation status
- Least Concern (IUCN 3.1)

Scientific classification
- Kingdom: Animalia
- Phylum: Chordata
- Class: Amphibia
- Order: Anura
- Family: Mantellidae
- Genus: Boophis
- Species: B. entingae

Binomial name
- Boophis entingae Glaw, Köhler, De la Riva, Vieites, and Vences, 2011

= Boophis entingae =

Species of amphibian

Boophis entingae is a species of skeleton frog endemic to northern Madagascar.

== Taxonomy ==
Boophis entingae is one of many skeleton frogs and is in the B. goudoti group. The specific name entingae is named after Hildegard Enting.

== Description ==
Boophis entingae is a light beige in color with brown markings and a light colored underbelly. The dorsum, legs, and parts of the head are pale gray with black sports. Its loreal region is grayish brown. The posterior of the thighs are light blue with black reticulation. The throat is off-white. The iris is copper in color, with small black spotting. The outer iris is black, while the iris periphery is turquoise green.

Boophis entingae possesses the characteristics typical of a frog in the genus Boophis such as an intercalary element between the last and second-to-last fingers and toes, the presence of nuptial pads and absence of femoral glands in males, absence of gular glands in males, enlarged terminal discs of fingers and toes, and features.

It is assigned to the B. goudoti group because of features such as brownish dorsal ground color, non-transparent ventral skin, presence of white tubercles under the cloacal opening, and other features.

Boophis entingae differs significantly genetically from other species in this group. It differs from B. roseipalmatus because of the smaller size of males and an absence of pinkish color on webbing and in the iris.

== Behavior ==
Males call at night from perch heights about 1–2 meters, along streams that are usually slow-moving and with a sandy floor. The advertisement call of B. entingae consists of a regular series of 2–4 moans. The distress call is one long pulsed note. There are two call types. The first is a series of 2–3 pulsing notes that become unharmonious at the end, spread over a large frequency range. The other is sometimes emitted, and it is a series of short click notes.

The advertisement and distress calls of B. entingae differ from B. brachychir because of its longer note duration, longer inter-note intervals and slower note repetition.

== Habitat and conservation ==
Boophis entingae occurs in rainforests at elevations below 700 m (2,300 ft), typically near relatively slow-moving streams with sandy bottoms. While it is locally abundant, B. entingae is threatened by ongoing habitat loss. It is, however, present in several protected areas.
