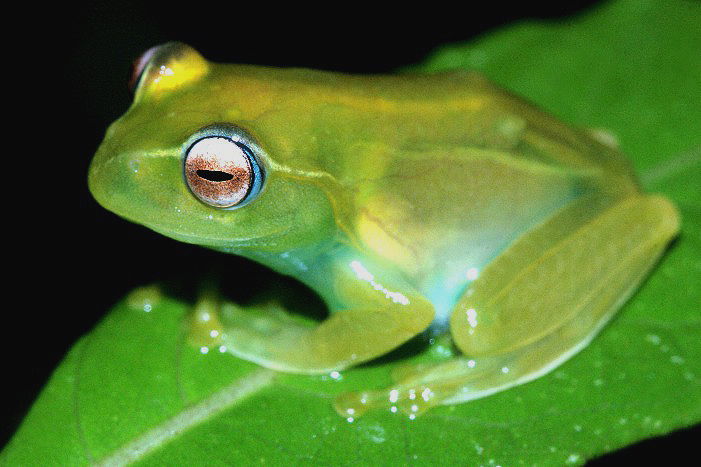
- Boophis ankaratra

Scientific classification
- Kingdom: Animalia
- Phylum: Chordata
- Class: Amphibia
- Order: Anura
- Family: Mantellidae
- Subfamily: Boophinae; Vences & Glaw, 2001
- Genus: Boophis; Tschudi, 1838

Type species
- Boophis goudotii Tschudi, 1838

Synonyms
- Buccinator Gistel, 1848

= Boophis =

Bright-eyed frogs

Genus of amphibians

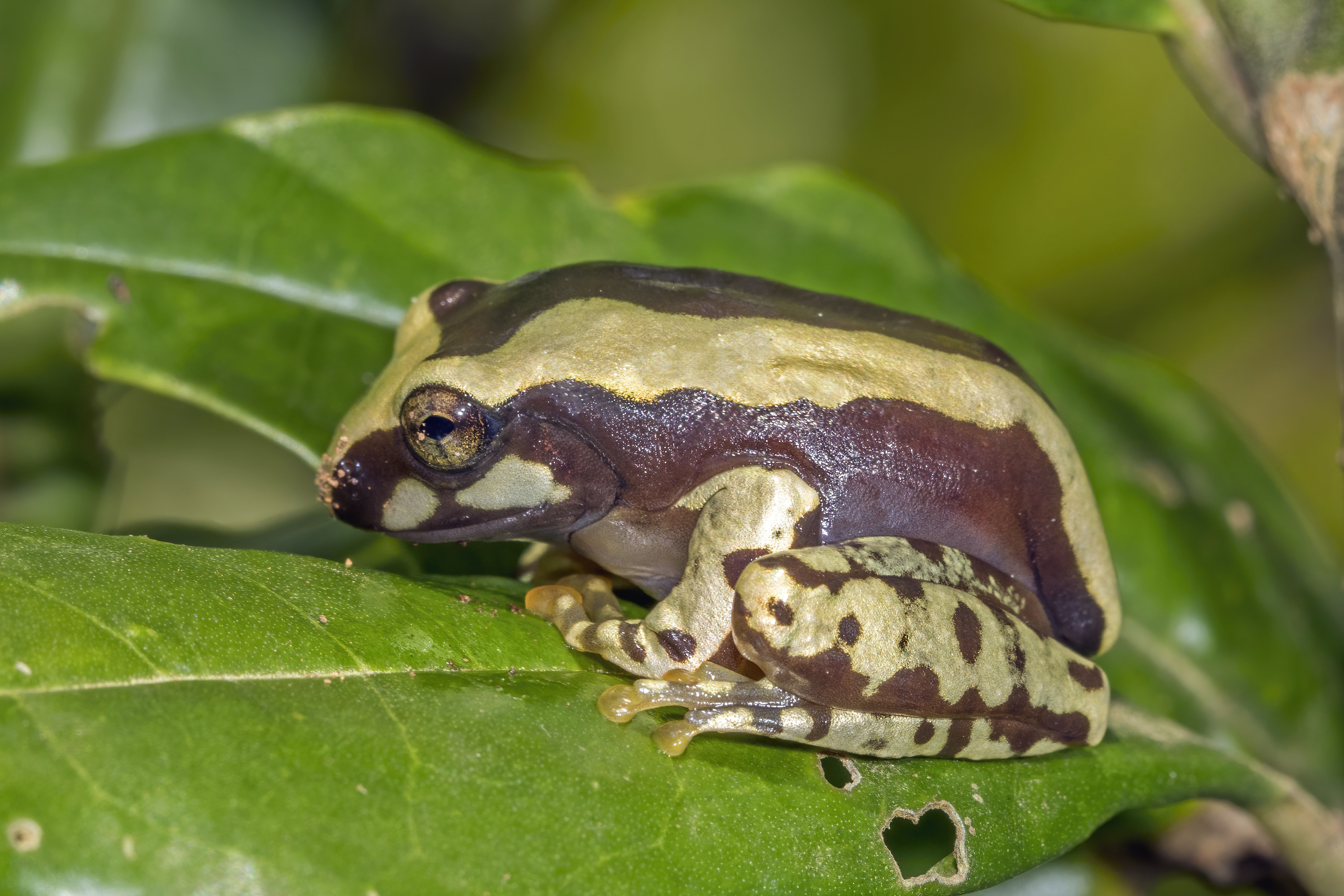
Juvenile Boophis cf. roseipalmatus Montagne d'Ambre

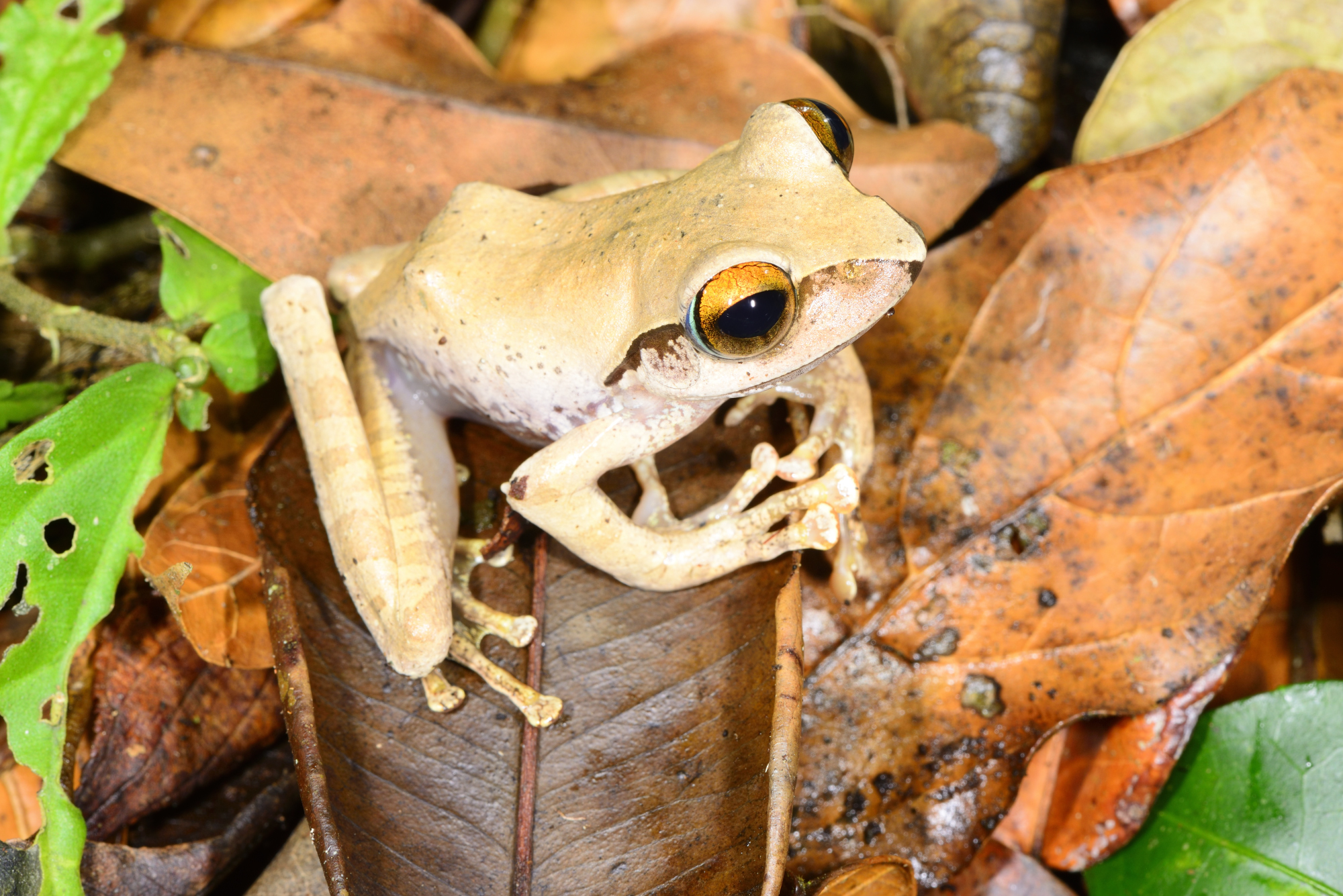
Boophis entingae from Montagne d'Ambre, photographed in 2017

Boophis (likely meant as "big-eyed" from Greek βοῶπις ("ox-eyed")) is the only genus in the mantellid frog subfamily Boophinae. They are commonly known as bright-eyed or skeleton frogs. They show typical 'tree frog' traits, and are a good example of convergent evolution with morphologically similar species in the families Hylidae and Rhacophoridae, among others. This genus can only be found on Madagascar and Mayotte Island (Comoros).

== Taxonomy ==
The genus Boophis was described by Johann Jakob von Tschudi in 1838. It was originally considered a member of the African-Asian family Rhacophoridae, but was moved to the family Mantellidae in 2001, into its own subfamily, Boophinae Vences & Glaw, 2001.

== Morphology ==
Boophis are arboreal frogs, exhibiting many traits that define 'tree frogs', such as expanded toe discs, long hindlimbs, and large kind eyes. Boophis are especially characterised by bright colouration of the iris, which is typically intricately patterned towards its inside, and often green or blue, but occasionally also red, purple, or yellow in the outer iris area. This has led to the vernacular name of bright-eyed frogs for the genus. Many species of Boophis have almost translucent skin, allowing bones and internal organs to be observed as in the unrelated glass frogs (Centrolenidae) of the tropical Americas. This has led to the vernacular name skeleton frogs for some members of the genus.

== Species ==
The genus has nearly 80 species; new ones are being described every few months on average. This list may not be exhaustive.

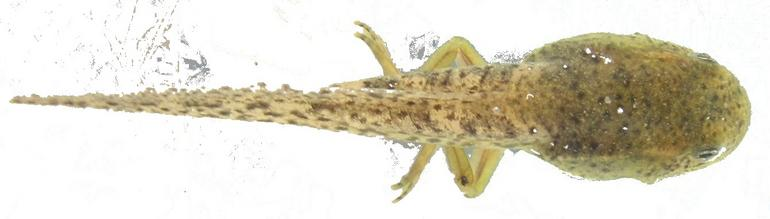
Boophis occidentalis tadpole

- Boophis albilabris (Boulenger, 1888)
- Boophis albipunctatus Glaw & Thiesmeier, 1993
- Boophis andohahela Andreone, Nincheri & Piazza, 1995
- Boophis andrangoloaka (Ahl, 1928)
- Boophis andreonei Glaw & Vences, 1994
- Boophis anjanaharibeensis Andreone, 1996
- Boophis ankarafensis Penny, Andreone, Crottini, Holderied, Rakotozafy, Schwitzer & Rosa, 2014
- Boophis ankaratra Andreone, 1993
- Boophis arcanus Glaw, J. Köhler, De la Riva, Vieites & Vences, 2010
- Boophis archeri Vences et al., 2024
- Boophis axelmeyeri Vences, Andreone & Veities, 2005
- Boophis baetkei J. Köhler, Glaw & Vences, 2008
- Boophis blommersae Glaw & Vences, 1994
- Boophis boehmei Glaw & Vences, 1992
- Boophis boppa Hutter, Lambert, Andriampenomanana & Vences, 2015
- Boophis bottae Vences & Glaw, 2002
- Boophis brachychir Boettger, 1882
- Boophis burnhamae Vences et al., 2024
- Boophis burgeri Glaw & Vences, 1994
- Boophis calcaratus Vallan, Vences & Glaw, 2010
- Boophis doulioti Angel, 1934
- Boophis elenae Andreone, 1993
- Boophis englaenderi Glaw & Vences, 1994
- Boophis entingae Glaw, J. Köhler, De la Riva, Vieites & Vences, 2010
- Boophis erythrodactylus (Guibé, 1953)
- Boophis fayi J. Köhler, Glaw, Rosa, Gehring, Pabijan, Andreone & Vences, 2011
- Boophis feonnyala Glaw, Vences, Andreone & Vallan, 2001
- Boophis goudotii Tschudi, 1838
- Boophis guibei (McCarthy, 1978)
- Boophis haematopus Glaw, Vences, Andreone & Vallan, 2001
- Boophis haingana Glaw, J. Köhler, De la Riva, Vieites & Vences, 2010
- Boophis idae (Steindachner, 1867)
- Boophis jaegeri Glaw & Vences, 1992 – Green Skeleton Frog
- Boophis janewayae Vences et al., 2024
- Boophis kirki Vences et al., 2024
- Boophis laurenti Guibé, 1947
- Boophis liami Vallan, Vences & Glaw, 2003
- Boophis lichenoides Vallan, Glaw, Andreone & Cadle, 1998
- Boophis lilianae J. Köhler, Glaw & Vences, 2008
- Boophis luciae Glaw, J. Köhler, De la Riva, Vieites & Vences, 2010
- Boophis luteus (Boulenger, 1882)
- Boophis madagascariensis (W. Peters, 1874)
- Boophis majori (Boulenger, 1896)
- Boophis mandraka Blommers-Schlösser, 1979
- Boophis marojezensis Glaw & Vences, 1994
- Boophis masoala Glaw, Scherz, Prötzel & Vences, 2018
- Boophis miadana Glaw, J. Köhler, De la Riva, Vieites & Vences, 2010
- Boophis microtympanum (Boettger, 1881)
- Boophis miniatus (Mocquard, 1902)
- Boophis narinsi Vences, Gehara, J. Köhler & Glaw, 2012
- Boophis nauticus Glaw, Hawlitschek, K. Glaw & Vences, 2019
- Boophis obscurus (Boettger, 1913)
- Boophis occidentalis Glaw & Vences, 1994
- Boophis opisthodon (Boulenger, 1888)
- Boophis pauliani (Guibé, 1953)
- Boophis periegetes Cadle, 1995
- Boophis picardi Vences et al., 2024
- Boophis picturatus Glaw, Vences, Andreone & Vallan, 2001
- Boophis pikei Vences et al., 2024
- Boophis piperatus Glaw, J. Köhler, De la Riva, Vieites & Vences, 2010
- Boophis popi J. Köhler, Glaw, Rosa, Gehring, Pabijan, Andreone & Vences, 2011
- Boophis praedictus Glaw, J. Köhler, De la Riva, Vieites & Vences, 2010
- Boophis pyrrhus Glaw, Vences, Andreone & Vallan, 2001
- Boophis quasiboehmei Vences, J. Köhler, Crottini & Glaw, 2010
- Boophis rappiodes (Ahl, 1928)
- Boophis reticulatus Blommers-Schlösser, 1979
- Boophis rhodoscelis (Boulenger, 1882)
- Boophis roseipalmatus Glaw, J. Köhler, De la Riva, Vieites & Vences, 2010
- Boophis rufioculis Glaw & Vences, 1997
- Boophis sambirano Vences & Glaw, 2005
- Boophis samuelsabini Basham, Masotti, Jimenez, Razafitsimialona, Andrianatenaina, Rakotoarison, Glaw, Wright & Vences, 2026
- Boophis sandrae Glaw, J. Köhler, De la Riva, Vieites & Vences, 2010
- Boophis schuboeae Glaw & Vences, 2002
- Boophis septentrionalis Glaw & Vences, 1994
- Boophis sibilans Glaw & Thiesmeier, 1993
- Boophis siskoi Vences et al., 2024
- Boophis solomaso Vallan, Vences & Glaw, 2003
- Boophis spinophis Glaw, J. Köhler, De la Riva, Vieites & Vences, 2010
- Boophis tampoka J. Köhler, Glaw & Vences, 2007
- Boophis tasymena Vences & Glaw, 2002
- Boophis tephraeomystax (A.H.A. Duméril, 1853)
- Boophis tsilomaro Vences, Andreone, Glos & Glaw, 2010
- Boophis ulftunni Wollenberg, Andreone, Glaw & Vences, 2008
- Boophis viridis Blommers-Schlösser, 1979
- Boophis vittatus Glaw, Vences, Andreone & Vallan, 2001
- Boophis williamsi (Guibé, 1974)
- Boophis xerophilus Glaw & Vences, 1997

Nota bene: A binomial authority in parentheses indicates that the species was originally described in a genus other than Boophis.
