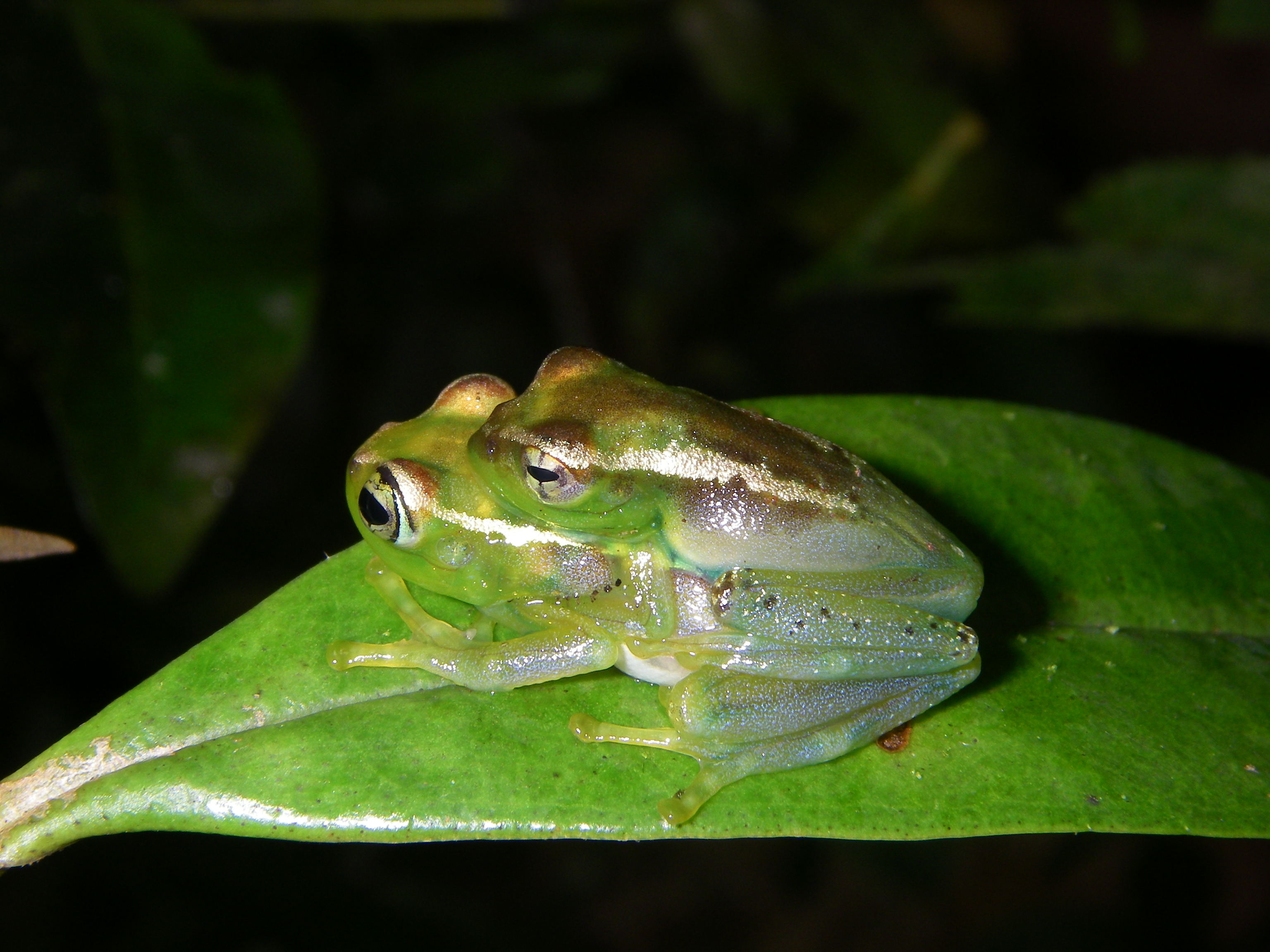

Conservation status
- Data Deficient (IUCN 3.1)

Scientific classification
- Kingdom: Animalia
- Phylum: Chordata
- Class: Amphibia
- Order: Anura
- Family: Mantellidae
- Genus: Boophis
- Species: B. lilianae

Binomial name
- Boophis lilianae Köhler, Glaw, and Vences, 2008

= Boophis lilianae =

Species of amphibian

Boophis lilianae is a species of frogs in the family Mantellidae. It is endemic to Madagascar and only known with certainty from its type locality near Tolongoina. There is also a possible record from the Ranomafana National Park.
