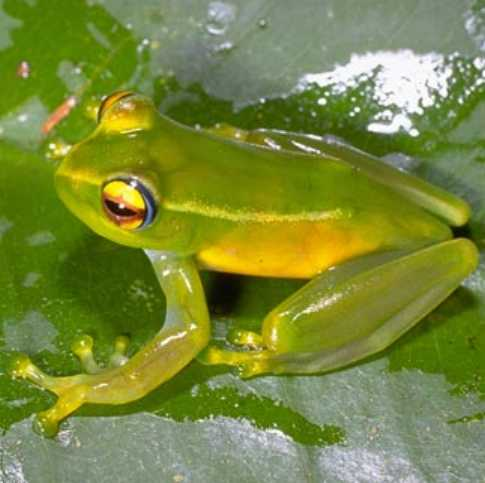

Conservation status
- Vulnerable (IUCN 3.1)

Scientific classification
- Kingdom: Animalia
- Phylum: Chordata
- Class: Amphibia
- Order: Anura
- Family: Mantellidae
- Genus: Boophis
- Species: B. andohahela

Binomial name
- Boophis andohahela Andreone, Nincheri & Piazza, 1995

= Boophis andohahela =

Species of frog

Boophis andohahela is a species of frog in the family Mantellidae. It is endemic to Madagascar, officially known only from Andohahela National Park and unofficially from Ranomafana National Park. Its natural habitats are subtropical or tropical moist lowland forests, subtropical or tropical moist montane forests, and rivers. It is protected in its currently known areas, but if it exists outside if it, it may threatened by habitat loss by agriculture, timber extraction, charcoal manufacturing, invasive eucalyptus, livestock grazing and expanding human settlements.
