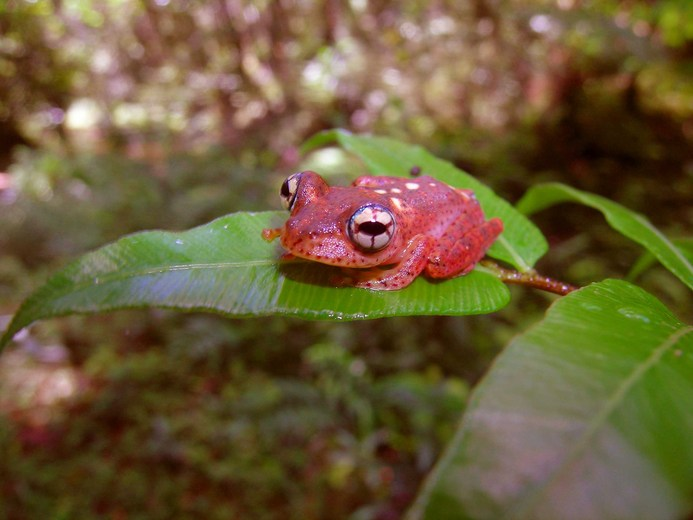

Conservation status
- Least Concern (IUCN 3.1)

Scientific classification
- Kingdom: Animalia
- Phylum: Chordata
- Class: Amphibia
- Order: Anura
- Family: Mantellidae
- Genus: Boophis
- Species: B. pyrrhus

Binomial name
- Boophis pyrrhus Glaw, Vences, Andreone & Vallan, 2001

= Boophis pyrrhus =

Species of frog

Boophis pyrrhus is a species of frog that belongs to the B. majori group of the family Mantellidae.

It is endemic to the eastern rainforests of Madagascar. Its natural habitats are subtropical or tropical moist lowland forests, rivers, and heavily degraded former forest. It is threatened by habitat loss.

== Related pages ==
- Amphibians of Madagascar
