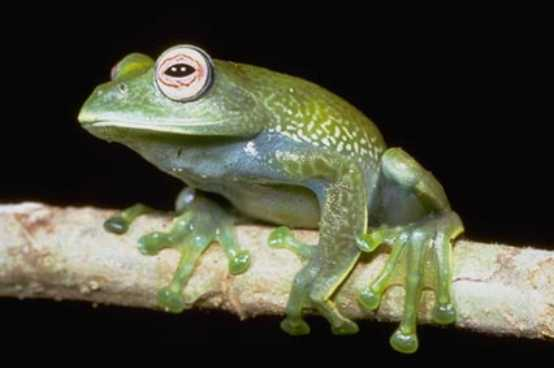

Conservation status
- Near Threatened (IUCN 3.1)

Scientific classification
- Kingdom: Animalia
- Phylum: Chordata
- Class: Amphibia
- Order: Anura
- Family: Mantellidae
- Genus: Boophis
- Species: B. elenae

Binomial name
- Boophis elenae Andreone, 1993

= Boophis elenae =

Species of frog

Boophis elenae is a species of frog in the family Mantellidae. It is endemic to Madagascar, known only from Ranomafana National Park (where it is abundant) and Farimazava Forest in Antoetra. Its natural habitats are subtropical or tropical moist lowland forests, subtropical or tropical moist montane forests, rivers, arable land, plantations, rural gardens, and heavily degraded former forest. Boophis elenae is threatened by habitat loss for agriculture, timber extraction, charcoal manufacturing, invasive eucalyptus, livestock grazing and expanding human settlements.

== Sources ==
- Andreone, F., Vences, M. & Glaw, F. 2004. Boophis elenae 2006 IUCN Red List of Threatened Species. Downloaded on 23 July 2007.
