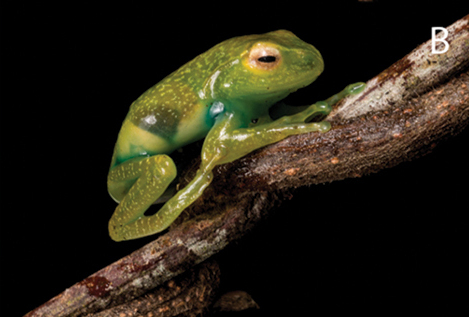

Conservation status
- Endangered (IUCN 3.1)

Scientific classification
- Kingdom: Animalia
- Phylum: Chordata
- Class: Amphibia
- Order: Anura
- Family: Mantellidae
- Genus: Boophis
- Species: B. boppa

Binomial name
- Boophis boppa Hutter et al., 2015

= Boophis boppa =

Species of frog

Boophis boppa, also known as Boppa's bright-eyed treefrog, is a species of frog in the family Mantellidae. It is endemic to Madagascar.

This species was first described in 2015 and is considered endangered.

== Distribution and habitat ==
Boophis boppa has been observed in the subtropical montane forests between Ranomafana National Park and Antoetra.

This species is observed in primary forests and inland wetlands.
