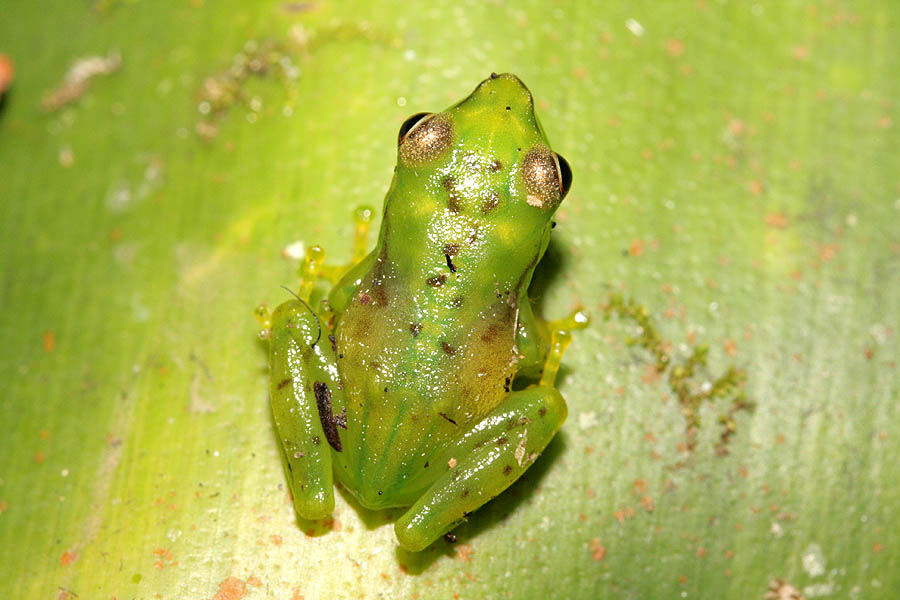

Conservation status
- Endangered (IUCN 3.1)

Scientific classification
- Kingdom: Animalia
- Phylum: Chordata
- Class: Amphibia
- Order: Anura
- Family: Mantellidae
- Genus: Boophis
- Species: B. jaegeri

Binomial name
- Boophis jaegeri Glaw & Vences, 1992

= Boophis jaegeri =

Green skeleton frog

Species of amphibian

Boophis jaegeri, also called the green skeleton frog, is a species of frog in the family Mantellidae. It is endemic to Madagascar. Its natural habitats are subtropical or tropical moist lowland forests, rivers, plantations, and heavily degraded former forest. It is threatened by habitat loss.
