= Boophis burgeri =

Conservation status
- Data Deficient (IUCN 3.1)

Scientific classification
- Kingdom: Animalia
- Phylum: Chordata
- Class: Amphibia
- Order: Anura
- Family: Mantellidae
- Genus: Boophis
- Species: B. burgeri

Binomial name
- Boophis burgeri Glaw & Vences, 1994

Species of frog

Boophis burgeri is a species of frog in the family Mantellidae. It is endemic to Madagascar, officially known only from Andasibe-Mantadia National Park with sightings in Marojejy National Park, Masoala National Park and Tsaratanana Reserve likely from another species. Its natural habitats are subtropical or tropical moist lowland forests and rivers. It is threatened by habitat loss for agriculture, timber extraction, charcoal manufacturing, invasive eucalyptus, livestock grazing and expanding human settlement.
