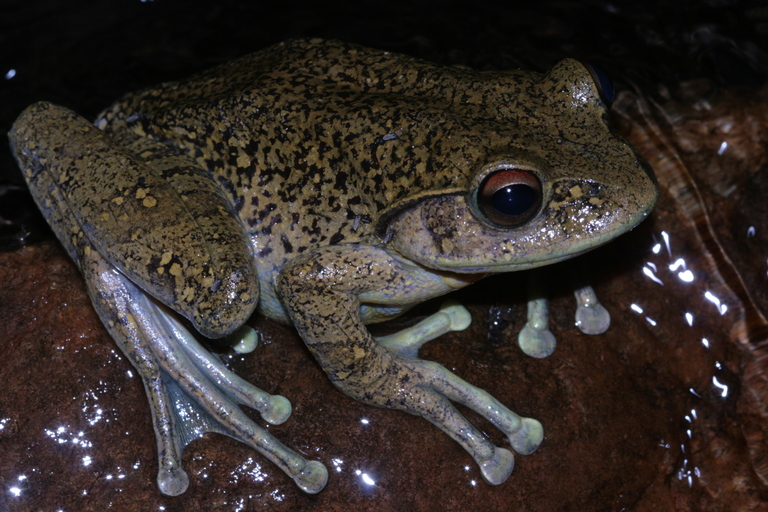

Conservation status
- Least Concern (IUCN 3.1)

Scientific classification
- Kingdom: Animalia
- Phylum: Chordata
- Class: Amphibia
- Order: Anura
- Family: Mantellidae
- Genus: Boophis
- Species: B. goudotii

Binomial name
- Boophis goudotii Tschudi, 1838

Synonyms
- Rhacophorus goudoti (Tschudi, 1838); Rhacophorus callichromus Ahl, 1928; Rhacophorus untersteini Ahl, 1928; Rhacophorus fasciolatus Ahl, 1929 "1928"; Rhacophorus flavoguttatus Ahl, 1929 "1928"; Rhacophorus hyloides Ahl, 1929 "1928"; Rhacophorus kanbergi Ahl, 1929 "1928"

= Boophis goudotii =

Species of amphibian

Boophis goudotii (common name: Goudot's bright-eyed frog) is a species of frog in the family Mantellidae. It is endemic to Madagascar where it is widespread on the high plateau of central Madagascar. Records elsewhere are uncertain and many of them represent misidentifications. It is the only Malagasy frog where females are known to be vocal.

== Etymology ==
The specific name goudotii honours Jules Prosper Goudot, a French collector active in Madagascar during the first half of the 19th century.

== Description ==
Males measure 50–70 mm (2.0–2.8 in) and females typically 75–87 mm (3.0–3.4 in) in snout–vent length, but they may grow as large as 100 mm (3.9 in) SVL. Colouration is variable, from almost entirely blackish to yellowish with black spots. Venter is yellowish or orange and may have blackish spots. The iris copper turquoise periphery. The tympanum is distinct. Males have nuptial pads and a subgular vocal sac.

Both males and females are vocal. Calls include irregularly emitted moaning notes, emitted during day and night.

== Habitat and conservation ==
Boophis goudotii is a common species that can be found in rainforests, fields, and disturbed stream sides near slow-moving or stagnant water. Its elevational range is 900–2,200 m (3,000–7,200 ft) above sea level. They are poor climbers but are sometimes found in trees. Breeding takes place in both permanent and temporary bodies of slow-moving or stagnant water.

While the forest habitat of this species is receding, it tolerates a broad range of habitats. It is also collected for human consumption, but not at levels that would pose a threat.
