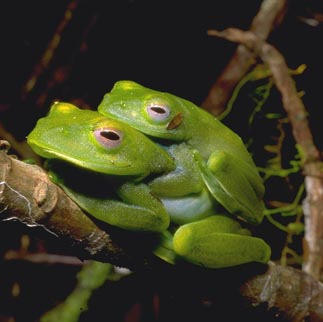

Conservation status
- Least Concern (IUCN 3.1)

Scientific classification
- Kingdom: Animalia
- Phylum: Chordata
- Class: Amphibia
- Order: Anura
- Family: Mantellidae
- Genus: Boophis
- Species: B. luteus

Binomial name
- Boophis luteus (Boulenger, 1882)

= Boophis luteus =

Species of frog

Boophis luteus is a species of frog in the family Mantellidae, endemic to Madagascar. Its natural habitats includes subtropical or tropical moist lowland forests, subtropical or tropical moist montane forests, rivers, and heavily degraded former forests. However, it is threatened by habitat loss. Boophis luteus has a snout-vent length of 35-60mm, with males measuring 35-40mm and one recorded female measuring 51mm. Its venter is bluish to greenish, and the skin on its back is smooth.
