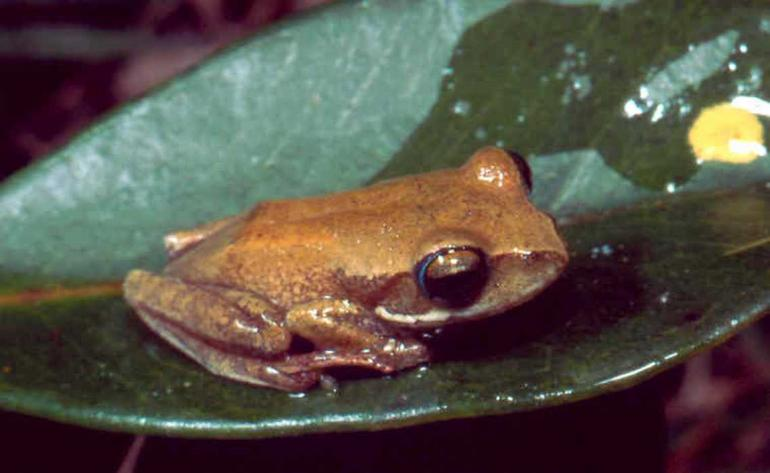

Conservation status
- Endangered (IUCN 3.1)

Scientific classification
- Kingdom: Animalia
- Phylum: Chordata
- Class: Amphibia
- Order: Anura
- Family: Mantellidae
- Genus: Boophis
- Species: B. rhodoscelis

Binomial name
- Boophis rhodoscelis (Boulenger, 1882)

= Boophis rhodoscelis =

Species of frog

Boophis rhodoscelis is a species of frog in the family Mantellidae.

It is endemic to Madagascar. Its natural habitats are subtropical or tropical moist lowland forests, subtropical or tropical moist montane forests, subtropical or tropical high-altitude grassland, and rivers. It is threatened by habitat loss.

== Sources ==
- Andreone, F., Vences, M. & Vallan, D. 2004. Boophis rhodoscelis 2006 IUCN Red List of Threatened Species. Downloaded on 23 July 2007.
