= Boophis sambirano =

Conservation status
- Endangered (IUCN 3.1)

Scientific classification
- Kingdom: Animalia
- Phylum: Chordata
- Class: Amphibia
- Order: Anura
- Family: Mantellidae
- Genus: Boophis
- Species: B. sambirano

Binomial name
- Boophis sambirano Vences & Glaw, 2005

Species of frog

Boophis sambirano is a species of frog in the family Mantellidae.

It is endemic to Madagascar. Its natural habitats are subtropical or tropical moist lowland forests, rivers, and degraded land that was previously forested.
