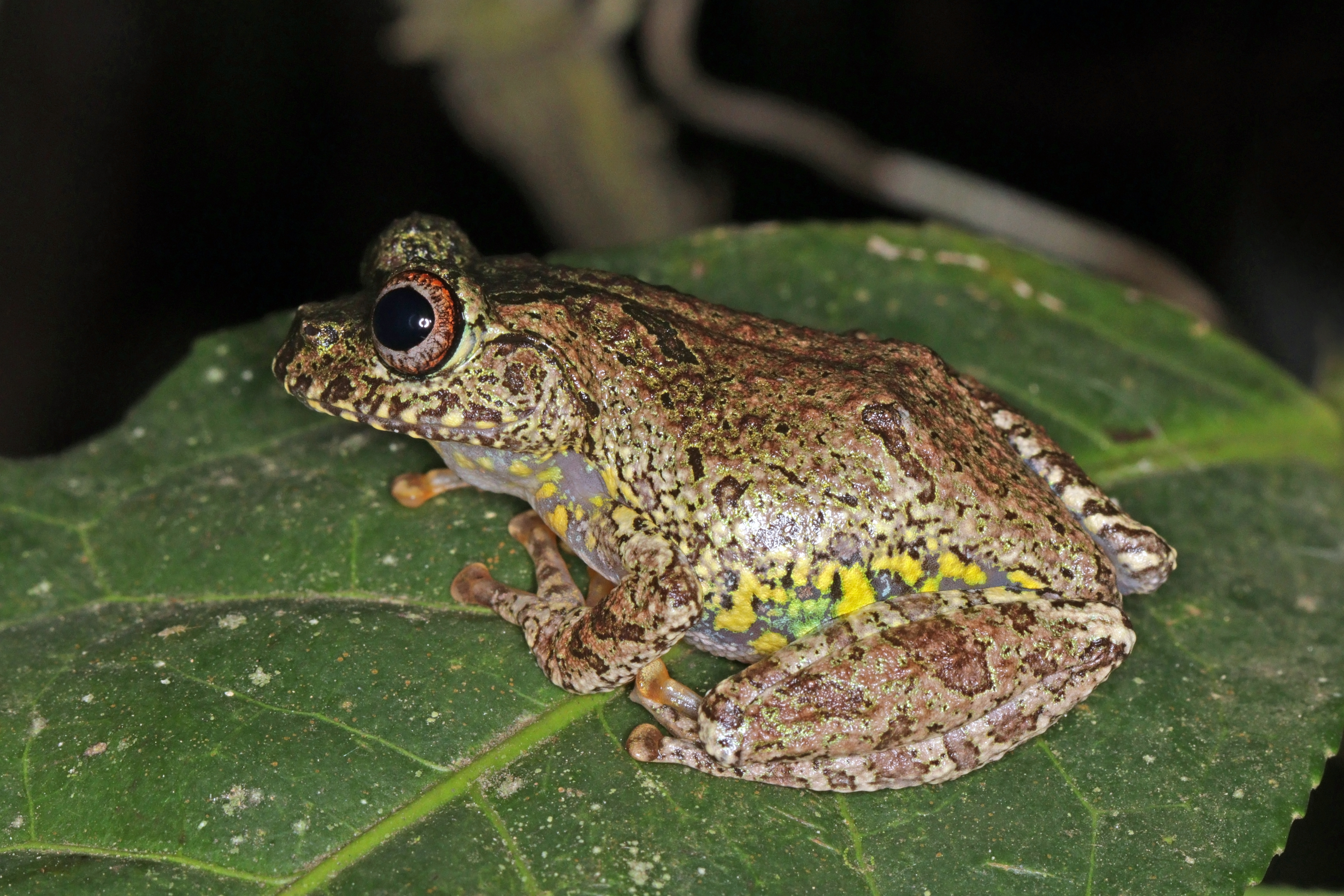
- Near Andasibe, Moramanga
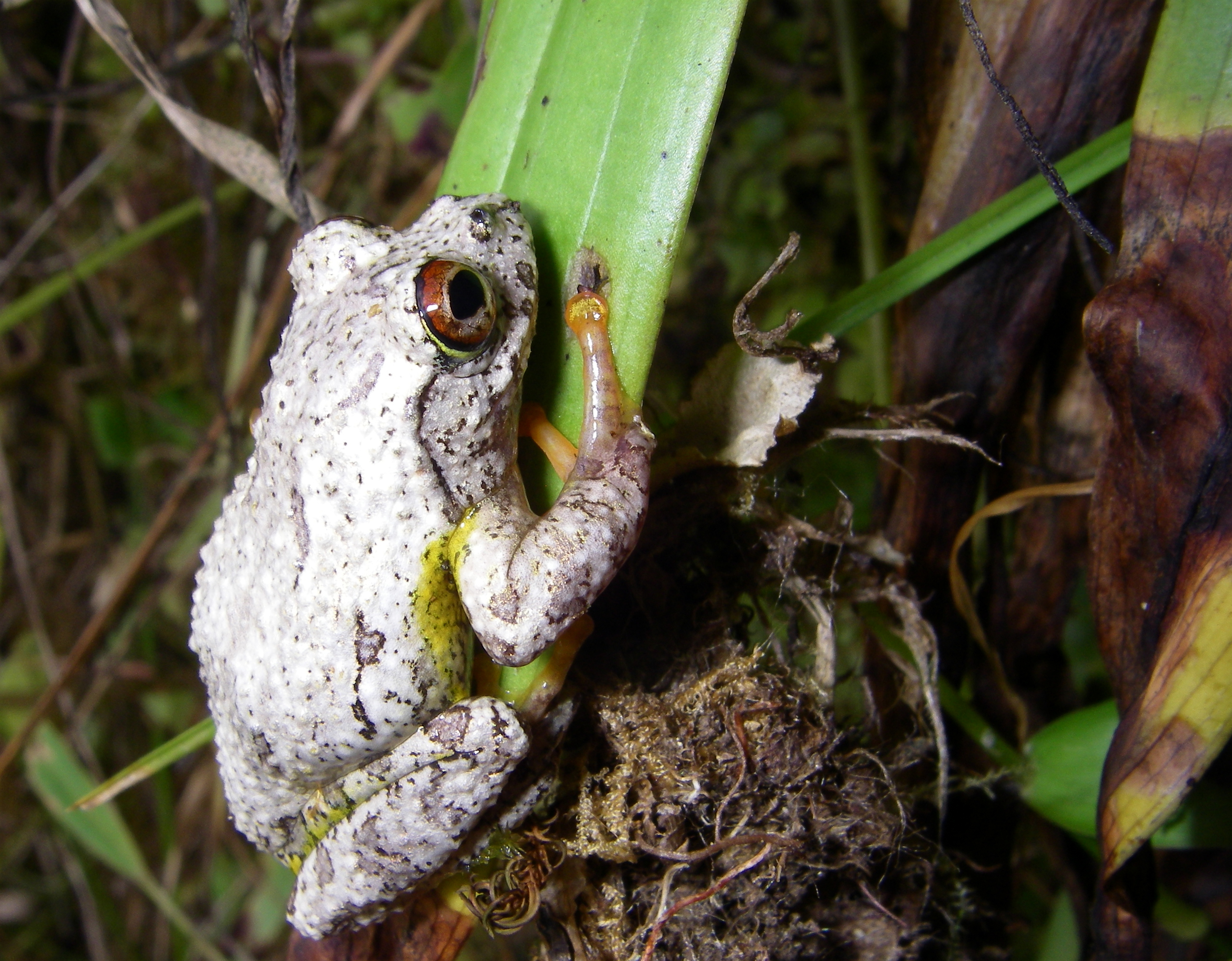
- Near Ranomafana, Ifanadiana

Conservation status
- Least Concern (IUCN 3.1)

Scientific classification
- Kingdom: Animalia
- Phylum: Chordata
- Class: Amphibia
- Order: Anura
- Family: Mantellidae
- Genus: Boophis
- Species: B. guibei

Binomial name
- Boophis guibei (McCarthy, 1978)

Synonyms
- Boophis granulosus (Guibé, 1975)

= Boophis guibei =

Species of frog

Boophis guibei, sometimes known as the warty bright-eyed frog, is a species of frog in the family Mantellidae. It is endemic to Madagascar. Its natural habitats are subtropical or tropical moist lowland forests, rivers, freshwater marshes, intermittent freshwater marshes, and heavily degraded former forest. It is threatened by habitat loss.
