= Boophis opisthodon =

Conservation status
- Least Concern (IUCN 3.1)

Scientific classification
- Kingdom: Animalia
- Phylum: Chordata
- Class: Amphibia
- Order: Anura
- Family: Mantellidae
- Genus: Boophis
- Species: B. opisthodon

Binomial name
- Boophis opisthodon (Boulenger, 1888)

Species of frog

Boophis opisthodon is a species of frog in the family Mantellidae. It is endemic to Madagascar. Its natural habitats are subtropical or tropical dry forests, subtropical or tropical moist lowland forests, swamps, freshwater marshes, intermittent freshwater marshes, and heavily degraded former forest.
