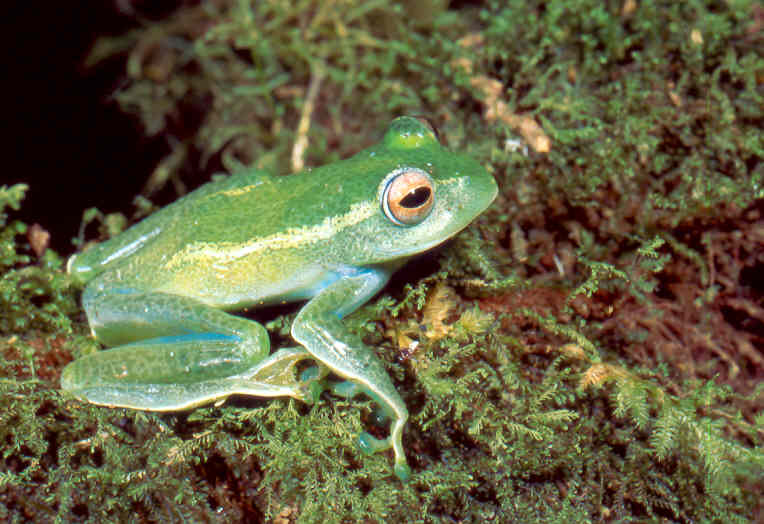

Conservation status
- Least Concern (IUCN 3.1)

Scientific classification
- Kingdom: Animalia
- Phylum: Chordata
- Class: Amphibia
- Order: Anura
- Family: Mantellidae
- Genus: Boophis
- Species: B. septentrionalis

Binomial name
- Boophis septentrionalis Glaw & Vences, 1994

= Boophis septentrionalis =

Species of frog

Boophis septentrionalis is a species of frog in the family Mantellidae. It is endemic to Madagascar, known only from Fôret d'Ambre and Amber Mountain National Park. Its natural habitats are subtropical or tropical dry forests, subtropical or tropical moist montane forests, rivers, and heavily degraded former forest. It is threatened by habitat loss for agriculture, timber extraction, charcoal manufacturing, invasive eucalyptus, livestock grazing and expanding human settlement and possibly by stream pollution.
