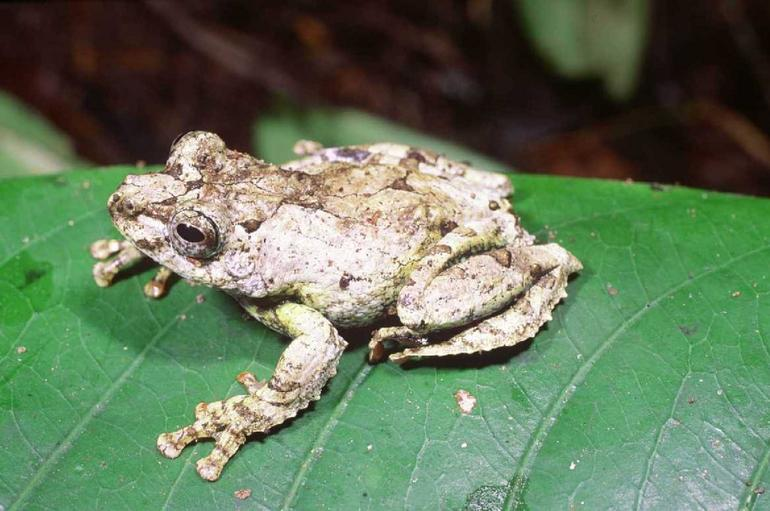

Conservation status
- Least Concern (IUCN 3.1)

Scientific classification
- Kingdom: Animalia
- Phylum: Chordata
- Class: Amphibia
- Order: Anura
- Family: Mantellidae
- Genus: Boophis
- Species: B. lichenoides

Binomial name
- Boophis lichenoides Vallan, Glaw, Andreone & Cadle, 1998

= Boophis lichenoides =

Species of frog

Boophis lichenoides is a species of frog in the family Mantellidae.

It is endemic to Madagascar.

Its natural habitats are subtropical or tropical moist lowland forests and swamps. It is threatened by habitat loss.
