= Boophis feonnyala =

Conservation status
- Endangered (IUCN 3.1)

Scientific classification
- Kingdom: Animalia
- Phylum: Chordata
- Class: Amphibia
- Order: Anura
- Family: Mantellidae
- Genus: Boophis
- Species: B. feonnyala

Binomial name
- Boophis feonnyala Glaw, Vences, Andreone & Vallan, 2001

Species of amphibian

Boophis feonnyala is a species of frogs in the family Mantellidae.

It is endemic to Madagascar, known only from Andasibe-Mantadia National Park but it likely occurs more widespread. It is protected in the national park, but if it occurs elsewhere, it may be threatened by agriculture, timber extraction, charcoal manufacturing, invasive eucalyptus, livestock grazing and expanding human settlements. Its natural habitats are subtropical or tropical moist lowland forests, rivers, freshwater lakes, heavily degraded former forest, and water storage areas.
