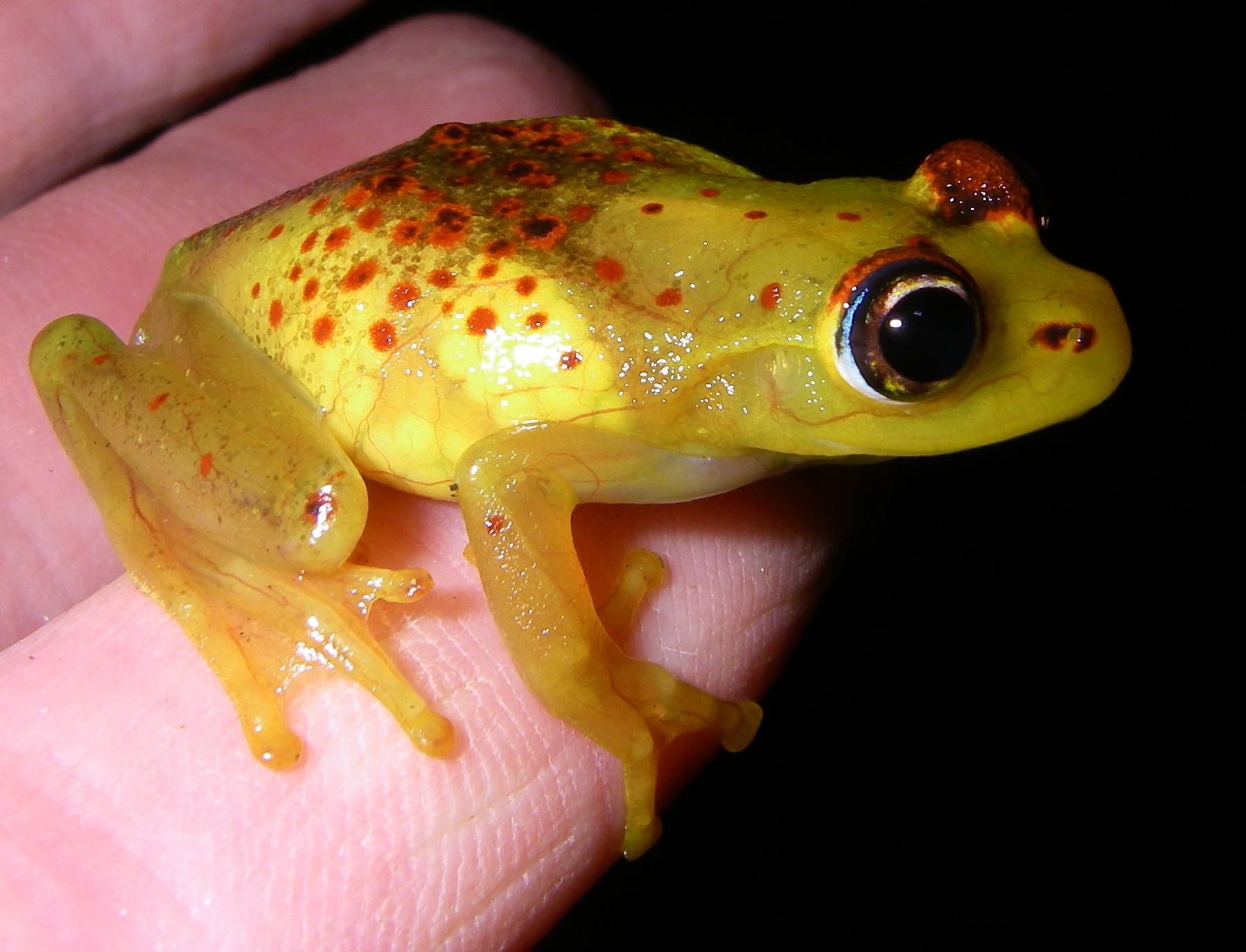

Conservation status
- Least Concern (IUCN 3.1)

Scientific classification
- Kingdom: Animalia
- Phylum: Chordata
- Class: Amphibia
- Order: Anura
- Family: Mantellidae
- Genus: Boophis
- Species: B. bottae

Binomial name
- Boophis bottae Vences & Glaw, 2002

= Boophis bottae =

Species of frog

Boophis bottae is a species of frog in the family Mantellidae endemic to Madagascar.

== Distribution and habitat ==
The species inhabits the eastern rainforest belt of Madagascar at altitudes of 800–1,000 m. It occurs along forest streams, in which it is assumed to breed, and can be found at the edge but never fully outside of rainforest.

== Behavior ==
The species can be characterized by its unique call, consisting of long trills made up of double clicks. The calls that they emit are made up of variations of notes, each note containing one longer and one shorter click pulse.

== Conservation ==
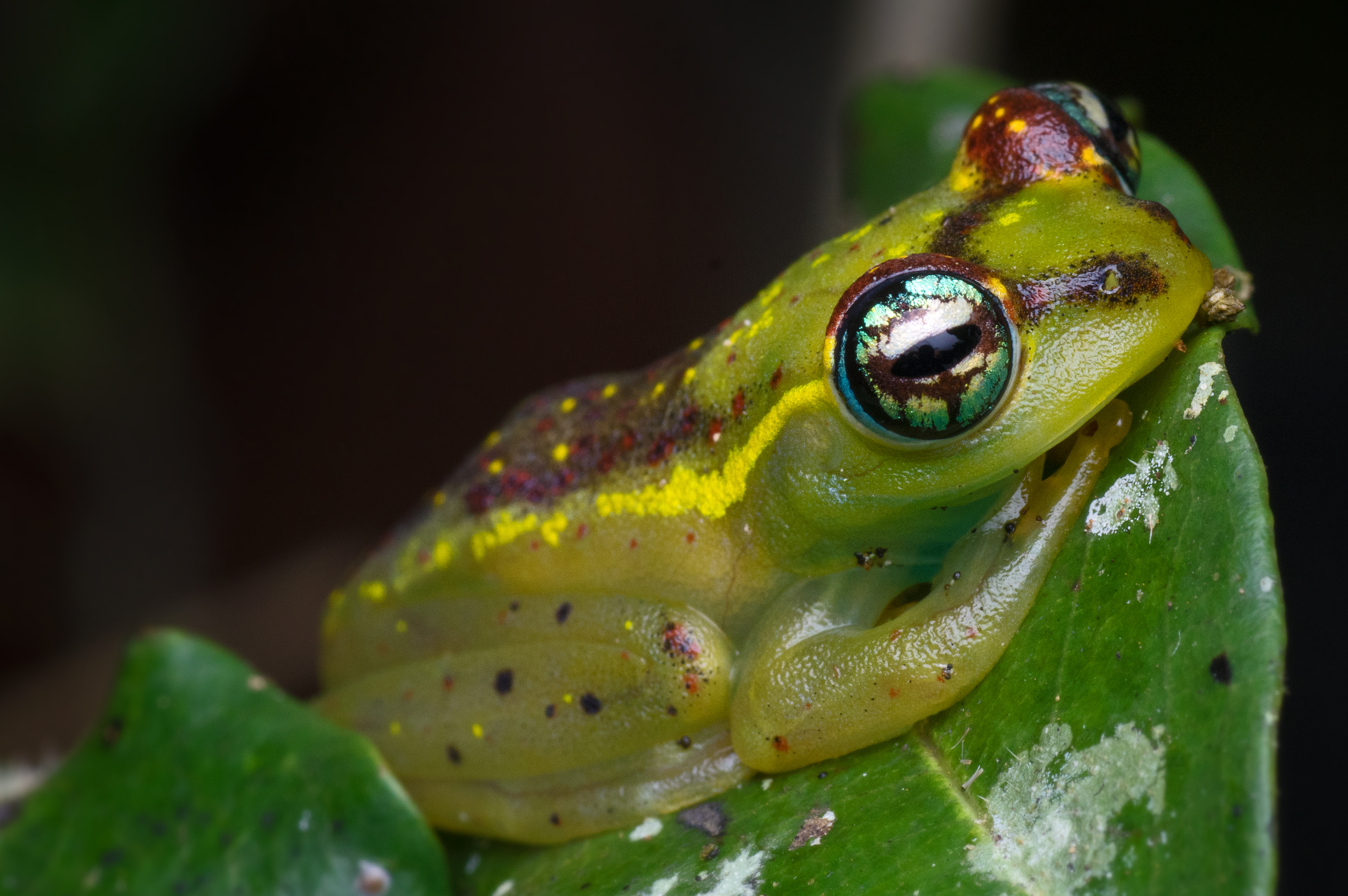
In the Andasibe-Mantadia National Park

Boophis bottae is locally abundant and currently classified as Least Concern by the IUCN. However, populations are suspected to be shrinking due to ongoing habitat destruction through agriculture, logging, charcoaling, and various invasive species. Other species in this genus have shown susceptibility to chytridiomycosis, however this does not currently appear to afflict amphibians in Madagascar.
