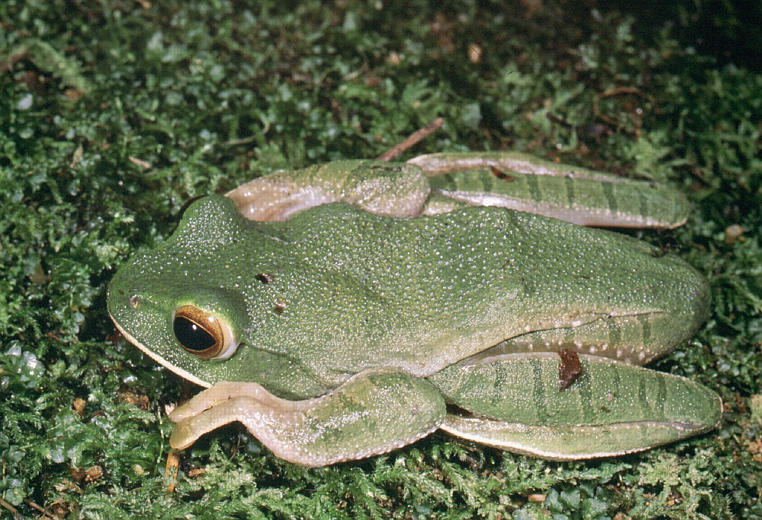

Conservation status
- Least Concern (IUCN 3.1)

Scientific classification
- Kingdom: Animalia
- Phylum: Chordata
- Class: Amphibia
- Order: Anura
- Family: Mantellidae
- Genus: Boophis
- Species: B. albilabris

Binomial name
- Boophis albilabris (Boulenger, 1888)

= White-lipped bright-eyed frog =

Species of amphibian

The white-lipped bright-eyed frog (Boophis albilabris) is a species of frog in the family Mantellidae. It is endemic to Madagascar. Its natural habitats are subtropical or tropical moist lowland forests, subtropical or tropical moist montane forests, rivers, intermittent rivers, and heavily degraded former forest. It is threatened by habitat loss.
