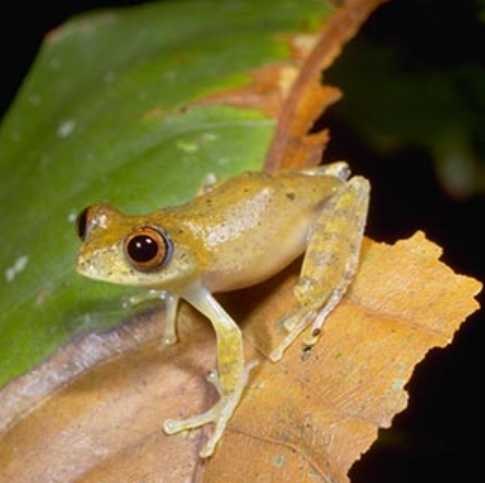

Conservation status
- Least Concern (IUCN 3.1)

Scientific classification
- Kingdom: Animalia
- Phylum: Chordata
- Class: Amphibia
- Order: Anura
- Family: Mantellidae
- Genus: Boophis
- Species: B. marojezensis

Binomial name
- Boophis marojezensis Glaw & Vences, 1994

= Boophis marojezensis =

Species of frog

Boophis marojezensis is a species of frog in the family Mantellidae. It is endemic to Madagascar.

Its natural habitats are subtropical or tropical moist lowland forests and rivers. It is threatened by habitat loss.
