= Boophis albipunctatus =

Conservation status
- Least Concern (IUCN 3.1)

Scientific classification
- Kingdom: Animalia
- Phylum: Chordata
- Class: Amphibia
- Order: Anura
- Family: Mantellidae
- Genus: Boophis
- Species: B. albipunctatus

Binomial name
- Boophis albipunctatus Glaw & Thiesmeier, 1993

Species of frog

Boophis albipunctatus is a species of frog in the family Mantellidae. It is endemic to Madagascar. Its natural habitats are subtropical or tropical moist lowland forests and rivers. It is threatened by habitat loss. However, it is not on the endangered list.
