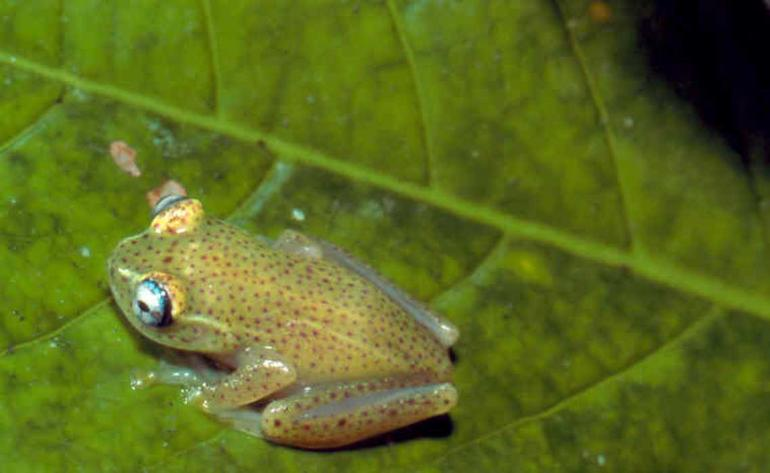

Conservation status
- Least Concern (IUCN 3.1)

Scientific classification
- Kingdom: Animalia
- Phylum: Chordata
- Class: Amphibia
- Order: Anura
- Family: Mantellidae
- Genus: Boophis
- Species: B. tasymena

Binomial name
- Boophis tasymena Vences & Glaw, 2002

= Boophis tasymena =

Species of amphibian

Boophis tasymena is a species of frogs in the family Mantellidae endemic to Madagascar.

Its natural habitats are subtropical or tropical moist lowland forests and rivers. It is threatened by habitat loss.
