= Boophis haematopus =

Conservation status
- Endangered (IUCN 3.1)

Scientific classification
- Kingdom: Animalia
- Phylum: Chordata
- Class: Amphibia
- Order: Anura
- Family: Mantellidae
- Genus: Boophis
- Species: B. haematopus

Binomial name
- Boophis haematopus Glaw, Vences, Andreone & Vallan, 2001

Species of amphibian

Boophis haematopus is a species of frogs in the family Mantellidae.

It is endemic to Madagascar. Its natural habitats are subtropical or tropical moist lowland forests and rivers. It is threatened by habitat loss.
