= Boophis xerophilus =

Conservation status
- Least Concern (IUCN 3.1)

Scientific classification
- Kingdom: Animalia
- Phylum: Chordata
- Class: Amphibia
- Order: Anura
- Family: Mantellidae
- Genus: Boophis
- Species: B. xerophilus

Binomial name
- Boophis xerophilus Glaw & Vences, 1997

Species of frog

Boophis xerophilus is a species of frog in the family Mantellidae endemic to Madagascar, known only from Kirindy Forest in central-western Madagascar and Réserve Naturelle Privée de Berenty in extreme southeastern Madagascar; it may occur more widespread including between the two known locations. Its natural habitats are subtropical or tropical dry forests, moist savanna, and intermittent freshwater marshes. It is threatened by habitat loss for agriculture, timber extraction, charcoal manufacturing, livestock grazing, fires and expanding human settlements.
