= Boophis andrangoloaka =

Conservation status
- Endangered (IUCN 3.1)

Scientific classification
- Kingdom: Animalia
- Phylum: Chordata
- Class: Amphibia
- Order: Anura
- Family: Mantellidae
- Genus: Boophis
- Species: B. andrangoloaka

Binomial name
- Boophis andrangoloaka (Ahl, 1928)

Species of frog

Boophis andrangoloaka is a species of frog in the family Mantellidae. It is endemic to Madagascar.
