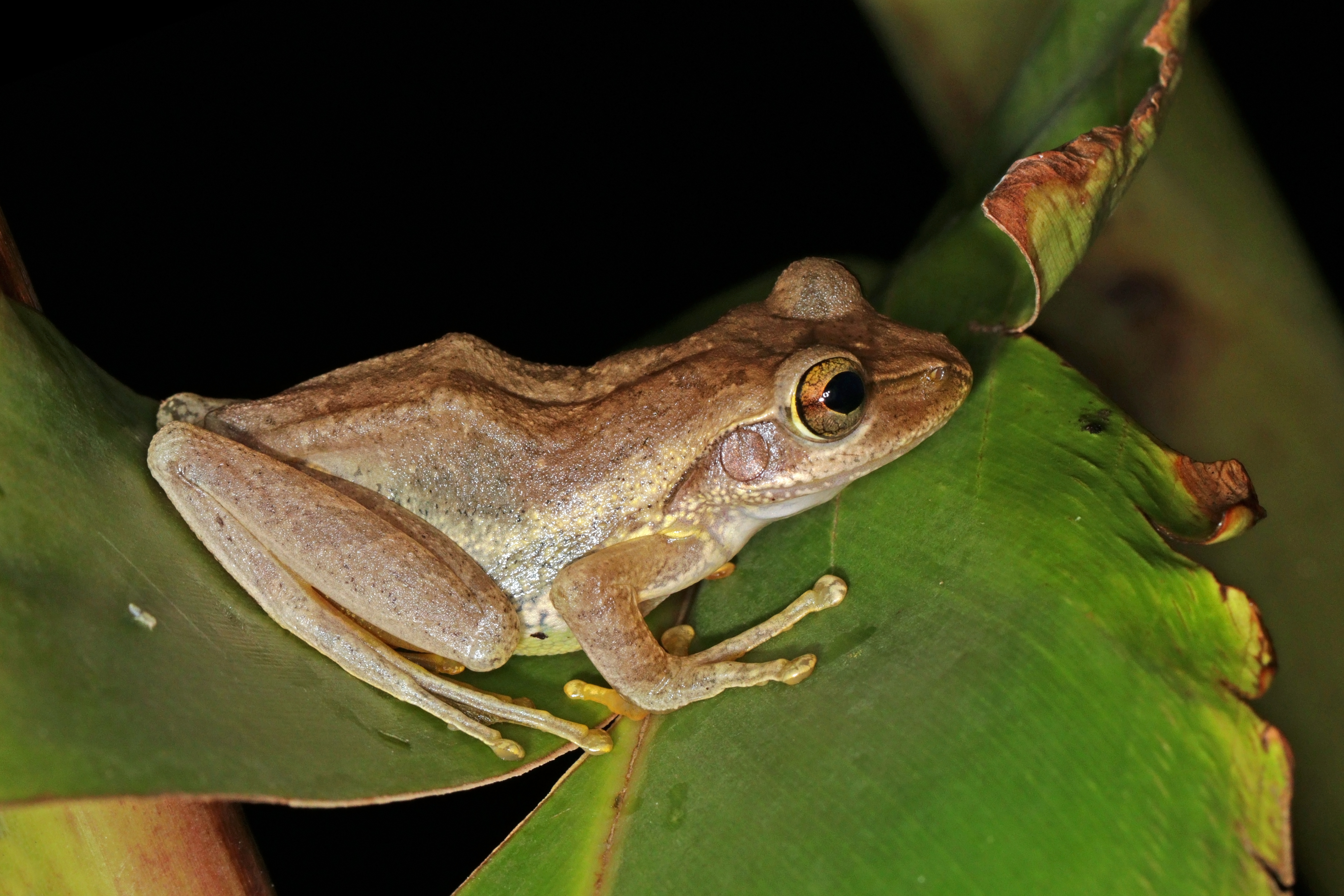
- In Ranomafana National Park

Conservation status
- Least Concern (IUCN 3.1)

Scientific classification
- Kingdom: Animalia
- Phylum: Chordata
- Class: Amphibia
- Order: Anura
- Family: Mantellidae
- Genus: Boophis
- Species: B. tephraeomystax

Binomial name
- Boophis tephraeomystax (A.H.A. Duméril, 1853)

Synonyms
- Boophis difficilis (Boettger, 1892)

= Boophis tephraeomystax =

Species of frog

Dumeril's Bright-Eyed Frog (Boophis tephraeomystax) is a species of frog in the family Mantellidae endemic to Madagascar. Its natural habitats are subtropical or tropical dry forests, subtropical or tropical moist lowland forests, moist savanna, subtropical or tropical moist shrubland, rivers, intermittent freshwater marshes, arable land, urban areas, heavily degraded former forests, and seasonally flooded agricultural land.
