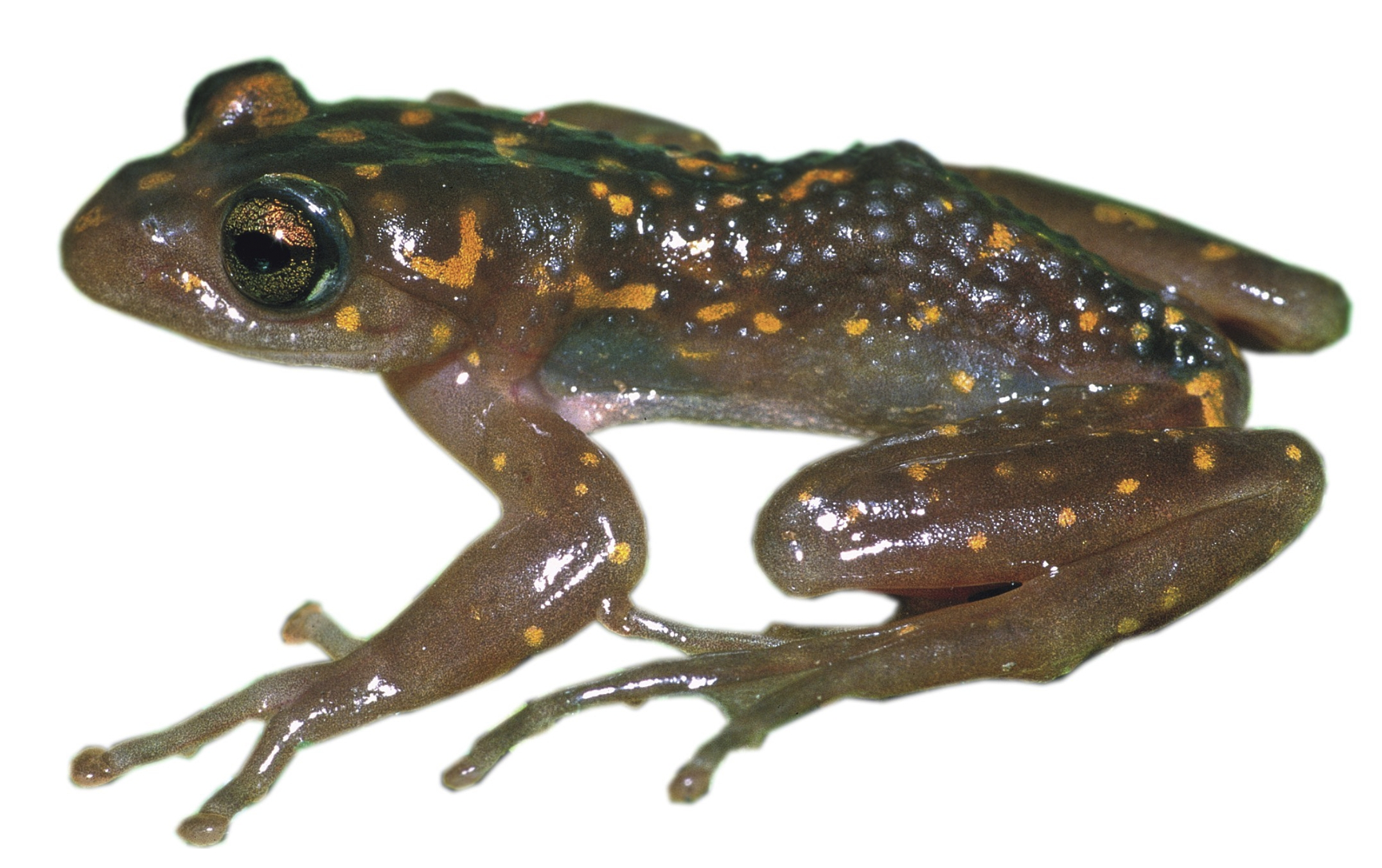

Conservation status
- Critically Endangered (IUCN 3.1)

Scientific classification
- Kingdom: Animalia
- Phylum: Chordata
- Class: Amphibia
- Order: Anura
- Family: Mantellidae
- Genus: Boophis
- Species: B. williamsi

Binomial name
- Boophis williamsi (Guibé, 1974)

= Boophis williamsi =

Species of frog

Boophis williamsi is a species of frog in the family Mantellidae endemic to Madagascar. Its natural habitats are subtropical or tropical moist montane forests, subtropical or tropical high-altitude grassland, rivers, and heavily degraded former forests. It is threatened by habitat loss.
