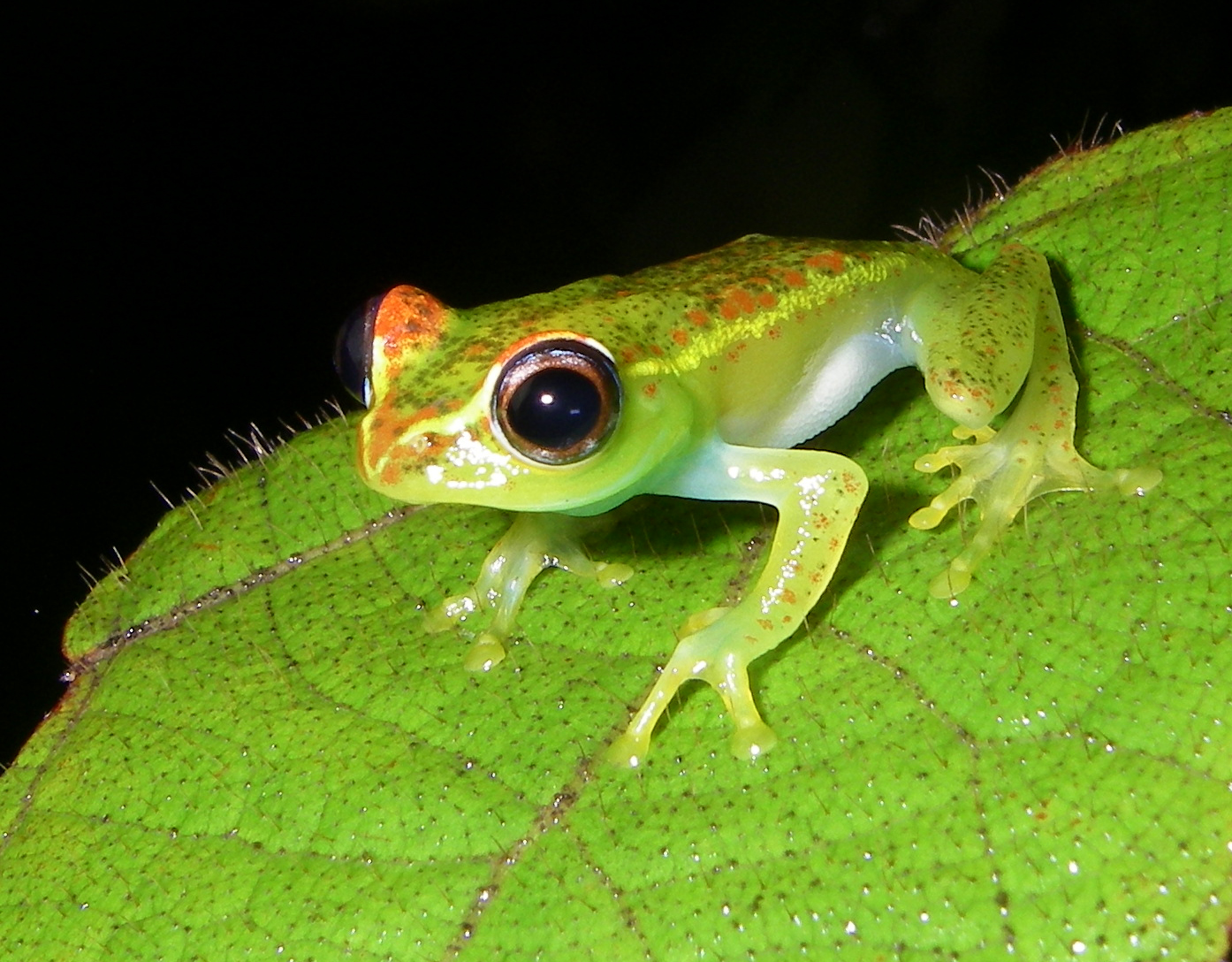

Conservation status
- Least Concern (IUCN 3.1)

Scientific classification
- Kingdom: Animalia
- Phylum: Chordata
- Class: Amphibia
- Order: Anura
- Family: Mantellidae
- Genus: Boophis
- Species: B. rappiodes

Binomial name
- Boophis rappiodes (Ahl, 1928)

Synonyms
- Rhacophorus rappiodes Ahl, 1928

= Boophis rappiodes =

Species of frog

Boophis rappiodes is a species of frog in the family Mantellidae. It is endemic to Madagascar. It occurs in the eastern and southern rainforest belt of Madagascar, living along streams in rainforest. It can also live at the edge of rainforest, but not fully outside the rainforest. It is suffering from loss of its forest habitat.
