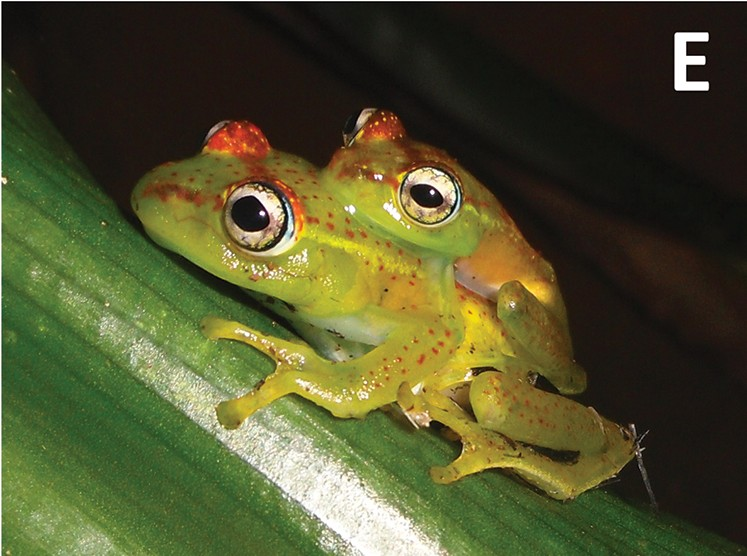
- Boophis ankarafensis couple in axillary amplexus
- Boophis ankarafensis calls

Conservation status
- Critically Endangered (IUCN 3.1)

Scientific classification
- Kingdom: Animalia
- Phylum: Chordata
- Class: Amphibia
- Order: Anura
- Family: Mantellidae
- Genus: Boophis
- Species: B. ankarafensis

Binomial name
- Boophis ankarafensis Penny, Andreone, Crottini, Holderied, Rakotizafy, Schwitzer, and Rosa, 2014
- Distribution of Boophis ankarafensis

= Boophis ankarafensis =

Species of frog

Boophis ankarafensis also known as Ankarafa skeleton frog is a species of frog in the family Mantellidae. It is endemic to Madagascar's northwestern coast where it is only known from Ankarafa Forest, a forest fragment in the Sahamalaza-Iles Radama National Park.

== Description ==
Boophis ankarafensis are small frogs: adult males measure 23–24 mm (0.91–0.94 in) and female (one specimen) 29 mm (1.1 in) in snout–vent length. The body is slender, with the head much wider than the body. The background colour of dorsum and limbs is light green, but the webbing, finger, and toe disks are green-yellow. There are speckles of reddish-brown and yellow pigment covering the dorsum and limbs, and thin yellow dorsolateral stripes running from behind the eye to the forelimb, then fading towards the mid-body. There is some reddish-brown pigment that forms a band between the eyes and covers the supra-ocular area (interspersed with yellow speckling), as well as forming a faint rostral stripe between the eye and nose tip.

== Habitat and conservation ==
Most individuals that have been encountered were males calling along the banks of two streams during nighttime. They were calling from vegetation about 0.5–2 m high, typically close to each other. Most females were observed in amplexing pairs, but one female was found in a tree during the day approximately 3 m high and 30 m from a stream.

Boophis ankarafensis has only been found in intact forest, and it appears to be sensitive to anthropogenic disturbance. The species has not yet been assessed by the International Union for Conservation of Nature, but it is suggested that is should be classified as "Critically Endangered" because the area of occupancy of this species is small (probably less than 10 km²), it is not known from outside the Ankarafa Forest, and this forest fragment is experiencing widespread deforestation.
