= Boophis calcaratus =

Conservation status
- Least Concern (IUCN 3.1)

Scientific classification
- Kingdom: Animalia
- Phylum: Chordata
- Class: Amphibia
- Order: Anura
- Family: Mantellidae
- Genus: Boophis
- Species: B. calcaratus

Binomial name
- Boophis calcaratus Vallan, Vences & Glaw, 2010

Species of amphibian

Boophis calcaratus (sometimes called the bright-eyed frog) is a species of treefrog found in Madagascar. It has large tubercles on its heels, especially noticeable in females, that distinguish it from most other Boophis species; it is distinguished among the tubercle-bearing Boophis by the lack of webbing on its hands.
