= Boophis ulftunni =

Conservation status
- Vulnerable (IUCN 3.1)

Scientific classification
- Kingdom: Animalia
- Phylum: Chordata
- Class: Amphibia
- Order: Anura
- Family: Mantellidae
- Genus: Boophis
- Species: B. ulftunni

Binomial name
- Boophis ulftunni Wollenberg, Andreone, Glaw & Vences, 2008

Species of amphibian

Boophis ulftunni is a species of frogs in the family Mantellidae. It is endemic to Madagascar.
