= Boophis miniatus =

Conservation status
- Vulnerable (IUCN 3.1)

Scientific classification
- Kingdom: Animalia
- Phylum: Chordata
- Class: Amphibia
- Order: Anura
- Family: Mantellidae
- Genus: Boophis
- Species: B. miniatus

Binomial name
- Boophis miniatus (Mocquard, 1902)

Synonyms
- Rhacophorus miniatus Mocquard, 1902

Species of frog

Boophis miniatus, also known as the tiny bright-eyed frog, is a species of frog in the family Mantellidae. It is endemic to Madagascar. It is found in the rainforest belt of southeastern Madagascar at elevations of 300–800 m (980–2,620 ft) above sea level. It occurs in both pristine and degraded rainforest, and can also been found in open areas not far from forest. Breeding takes place in streams. It a reasonably common species.
