= Boophis mandraka =

Conservation status
- Critically Endangered (IUCN 3.1)

Scientific classification
- Kingdom: Animalia
- Phylum: Chordata
- Class: Amphibia
- Order: Anura
- Family: Mantellidae
- Genus: Boophis
- Species: B. mandraka

Binomial name
- Boophis mandraka Blommers-Schlösser, 1979

Species of frog

The mandraka bright-eyed frog (Boophis mandraka) is a species of frog in the family Mantellidae. It is endemic to Madagascar, officially known only from Mandraka Park with unconfirmed records in Andohahela National Park, Ambatovaky Reserve, Anjanaharibe-Sud Reserve and Andasibe-Mantadia National Park. Its natural habitats are subtropical or tropical moist montane forests, rivers, and heavily degraded former forest. It is threatened by habitat loss for agriculture, timber extraction, charcoal manufacturing, invasive eucalyptus, livestock grazing and expanding human settlement.
