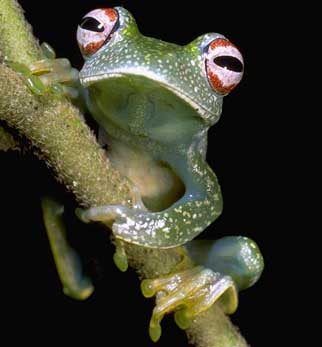

Conservation status
- Endangered (IUCN 3.1)

Scientific classification
- Kingdom: Animalia
- Phylum: Chordata
- Class: Amphibia
- Order: Anura
- Family: Mantellidae
- Genus: Boophis
- Species: B. anjanaharibeensis

Binomial name
- Boophis anjanaharibeensis Andreone, 1996

= Boophis anjanaharibeensis =

Species of frog

Boophis anjanaharibeensis is a species of frog in the family Mantellidae.

It is endemic to Madagascar, officially known only from Anjanaharibe-Sud Special Reserve and unofficially from other areas including Marojejy National Park. Its natural habitats are subtropical or tropical moist lowland forests, subtropical or tropical moist montane forests, and rivers.

It is threatened by habitat loss for agriculture, timber extraction, charcoal manufacturing, invasive eucalyptus, livestock grazing and expanding human settlements.
