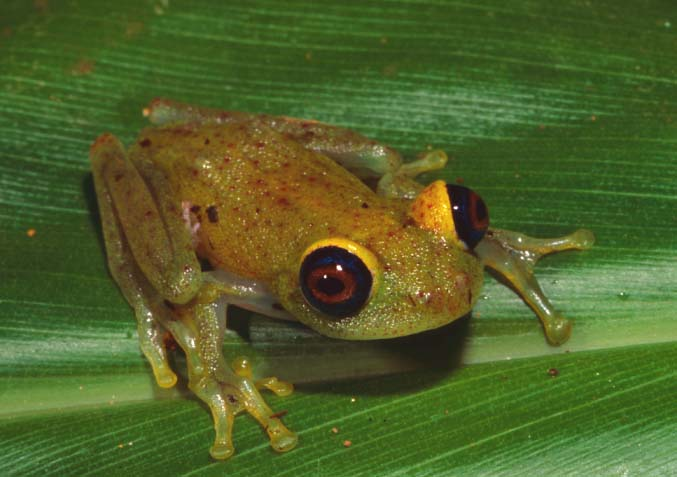

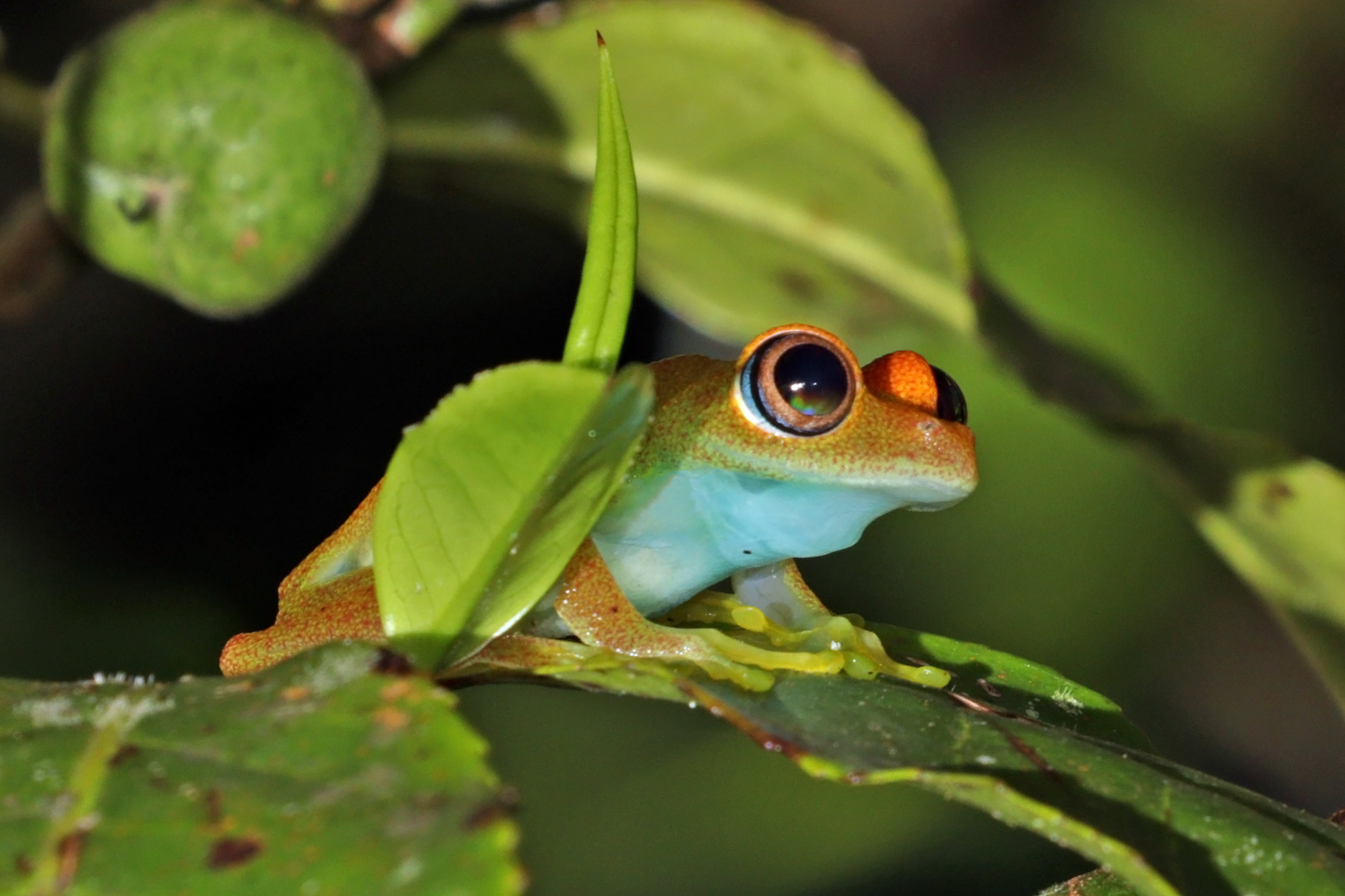

Conservation status
- Least Concern (IUCN 3.1)

Scientific classification
- Kingdom: Animalia
- Phylum: Chordata
- Class: Amphibia
- Order: Anura
- Family: Mantellidae
- Genus: Boophis
- Species: B. viridis

Binomial name
- Boophis viridis Blommers-Schlösser, 1979

= Green bright-eyed frog =

Species of amphibian

The green bright-eyed frog (Boophis viridis) is a species of frog in the family Mantellidae. It is endemic to Madagascar.

== Description ==
The average size of the males reaches 29–30 millimetres (1.1–1.2 in), while the females can grow to about 32–35 millimetres (1.3–1.4 in). The hands and feet are webbed. Their dorsal skin is smooth and green in color, sometimes with reddish spots, as well. They also have the ability to change colors and become more reddish brown. Their inner and outer irises are blue.

== Reproduction ==
Males call at night while in vegetation about 1–2 metres above the ground, along streams, and also by ditches. When the weather is dry, a calling green bright-eyed frog has also been found up as high as 5 m. The calls are a combination of two inharmonious note types that include a long note repeated in short pulses and a shorter note consisting of three repeated notes.

Breeding takes place in streams. One pair of frogs can have as many as 154 dark-brown eggs.

== Population ==
The species is not currently threatened. The reasons for possible decrease in population include:

- General habitat alteration and loss
- Habitat modification from deforestation, or logging-related activities
- Intensified agriculture or grazing
- Urbanization
- Habitat fragmentation
