= Boophis laurenti =

Conservation status
- Endangered (IUCN 3.1)

Scientific classification
- Kingdom: Animalia
- Phylum: Chordata
- Class: Amphibia
- Order: Anura
- Family: Mantellidae
- Genus: Boophis
- Species: B. laurenti

Binomial name
- Boophis laurenti Guibé, 1947

Species of frog

Boophis laurenti is a species of frog in the family Mantellidae. It is endemic to Madagascar, known only from Andringitra National Park. Its natural habitats are subtropical or tropical moist montane forests, subtropical or tropical high-altitude shrubland, subtropical or tropical high-altitude grassland, and rivers. It is threatened by habitat loss for fires and livestock grazing.
