= Boophis erythrodactylus =

Conservation status
- Least Concern (IUCN 3.1)

Scientific classification
- Kingdom: Animalia
- Phylum: Chordata
- Class: Amphibia
- Order: Anura
- Family: Mantellidae
- Genus: Boophis
- Species: B. erythrodactylus

Binomial name
- Boophis erythrodactylus (Guibé, 1953)

Species of amphibian

Boophis erythrodactylus is a species of frogs in the family Mantellidae.

It is endemic to Madagascar.

Its natural habitats are subtropical or tropical moist lowland forests, subtropical or tropical moist montane forests, and rivers.

It is threatened by habitat loss.
