= Boophis liami =

Conservation status
- Critically Endangered (IUCN 3.1)

Scientific classification
- Kingdom: Animalia
- Phylum: Chordata
- Class: Amphibia
- Order: Anura
- Family: Mantellidae
- Genus: Boophis
- Species: B. liami

Binomial name
- Boophis liami Vallan, Vences & Glaw, 2003

Species of amphibian

Boophis liami is a species of frogs in the family Mantellidae.

It is endemic to Madagascar, currently known only from Forêt de Vohidrazana and Andasibe-Mantadia National Park but may exist more widespread. Its natural habitats are subtropical or tropical moist lowland forests, rivers, and heavily degraded former forest. It is threatened by habitat loss for agriculture, timber extraction, charcoal manufacturing, invasive eucalyptus, livestock grazing and expanding human settlement.
