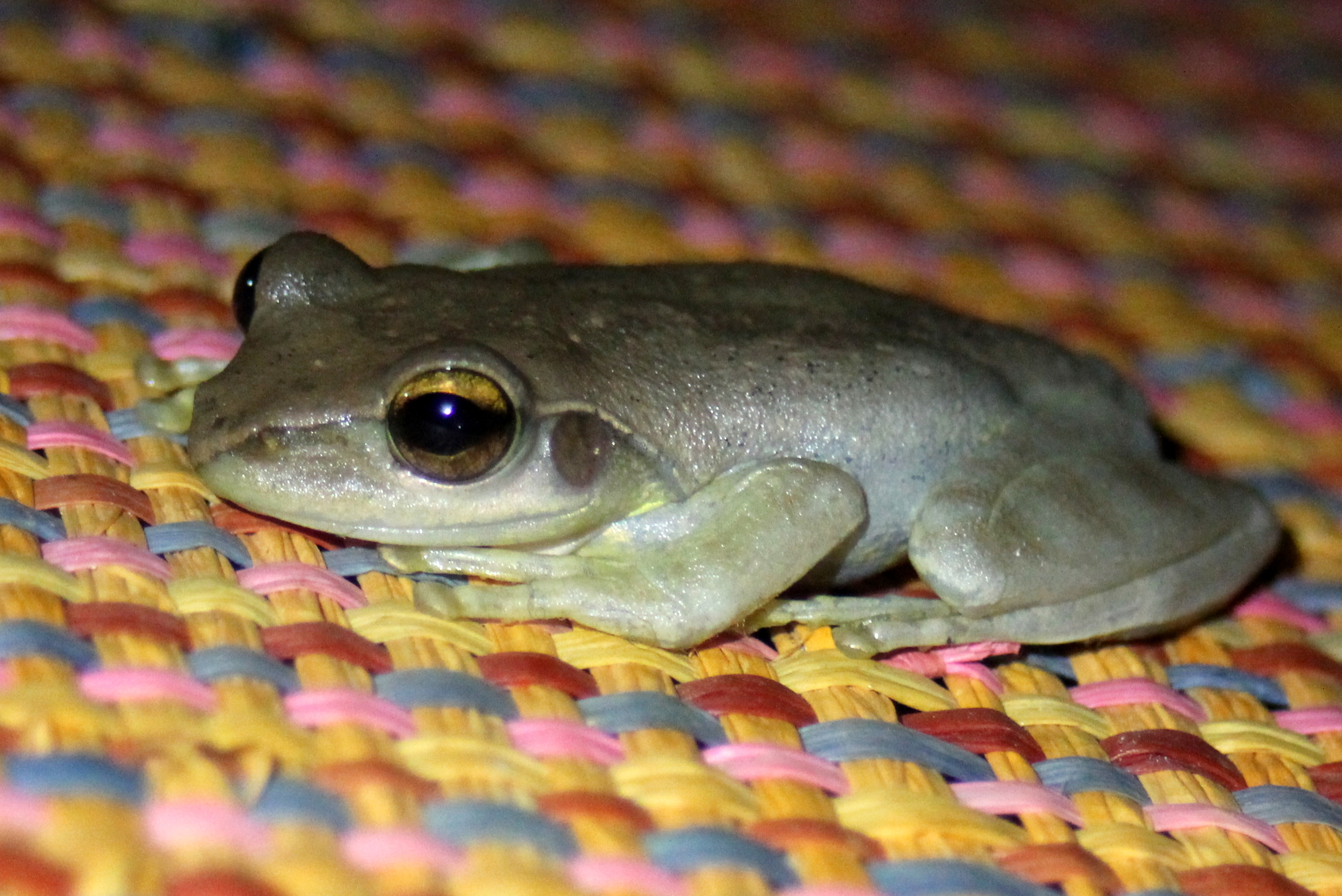

Conservation status
- Least Concern (IUCN 3.1)

Scientific classification
- Kingdom: Animalia
- Phylum: Chordata
- Class: Amphibia
- Order: Anura
- Family: Mantellidae
- Genus: Boophis
- Species: B. doulioti

Binomial name
- Boophis doulioti (Angel, 1934)

= Boophis doulioti =

Species of frog

Boophis doulioti is a species of frog in the family Mantellidae. It is endemic to Madagascar. Its natural habitats are subtropical or tropical dry forests, dry savanna, moist savanna, subtropical or tropical dry shrubland, subtropical or tropical moist shrubland, swamps, intermittent freshwater marshes, pastureland, seasonally flooded agricultural land, and canals and ditches.
