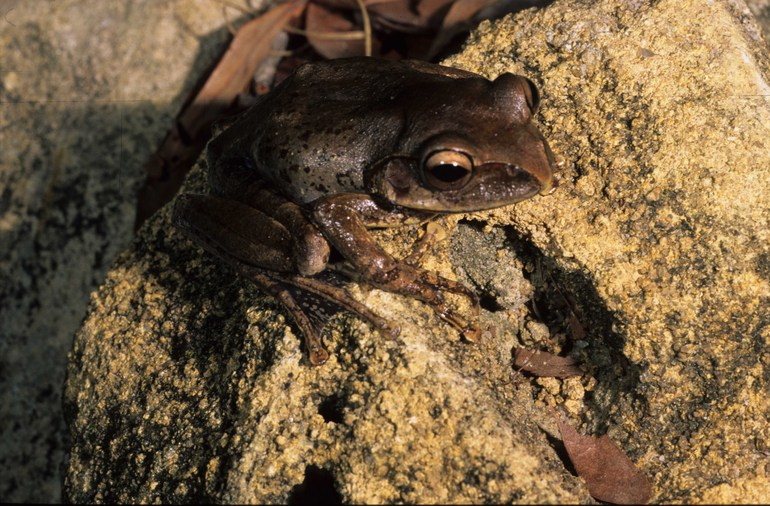

Conservation status
- Near Threatened (IUCN 3.1)

Scientific classification
- Kingdom: Animalia
- Phylum: Chordata
- Class: Amphibia
- Order: Anura
- Family: Mantellidae
- Genus: Boophis
- Species: B. periegetes

Binomial name
- Boophis periegetes Cadle, 1995

= Boophis periegetes =

Species of amphibian

Boophis periegetes is a species of frogs in the family Mantellidae.

It is endemic to Madagascar, officially known only from Ranomafana National Park with unconfirmed records in Andohahela National Park, Andringitra National Park and Kalambatritra Reserve. Its natural habitats are subtropical or tropical moist lowland forests, subtropical or tropical moist montane forests, and rivers. It is threatened by habitat loss for agriculture, timber extraction, charcoal manufacturing, invasive eucalyptus, livestock grazing and expanding human settlement.
