= Boophis solomaso =

Conservation status
- Endangered (IUCN 3.1)

Scientific classification
- Kingdom: Animalia
- Phylum: Chordata
- Class: Amphibia
- Order: Anura
- Family: Mantellidae
- Genus: Boophis
- Species: B. solomaso

Binomial name
- Boophis solomaso Vallan, Vences & Glaw, 2003

Species of amphibian

Boophis solomaso is a species of frogs in the family Mantellidae endemic to Madagascar, known only from Forêt de Vohidrazana but it may occur more widespread.

Its natural habitats are subtropical or tropical moist lowland forests and rivers. It is threatened by habitat loss for agriculture, timber extraction, charcoal manufacturing, invasive eucalyptus, livestock grazing and expanding human settlement.
