= Boophis samuelsabini =

Conservation status
- Endangered (IUCN 3.1)

Scientific classification
- Kingdom: Animalia
- Phylum: Chordata
- Class: Amphibia
- Order: Anura
- Family: Mantellidae
- Genus: Boophis
- Species: B. samuelsabini

Binomial name
- Boophis samuelsabini Basham, Masotti, Jimenez, Razafitsimialona, Andrianatenaina, Rakotoarison, Glaw, Wright, Vences, 2026

Species of frog

Boophis samuelsabini is a species of frog in the family Mantellidae. It is endemic to Ivohiboro protected area in Madagascar. Its natural habitats are subtropical or tropical dry forests, subtropical or tropical moist lowland forests, swamps, freshwater marshes, intermittent freshwater marshes, and heavily degraded former forest. The species was founded in 2-26.
