= Boophis vittatus =

Conservation status
- Vulnerable (IUCN 3.1)

Scientific classification
- Kingdom: Animalia
- Phylum: Chordata
- Class: Amphibia
- Order: Anura
- Family: Mantellidae
- Genus: Boophis
- Species: B. vittatus

Binomial name
- Boophis vittatus Glaw, Vences, Andreone & Vallan, 2001

Species of amphibian

Boophis vittatus is a species of frogs in the family Mantellidae.

It is endemic to Madagascar. Its natural habitats are subtropical or tropical moist lowland forests, subtropical or tropical moist montane forests, and rivers. It is threatened by habitat loss.
