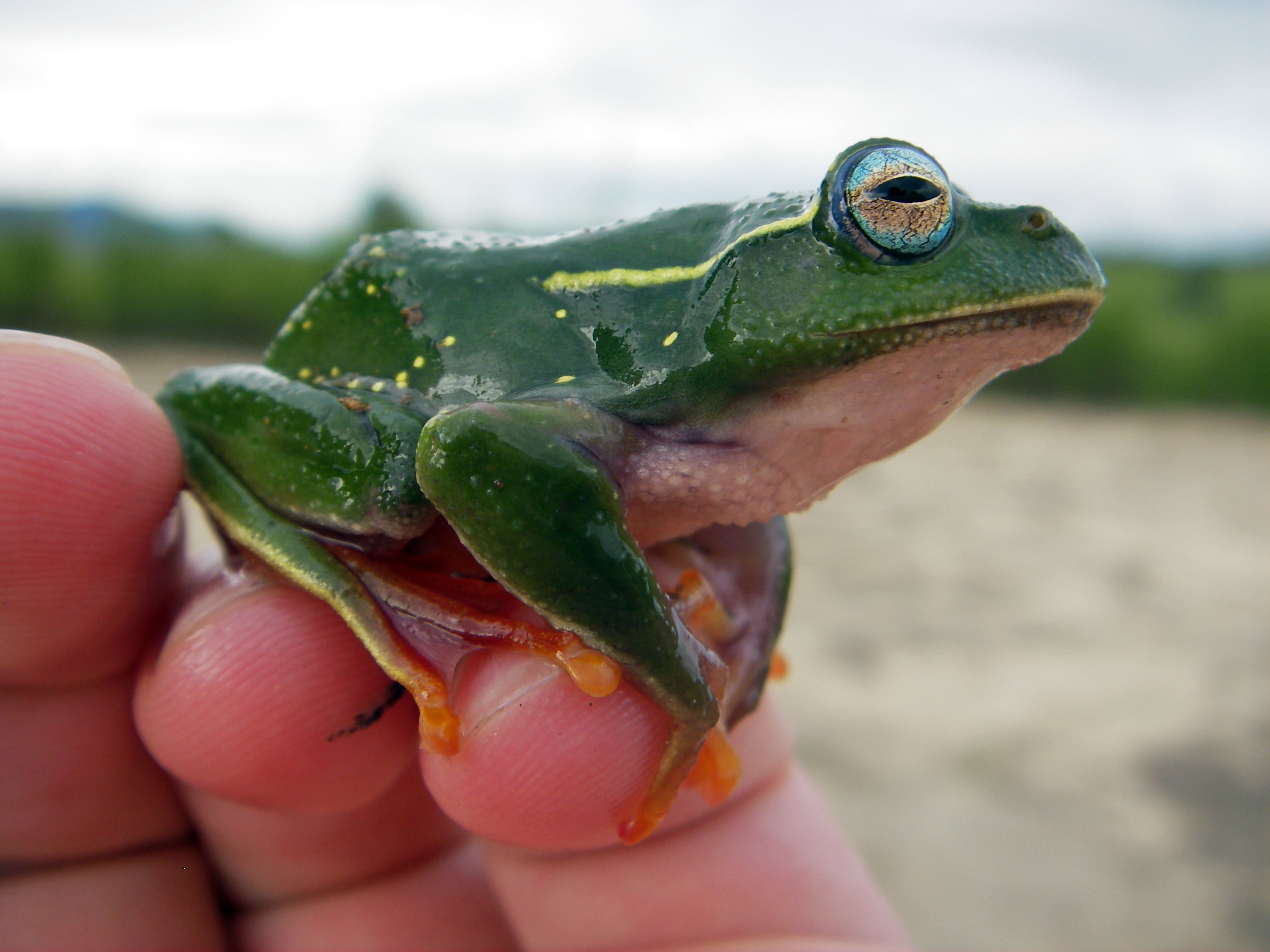

Conservation status
- Least Concern (IUCN 3.1)

Scientific classification
- Kingdom: Animalia
- Phylum: Chordata
- Class: Amphibia
- Order: Anura
- Family: Mantellidae
- Genus: Boophis
- Species: B. occidentalis

Binomial name
- Boophis occidentalis Glaw & Vences, 1994

= Boophis occidentalis =

Species of frog

Boophis occidentalis is a species of frog in the family Mantellidae. It is endemic to Madagascar. Its natural habitats are subtropical or tropical dry forests, rivers, pastureland, urban areas, and heavily degraded former forest. It is threatened by habitat loss.

ADULT LIFE

Morphology:

Adult specimens typically have mean snout-vent lengths of 55.3 ±3.3 mm and mean weights of 10.9 ±1.8 grams. Male adults in breeding conditions have cornified pointed spiculae on their heads and bodies. They have well-developed nuptial pads with enlarged prepollex on the distal phalanx of finger I. Cloacal openings are displayed ventrally and extend anteriorly below the thighs.

Females have smoother skin without keratinized parts and a soft non distally oriented prepollex. Cloacal openings on females are mid-level of the thighs and have short dorsal covering flaps.

Coloration:

There are two color-morphs distinguished for the Boophis Occidentalis species: almost uniformly light green dorsally or brownish coloration with shadings of olive green dorsally. Both morphs are yellowish ventrally with the inner part of the legs being reddish. Brown specimens are more common than green specimens.

In green the dorsal surface is green with flanks that are lighter with pinkish to whitish shading towards the ventral side. Small light greenish-white spots are present on the posterior parts of the flank anterior to the groin. Upper parts of the hands and feet are yellow-ish. Both sexes have yellowish-whitish upper lips and webbing between the toes that are red to purple shaded. The iris is bronze-yellow or golden-yellow with a light blue periphery.

In brown specimens the flanks are lighter than the back and the reddish webbing of the feet is less bright. Some coloration differences in sexes: In green males the area between dorsolateral folds appears darker than females due to blackish spiculae being present. Supra-ocular yellowish stripes are visible on females but not males due to lack of spiculae obscuring them.

Tadpole morphology

Snout-vent-length (SVL) of metamorphs is 20–30 mm. SVL in adults is 50–65 mm, giving metamorphs already 457-60% of adult SVL. Reasoning for this can be explained by B. occidentalis adaptation to arid environments of Madagascar. Larger size at metamorphosis allows for a better ability to feed on larger prey and less energy needs to be invested to reach sexual maturity. B. occidentalis is primarily live along permanent rivers which allows for longer larvae period and therefore allows metamorphs to reach larger size because of the lower evo-transpiration rate.

BREEDING BEHAVIOR

Males aggregate in spaced out choruses after sunset into late night in shallow slow-moving pools along the edges of streams. Males located in water, and less often the ones in trees, emit a low-frequency ‘rumbling’ vocalization. Males influence each other's calling behaviors and often neighboring males alternate in their calls. Males in water engage in scramble battles before mating.

Reproduction is synchronous in the B. occidentalis species. When females arrive and are fully submerged they are immediately clasped by males. Pairs of males and females are often amplected by several additional males. Males keep their cloaca closely adpressed to the female's cloaca and egg deposition occurs seconds after mating. Eggs immediately attach in a single layer to surrounding submerged stones. Eggs are around 2.2-2.5 mm in diameter and are initially black with a large white pole immediately after oviposition, but gastrulate and become fully black within a few hours.

VOCALIZATION

Calls of the male Boophis occidentalis are emitted at irregular intervals and are composed of unharmonious notes with no clearly arranged regular series. Notes are composed of 26-34 pulses and each note is 262-362 ms long. The duration of note pulses is 3-5 ms with intervals of 4-8 ms in between. The last pulse of notes is more intense, harmonious, sounds ‘click’ like and is longer than a normal pulse with a duration of 5-18 ms. Pulse repetition rate is 90-109 pulses/second with a frequency of 900–200 Hz. Boophis occidentalis calls are similar to species Boophis albilabriscalls. Major differences between calls are B. albilabris notes are composed of less pulses with each note duration being longer Pulse duration is similar but has longer intervals between pulses. B. albilabris exhibit a different ‘click’ pulse that is more isolated and longer. Pulse repetition is shorter and frequency of notes are higher.

== Sources ==
- Glaw, F., Vences, M. & Cadle, J. 2004. Boophis occidentalis 2006 IUCN Red List of Threatened Species. Downloaded on 23 July 2007.
- Andreone, F., Vences, M., Guarino, F.M., Glaw, F. & J.E. Randrianirina (2002): Natural history and larval morphology of Boophis occidentalis (Anura: Mantellidae: Boophinae) provide new insights into the phylogeny and adaptive radiation of endemic Malagasy frogs). – J. Zool., 257: 425–438.
- Andreone, F., Mercurio, V., Mattioli, F. & Razafindrabe, T.J. (2007) Size at metamorphosis of Boophis occcidentalis Glaw & Vences, 1994 in an arid environment of central-southern Madagascar. Salamandra, 43, 119–121.
