= Boophis baetkei =

Conservation status
- Critically Endangered (IUCN 3.1)

Scientific classification
- Kingdom: Animalia
- Phylum: Chordata
- Class: Amphibia
- Order: Anura
- Family: Mantellidae
- Genus: Boophis
- Species: B. baetkei

Binomial name
- Boophis baetkei Köhler, Glaw & Vences, 2008

Species of frog

Boophis baetkei is a species of frog in the family Mantellidae. It is endemic to northern Madagascar and only known from its type locality on the eastern edge of the Fôret d'Ambre Special Reserve in the Antsiranana Province. It is an arboreal species that was found in a heavily disturbed transitional forest (characterized also as relatively dry rainforest). It is threatened by severe habitat loss occurring in the area of its type locality.
