= Boophis microtympanum =

Conservation status
- Least Concern (IUCN 3.1)

Scientific classification
- Kingdom: Animalia
- Phylum: Chordata
- Class: Amphibia
- Order: Anura
- Family: Mantellidae
- Genus: Boophis
- Species: B. microtympanum

Binomial name
- Boophis microtympanum (Boettger, 1881)

Species of frog

Boophis microtympanum is a species of frog in the family Mantellidae.

It is endemic to Madagascar. Its natural habitats are subtropical or tropical moist montane forests, moist savanna, subtropical or tropical high-altitude grassland, rivers, and heavily degraded former forest. It is threatened by habitat loss.
