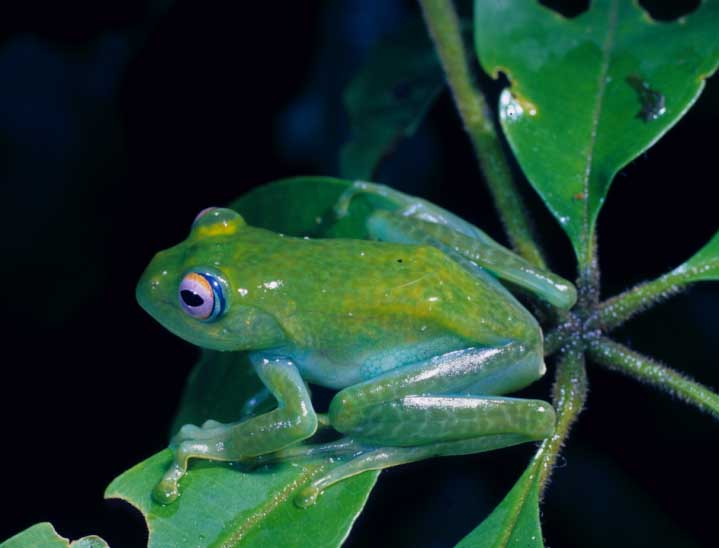

Conservation status
- Vulnerable (IUCN 3.1)

Scientific classification
- Kingdom: Animalia
- Phylum: Chordata
- Class: Amphibia
- Order: Anura
- Family: Mantellidae
- Genus: Boophis
- Species: B. andreonei

Binomial name
- Boophis andreonei Glaw & Vences, 1994

= Boophis andreonei =

Species of frog

Boophis andreonei is a species of frog in the family Mantellidae. It is endemic to Madagascar. Its natural habitats are subtropical or tropical moist lowland forests and rivers, at 200 to 700 m (660 to 2,300 ft). It is threatened by habitat loss.
