= Boophis pauliani =

Conservation status
- Least Concern (IUCN 3.1)

Scientific classification
- Kingdom: Animalia
- Phylum: Chordata
- Class: Amphibia
- Order: Anura
- Family: Mantellidae
- Genus: Boophis
- Species: B. pauliani

Binomial name
- Boophis pauliani (Guibé, 1953)

Species of amphibian

Boophis pauliani is a species of frogs in the family Mantellidae.

It is endemic to Madagascar.

Its natural habitats are subtropical or tropical moist lowland forests, subtropical or tropical moist montane forests, rivers, swamps, intermittent freshwater marshes, arable land, pastureland, and heavily degraded former forest.

It is threatened by habitat loss.
