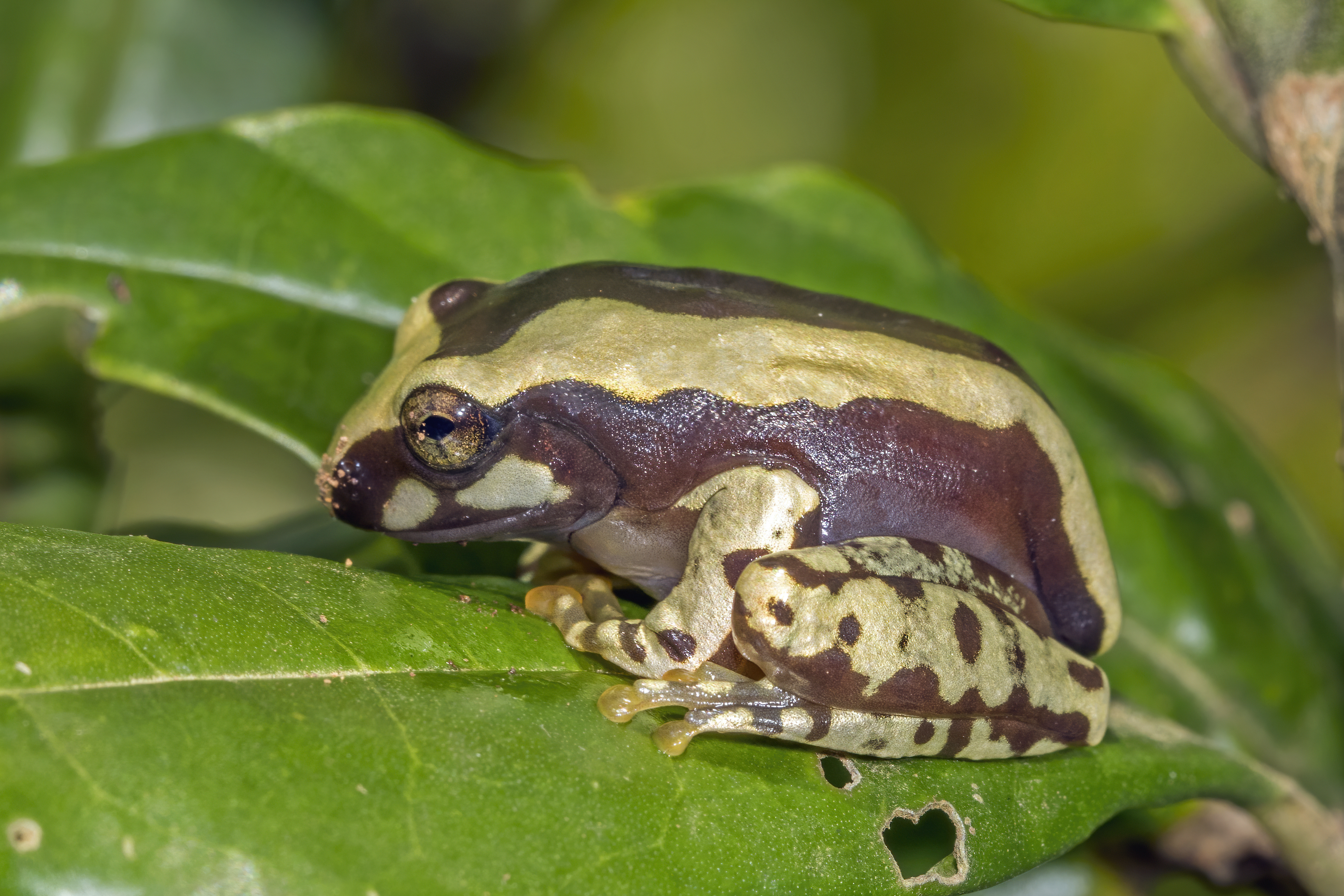

Conservation status
- Least Concern (IUCN 3.1)

Scientific classification
- Kingdom: Animalia
- Phylum: Chordata
- Class: Amphibia
- Order: Anura
- Family: Mantellidae
- Genus: Boophis
- Species: B. picturatus

Binomial name
- Boophis picturatus Glaw, Vences, Andreone & Vallan, 2001

= Boophis picturatus =

Species of amphibian

Boophis picturatus is a frog species in the family Mantellidae. It is endemic to Madagascar.

Its natural habitats are subtropical or tropical moist lowland forests and rivers. It is not considered threatened by the IUCN.
