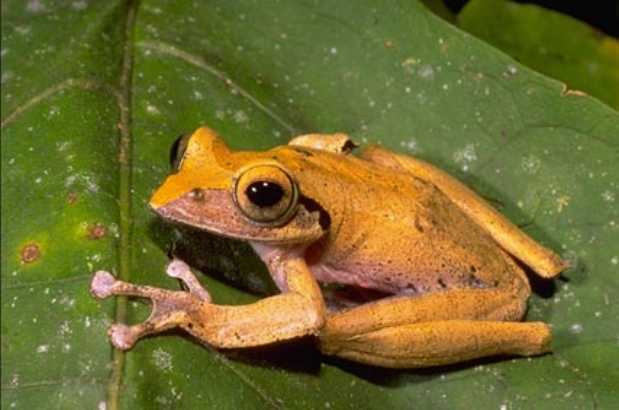

Conservation status
- Vulnerable (IUCN 3.1)

Scientific classification
- Kingdom: Animalia
- Phylum: Chordata
- Class: Amphibia
- Order: Anura
- Family: Mantellidae
- Genus: Boophis
- Species: B. brachychir

Binomial name
- Boophis brachychir (Boettger, 1882)

= Boophis brachychir =

Species of frog

Boophis brachychir is a species of frog in the family Mantellidae.

It is endemic to Madagascar. Its natural habitats are subtropical or tropical dry forests, subtropical or tropical moist lowland forests, subtropical or tropical moist montane forests, moist savanna, rivers, and heavily degraded former forest. It is threatened by habitat loss for agriculture, timber extraction, charcoal manufacturing, invasive eucalyptus, livestock grazing, fire and expanding human settlements. It is often confused with Boophis madagascariensis. No conservations measures are known but it occurs in protected areas.

== Sources ==
- Andreone, F., Vences, M. & Glaw, F. 2004. Boophis brachychir 2006 IUCN Red List of Threatened Species. Downloaded on 23 July 2007.
