= Boophis tampoka =

Conservation status
- Least Concern (IUCN 3.1)

Scientific classification
- Kingdom: Animalia
- Phylum: Chordata
- Class: Amphibia
- Order: Anura
- Family: Mantellidae
- Genus: Boophis
- Species: B. tampoka

Binomial name
- Boophis tampoka Köhler, Glaw & Vences, 2007

Species of amphibian

Boophis tampoka is a species of frogs in the family Mantellidae. It is endemic to Madagascar.
