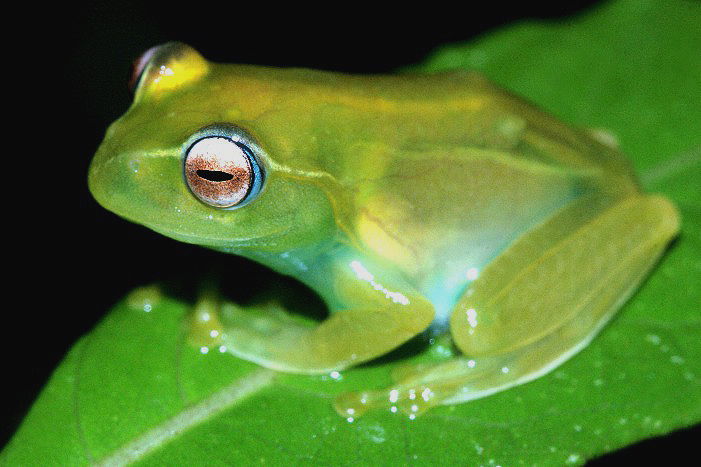

Conservation status
- Least Concern (IUCN 3.1)

Scientific classification
- Kingdom: Animalia
- Phylum: Chordata
- Class: Amphibia
- Order: Anura
- Family: Mantellidae
- Genus: Boophis
- Species: B. ankaratra

Binomial name
- Boophis ankaratra Andreone, 1993

= Boophis ankaratra =

Species of frog

Boophis ankaratra is a species of frog in the family Mantellidae. It is endemic to Madagascar. Its natural habitats are subtropical or tropical moist montane forests, rivers, pastureland, rural gardens, and heavily degraded former forest. It is threatened by habitat loss.
