= Boophis axelmeyeri =

Conservation status
- Least Concern (IUCN 3.1)

Scientific classification
- Kingdom: Animalia
- Phylum: Chordata
- Class: Amphibia
- Order: Anura
- Family: Mantellidae
- Genus: Boophis
- Species: B. axelmeyeri

Binomial name
- Boophis axelmeyeri Vences, Andreone & Vietes, 2005

Species of amphibian

Boophis axelmeyeri is a species of frogs in the family Mantellidae. It is endemic to Madagascar.

It is named after the evolutionary biologist and zoologist Axel Meyer.
