= Boophis schuboeae =

Conservation status
- Endangered (IUCN 3.1)

Scientific classification
- Kingdom: Animalia
- Phylum: Chordata
- Class: Amphibia
- Order: Anura
- Family: Mantellidae
- Genus: Boophis
- Species: B. schuboeae

Binomial name
- Boophis schuboeae Glaw & Vences, 2002

Species of frog

Boophis schuboeae is a species of frog in the family Mantellidae.

It is endemic to Madagascar, known only from Ranomafana National Park but it may occur more widespread.

Its natural habitats are subtropical or tropical moist lowland forests and rivers. It is threatened by habitat loss for agriculture, timber extraction, charcoal manufacturing, invasive eucalyptus, livestock grazing and expanding human settlement.
