= Jörn Köhler =

German herpetologist

Jörn Köhler (born 23 June 1970 in Göttingen) is a German herpetologist. He studied biology at the University of Bonn and received a Ph.D. in zoology in 2000, being associated with the Zoologische Forschungsmuseum Alexander Koenig, Bonn. His main research focus is on taxonomy, systematics, phylogeny, biogeography and ecology of tropical amphibians and reptiles, mainly in South America and Africa. He is the founder of BIOPAT in 1999. From 2007 to 2013 he was member of the steering committee of the German Herpetological Society (DGHT) and is Chief Editor of SALAMANDRA - German Journal of Herpetology. Since 2005, he has worked as researcher and curator for vertebrate zoology at the Hessisches Landesmuseum Darmstadt and has published articles in various scientific journals.
