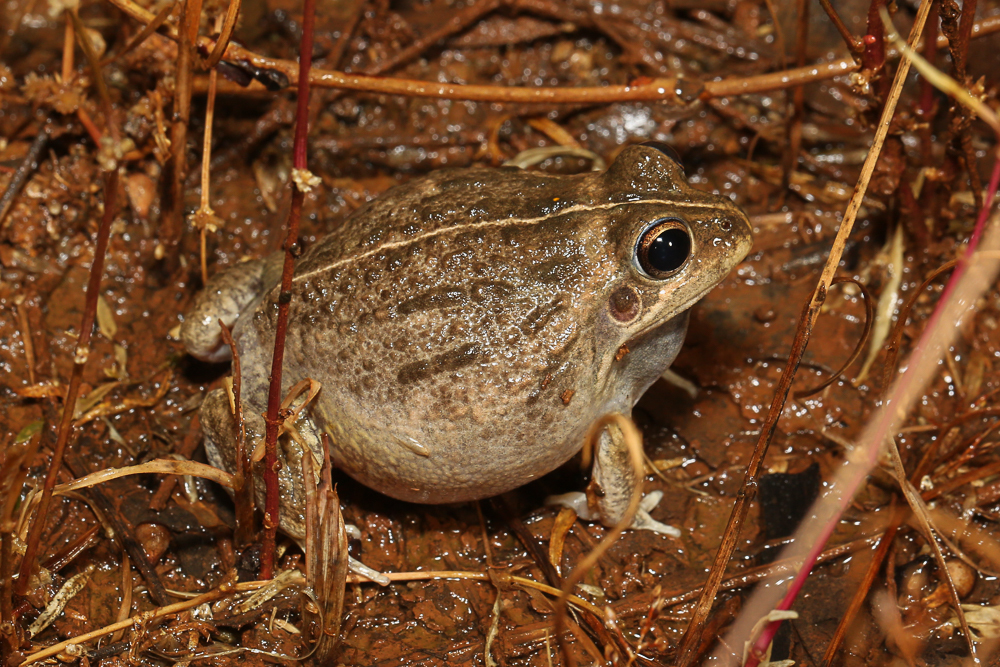

Conservation status
- Least Concern (IUCN 3.1)

Scientific classification
- Kingdom: Animalia
- Phylum: Chordata
- Class: Amphibia
- Order: Anura
- Family: Pelodryadidae
- Genus: Cyclorana
- Species: C. cultripes

Binomial name
- Cyclorana cultripes Parker, 1940
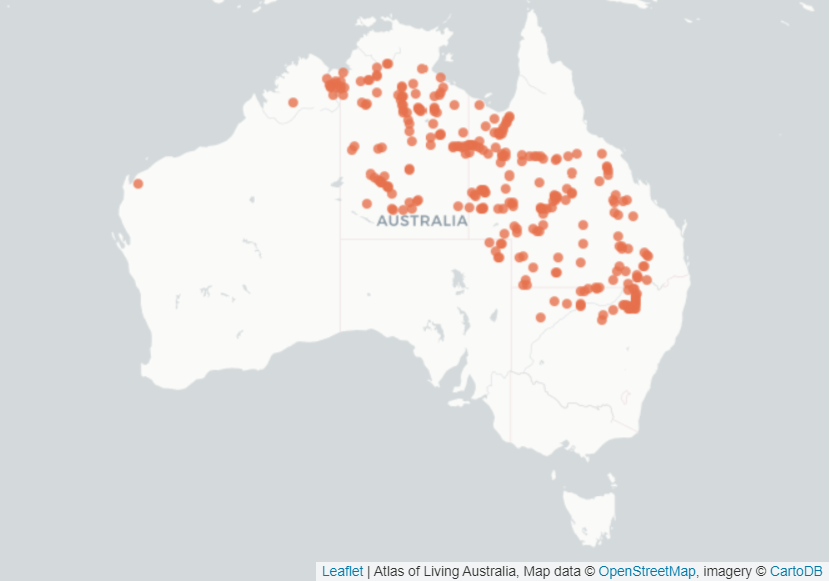
- Range map

Synonyms
- List: Cyclorana cultripes Parker, 1940; Litoria cultripes (Parker, 1940); Dryopsophus cultripes (Parker, 1940); Ranoidea cultripes (Parker, 1940)

= Knife-footed frog =

Species of amphibian

The knife-footed frog (Cyclorana cultripes) is a species of burrowing frog in the family Hylidae. It is endemic to Australia, where it is found over a wide area in the north of the continent.

== Description ==
The knife-footed frog is of moderate to stout stature and can be grey to grey-brown to olive-brown or green in colouration with irregular patches. A pale thin stripe starts at the tip of its snout and extends lengthways along its spine. Behind the eyes it has a broad pale bar. A streak of colouration that is faint to strong extends from the corner of the eye down to merge with side patterns. The upper lip is brown along its edge with flecks of white. The back of the thighs and groin are light grey-brown in colouration with white mottling. The underside is mostly white.

The back of the knife-footed frog is smooth or slightly warty. Both sexes have a coarsely granular belly, but males have a finely granular throat whereas female throats are smooth. Its fingers are unwebbed and about one-third to half of its toes are webbed,. Neither its fingers nor toes have discs. Females (38–43 mm) are slightly larger than males (38–41 mm).

The knife-footed frog shares its range with two similar species – the rough frog (Cyclorana verrucosa) and Main's frog (Cyclorana maini). The knife-footed frog can be distinguished from the rough frog by the smoother skin on its back where the rough frog has slightly to extremely warty skin. The knife-footed frog also lacks the dark lateral head stripe of Main's frog.

== Taxonomy ==
The species was initially described by Parker in 1940 as Cyclorana cultripes.. The genus was briefly classified in Litoria, Dryopsophus and Ranoidea, but a systematic phylogenetic study in 2025 reinstated Cyclorana as the genus.

== Distribution ==
The knife-footed frog is found from the Kimberley region in Western Australia, through the Northern Territory and western Queensland to north-western New South Wales and north-eastern South Australia. It prefers clay soils and typically inhabits open grassland, sparsely wooded areas, floodplains and cleared agricultural areas. As a burrowing frog, the knife-footed frog emerges to the surface after heavy rain in large numbers to feed and breed in ponds, creeks, pools, roadside drainage ditches and temporary claypans.

== Ecology ==
=== Behaviour ===
The knife-footed frog is a predator, opportunistically consuming invertebrates. It has been known to consume the larvae of Heliothis moths, a cotton plant pest, as well as mites. The knife-footed frog is adapted to living in environments where water availability is seasonal. To prevent desiccation, it burrows underground and forms a cocoon while undergoing aestivation, a period of dormancy.

When threatened, the knife-footed frog utilises defence mechanisms to avoid harm. These consist of inflating the body then raising its rear slightly. If the threat continues, it elevates its entire body on all fours before rocking back and forth towards the source of the threat. The knife-footed frog emits a defensive call that is higher in pitch that of larger hylid species such as Cyclorana australis and Cyclorana novaehollandiae.

=== Reproduction ===
Breeding takes place opportunistically after heavy rains usually from September to April. After this heavy rain, males take up position on the edges of semi-permanent waterbodies and emit a call that is a high-pitched stead moan which ends in an upward inflection. The call lasts around 1 second and is repeated, with males answering each other in chorus. Calls from males occur one after the other, with a slight difference in pitch. Breeding events usually only last for one to two days.

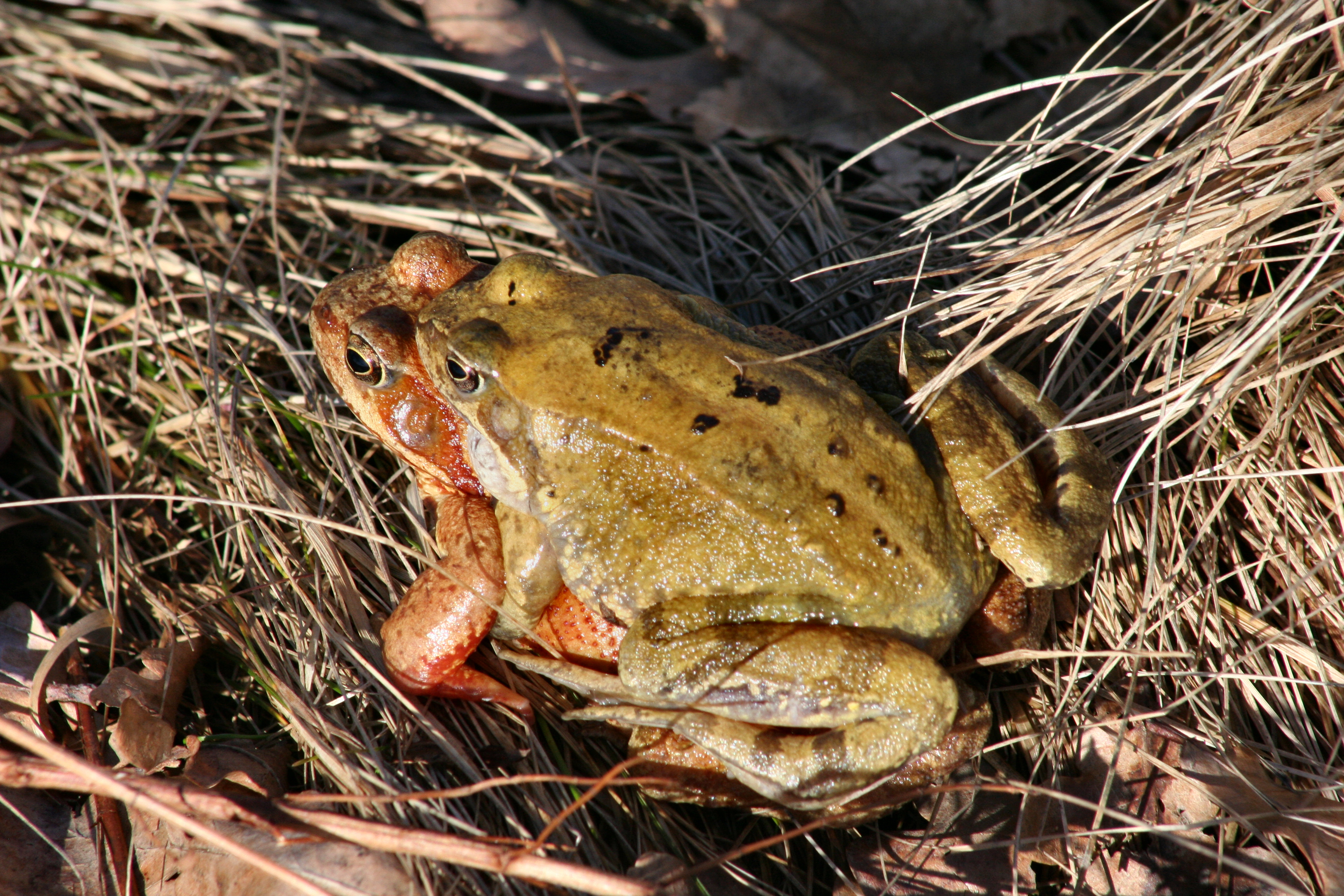
Pectoral amplexus where the male grasps the female under the armpits from behind during mating.

Like other species within the Hylidae family, the knife-footed frog breeds in pectoral amplexus, where the male grasps the female by the armpits from behind in order to fertilise her eggs. The spawn of the knife-footed frog has not been described but they are likely to be similar to other Cyclorana species with eggs being laid in large clumps floating or submerged in open water of creeks, ponds, drainage ditches and clay pans.

The tadpoles of the knife-footed frog grow up to 65 mm in length. Eyes have golden irises and are situated at the sides of the head. Body colour is dull grey to light sandy gold to silver white with darker colour underneath the abdomen in clear or tannin-coloured waters. The entire body colour is pale gold or silver in muddy or opaque waters. Dorsal and ventral fins begin about a third of the way down the body and are mostly clear or milky in opacity.

Tadpoles feed throughout the water column, voraciously consuming dead insects and other tadpoles. Where oxygen levels are low, knife-footed frog tadpoles can be seen taking air from the surface frequently and congregating in groups. Growth is rapid, like other Cyclorana species, with metamorphosis occurring after 28 days but closer to 21 days in warmer areas. Recently metamorphosed knife-footed frogs are observed usually from January to March.

== Conservation ==
The knife-footed frog was last assessed by the IUCN in 2004 and was assessed as Least Concern. The reasons given for this assessment were that the species had a widespread distribution, and the population was presumed large with no evidence of rapid decline.

In South Australia, the knife-footed frog is listed as Rare under the National Parks and Wildlife Act 1972. Species are listed in this category if they have small populations (<3000 individuals) and restricted or fragmented ranges.
