= Burrowing frog =

Burrowing frog may refer to several fossorial frog species:

- Giant burrowing frog (Heleioporus australiacus), a frog in the family Myobatrachidae found in coastal south east New South Wales and Victoria, Australia
- Indian burrowing frog (Sphaerotheca breviceps), a frog in the family Dicroglossidae found in South Asia
- Ornate burrowing frog (Opisthodon ornatus), a frog in the family Myobatrachidae native to Australia
- Northern burrowing frog (Neobatrachus aquilonius), a frog in the family Myobatrachidae endemic to Australia
- Spencer's burrowing frog (Opisthodon spenceri), a frog in the family Myobatrachidae native to western and central Australia
- Striped burrowing frog (Cyclorana alboguttata), a frog in the family Hylidae found throughout much of Australia
- Painted burrowing frog (Neobatrachus pictus), also called Sudell's frog, a frog in the family Myobatrachidae native to western Victoria, eastern South Australia including Kangaroo Island, and southern New South Wales
- Mexican burrowing toad (Rhinophrynus dorsalis), a frog in the family Rhinophrynidae found in southern Texas through Mexico, Guatemala, Honduras, and El Salvador to Nicaragua and Costa Rica
- Moquard's burrowing frog (Scaphiophryne calcarata), a frog in the family Microhylidae endemic to Madagascar
- Shovelnose frogs (Hemisus), the only genus in the family Hemisotidae, found in tropical and subtropical sub-Saharan Africa
- Rainbow burrowing frog (Scaphiophryne gottlebei), a frog in the family Microhylidae found in Madagascar
- Short-footed frog (Cyclorana brevipes), a frog in the family Hylidae native to eastern Queensland, Australia
