= Giant frog =

Giant frog may refer to:

- Blyth's river frog (Limnonectes blythii), a frog in the family Dicroglossidae found from Myanmar through western Thailand and the Malay Peninsula (Malaysia, Singapore) to Sumatra and Borneo (Indonesia)
- Cyclorana australis, also known as the northern snapping frog, a burrowing frog in the family Hylidae native to Australia
- Goliath frog (Conraua goliath), a frog in the family Conrauidae, the world's largest frog, native to Cameroon and Equatorial Guinea
