= Scaphiophryne boribory =

Conservation status
- Vulnerable (IUCN 3.1)
- CITES Appendix II

Scientific classification
- Kingdom: Animalia
- Phylum: Chordata
- Class: Amphibia
- Order: Anura
- Family: Microhylidae
- Genus: Scaphiophryne
- Species: S. boribory

Binomial name
- Scaphiophryne boribory Vences, Raxworthy, Nussbaum, and Glaw, 2003

Species of amphibian

Scaphiophryne boribory is a species of frogs in the family Microhylidae. It is endemic to eastern Madagascar and only known from the area of its type locality near Fierenana.

== Etymology ==
The specific name boribory is a Malagasy word meaning "rounded", in reference to the stout and rounded body shape of the species.

== Description ==
Adult males measure 49–60 mm (1.9–2.4 in) and females 47–59 mm (1.9–2.3 in) in snout–vent length. The body is stout. The head wider than long but less wide than the body. The tympanum is not visible and supratympanic fold is rudimentary only. The arms are moderately slender while the hind limbs are short and rather stout. The finger discs are greatly expanded while those on the toes are only slightly expanded. Skin is smooth (except on the throat) in preserved specimens. Skin appears "oversized", with loose and baggy "fit". The dorsal colour is vivid green, with prominent brown markings with black rims. The finger and toe discs are distinctly reddish. The belly is black with white spots.

Scaphiophryne boribory is similar to Scaphiophryne marmorata and Scaphiophryne spinosa but is larger, lacks tubercles in preserved specimens, and has reddish discs on fingers and toes.

== Habitat and conservation ==
Its natural habitats are flooded forest areas on sandy ground. Presumably it breeds in swamps. The altitude of its habitat has variously been given as about 950 m (3,120 ft) or 1,000–1,200 m (3,300–3,900 ft) above sea level. It is threatened by loss of its forest habitat caused by subsistence agriculture livestock grazing, timber extraction and charcoaling, spread of invasive eucalyptus, and expanding human settlements. Also over-collecting for the international pet trade might affect it. It is not known from any protected areas.
