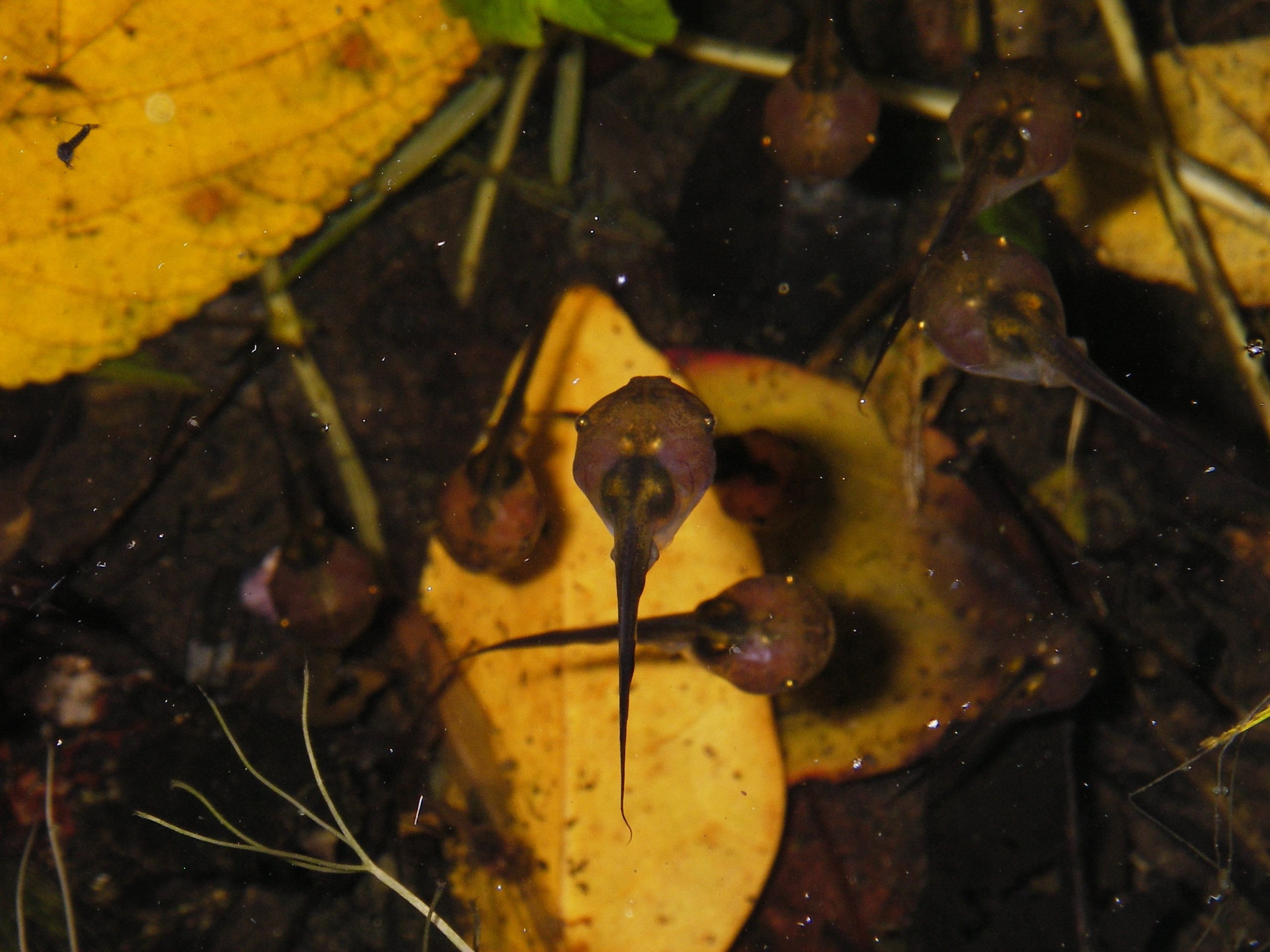
- Tadpoles of Paradoxophyla palmata

Conservation status
- Least Concern (IUCN 3.1)

Scientific classification
- Kingdom: Animalia
- Phylum: Chordata
- Class: Amphibia
- Order: Anura
- Family: Microhylidae
- Subfamily: Scaphiophryninae
- Genus: Paradoxophyla
- Species: P. palmata

Binomial name
- Paradoxophyla palmata (Guibé, 1974)

= Paradoxophyla palmata =

Species of frog

Paradoxophyla palmata is a species of frog in the family Microhylidae. It is endemic to Madagascar. Its natural habitats are subtropical or tropical moist lowland forests, intermittent freshwater marshes, and heavily degraded former forest. It is threatened by habitat loss.
