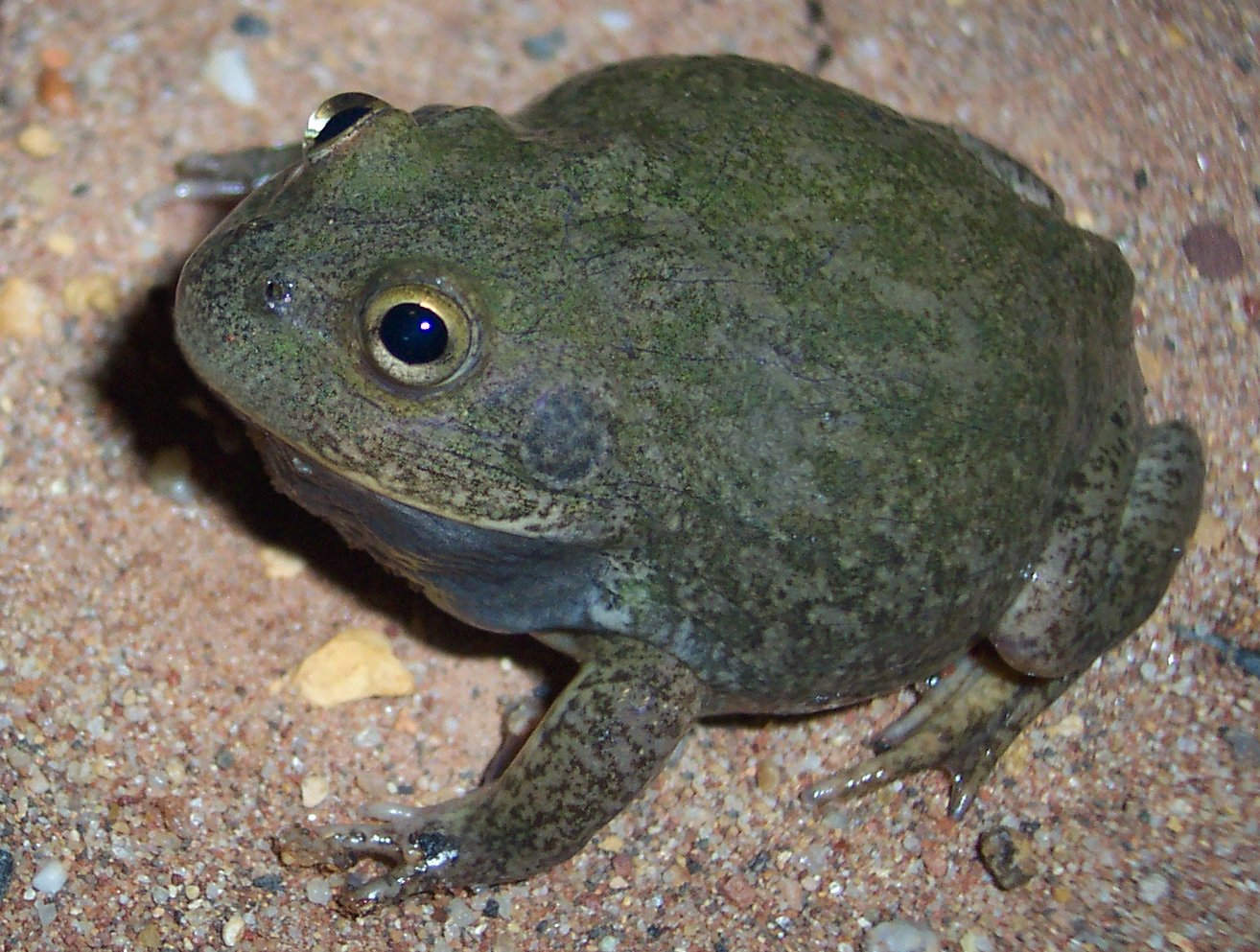
- Water-holding frog (Cyclorana platycephala)

Scientific classification
- Kingdom: Animalia
- Phylum: Chordata
- Class: Amphibia
- Order: Anura
- Family: Pelodryadidae
- Genus: Cyclorana; Steindachner, 1867

Species
- 13 species; see table
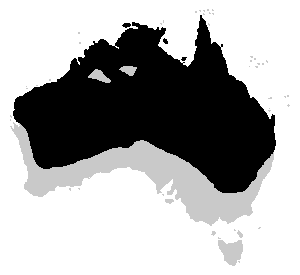
- The range of Cyclorana (in black)

= Cyclorana =

Genus of frogs

Cyclorana is a genus of frogs in the family Pelodryadidae, whose members are found in most of Australia. It was formerly considered a separate genus, but reclassified following a major revision by Frost et al. in 2006, before being reclassified as a separate genus again in 2025. Although classified as Australo-Papuan tree frogs, Cyclorana is entirely terrestrial and lacks toe pads, which their arboreal relatives use for climbing.

Cyclorana inhabits some of the most arid zones of Australia. Some species burrow underground and remain dormant for more than 5 years to survive drought conditions. They can store large amounts of water in their bladders, and form a "cocoon" around themselves to reduce loss of water, so are often called "water-holding frogs". They only return to the surface to breed and eat, and normally only after heavy summer rains. Eggs are normally laid in temporary water, and tadpoles develop quickly to metamorphose before the water completely evaporates.

== Species ==
Binomial name and author	Common name
Cyclorana alboguttata (Günther, 1867)	Striped burrowing frog
Cyclorana australis (Gray, 1842)	Giant frog
Cyclorana brevipes (Peters, 1871)	Short-footed frog
Cyclorana cryptotis Tyler & Martin, 1977	Hidden-ear frog
Cyclorana cultripes Parker, 1940	Knife-footed frog
Cyclorana longipes Tyler & Martin, 1977	Long-footed frog
Cyclorana maculosa Tyler & Martin, 1977	Daly Waters frog
Cyclorana maini Tyler & Martin, 1977	Main's frog
Cyclorana manya Van Beurden & McDonald, 1980	Small frog
Cyclorana novaehollandiae Steindachner, 1867	New Holland frog
Cyclorana occidentalis Anstis, Price, Roberts, Catalano, Hines, Doughty, and Donnellan, 2016	Water-holding frog
Cyclorana platycephala (Günther, 1873)	Water-holding frog
Cyclorana vagitus Tyler, Davies & Martin, 1981	Wailing frog
Cyclorana verrucosa Tyler & Martin, 1977	Rough frog
