= Small frog =

Conservation status
- Least Concern (IUCN 3.1)

Scientific classification
- Kingdom: Animalia
- Phylum: Chordata
- Class: Amphibia
- Order: Anura
- Family: Pelodryadidae
- Genus: Cyclorana
- Species: C. manya

Binomial name
- Cyclorana manya (van Beurden & McDonald, 1980)

Synonyms
- Ranoidea manya van Beurden & McDonald, 1980; Litoria manya

Species of amphibian

The small frog (Cyclorana manya) is a species of frog in the subfamily Pelodryadinae. It is endemic to Australia, where its natural habitats are subtropical or tropical dry lowland grassland and intermittent freshwater marshes.
