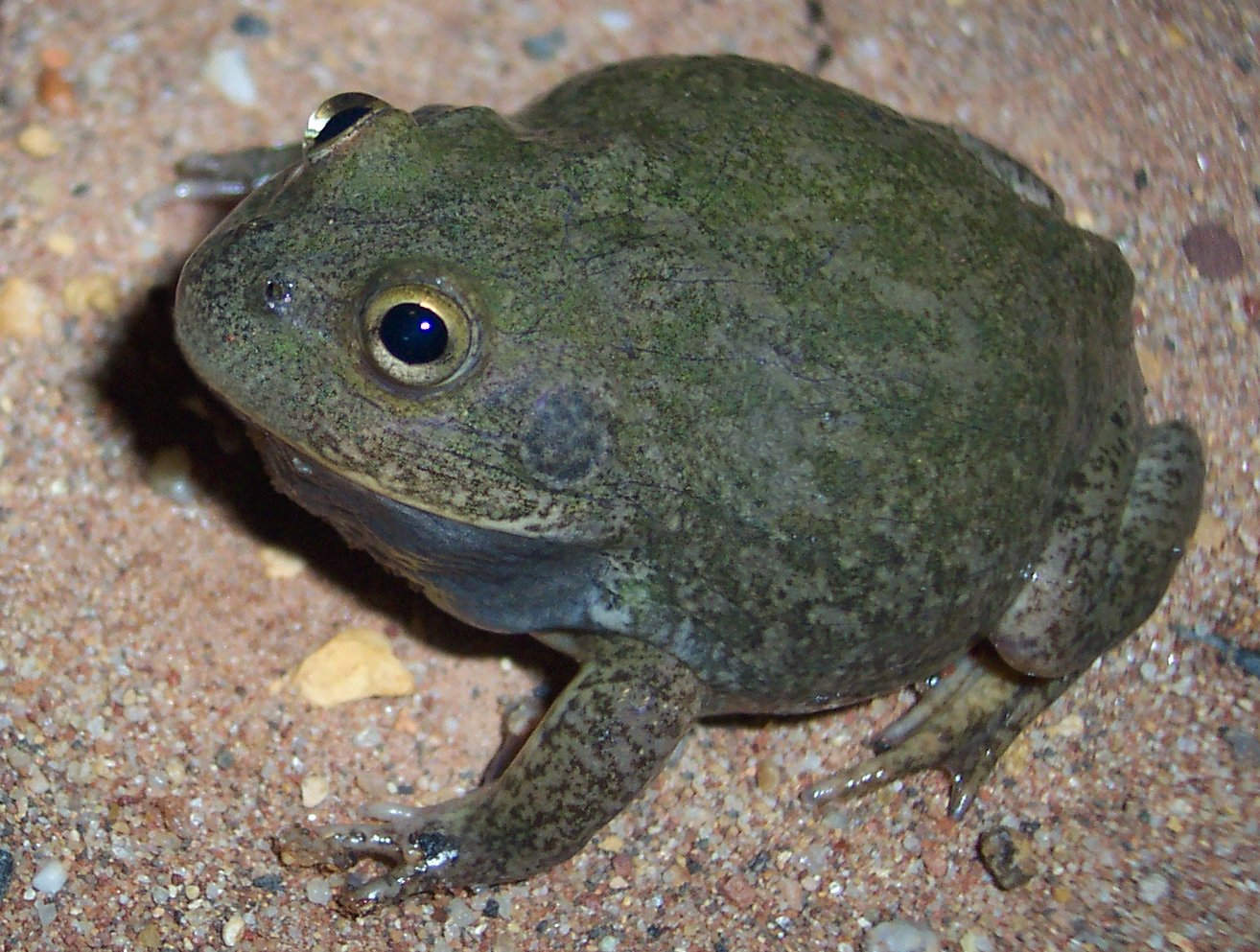

Conservation status
- Least Concern (IUCN 3.1)

Scientific classification
- Kingdom: Animalia
- Phylum: Chordata
- Class: Amphibia
- Order: Anura
- Family: Pelodryadidae
- Genus: Cyclorana
- Species: C. platycephala

Binomial name
- Cyclorana platycephala (Günther, 1873)

Synonyms
- Litoria platycephala; Ranoidea platycephala; Cyclorana slevini

= Water-holding frog =

Species of amphibian

The water-holding frog (Cyclorana platycephala), is a species of frog that is common in most Australian states and territories. It is also commonly referred to as the eastern water-holding frog and the common water holding frog. This species belongs to the Pelodryadidae family but differs from most other members as it is terrestrial and fossorial and undertakes aestivation.

== Description ==
The water-holding frog is characterised as having a broad and slightly flattened head that is greater in width than length. They have dorsally tilted eyes that are more prominent to the top of their heads, which makes them distinguishable from other similar species and enhances their downward vision and binocular perspective. Their arms and hindlimbs are short and they have extensively webbed toes that increase the surface area of their feet enabling them to swim quickly underwater to hunt for prey and escape predators. The undersides of both back feet have a metatarsal tubercle, which is a small ridge that functions like a shovel and is used to dig. Their bodies are thick and range in colour from olive and dull yellow and grey to dark brown with white underbellies. Colouration varies across population distributions and habitat types, and some may have smooth skin, whereas others may be more granular and finely speckled. The varied colouration acts as effective camouflage from predators. Adult water holding frogs can reach up to 75mm in length.

The tadpoles of this species are initially a translucent gold colour, with alternating gold and black patches along their tail muscle. As they grow the gold pigment increases over the dorsum and fades into an opaque silver towards the sides and underneath of the body. Water holding frog tadpoles can reach a maximum length of 60-70mm.

== Distribution and habitat ==
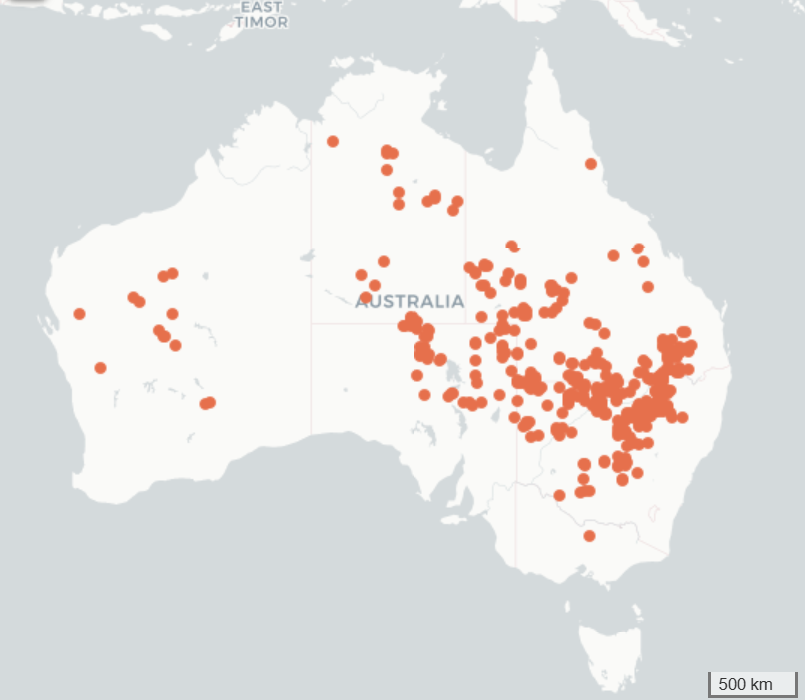
Recorded sightings of Cyclorana platycephalas across Australia since 1788.

The water-holding frog is endemic to Australia and has populations present in all Australian states and territories excluding Victoria and Tasmania. Individuals of this species are noted to be distributed across dry inland regions in two allopatric populations, the first being in the Barkly Tablelands of the Northern Territory, and the second occurring across north-eastern South Australia, southern Queensland and northern New South Wales. They populate arid and semi-arid regions and are the most widely distributed species of frog within these habitat zones. They occur in numerous habitats which are assumed to be of low elevation and prone to flooding. The range of habitats include ephemeral wetlands, scrublands, forests, grasslands, claypans, temporary swamps, intermittent pools, and rivers.

The populations are assumed to be large from frequent reports and broadly ranged. This range does overlap with national parks, but only limited research has been undertaken into the ecology and biology of the species.

== Behaviour and adaptations ==
Water-holding frogs are ectothermic, meaning they depend on external sources of body heat.

Aestivation is behaviour characteristic of water holding frogs. It is similar to how other animals hibernate, except it takes place during summer as opposed to winter when weather conditions are hot and dry. This behaviour is a response to high temperatures and climate extremes of drought. By burrowing, the stresses of temperature and water loss on the frogs are minimised. Their burrows are usually in clay soils near roots of vegetationand can be up to 1 metre deep. During aestivation water holding frogs shed several layers of their skin and secrete a water-tight mucus cocoon that is used to line their burrow in order to retain and maintain water more effectively. They also tend to ingest this lining for additional nutrition when required. Due to aestivation leading to extended periods of time away from usual food sources, they become dependent on stored energy reserves.

The common name of water-holding frog was given to this species due to its ability to store large amounts of water in its bladder. They are able to absorb up to half their body weight in water and store it in pockets in their skin as well as their bladder. Their ability to store water is what allows them to aestivate and survive underground for up to five years without drinking new water. During aestivation their metabolic rate slows and their oxygen consumption has been found to reduce by 70% compared to when they are above ground.

Water-holding frogs are later awakened from aestivation when periods of rainfall occur, and they emerge to the surface to breed. Once they surface, they also swim in ponds to feed, using their hands to catch prey and stuff them into their mouths. They are active above ground during the night, and spend the day hidden beneath rocks and vegetation. They need to feed whilst they are above ground as they need to create fat reserves great enough to sustain them throughout the next aestivation period. After feeding and breeding, they then bloat themselves with water and bury themselves in burrows once again.

== Reproduction ==
Sexual maturity is reached by females when they grow to a length of 48-50mm, whereas males reach sexual maturity and have mature sperm at a smaller length of 34mm.

The breeding process of water-holding frogs commences after spring and summer rainfall when they emerge from their burrows. Males begin to call for mates whilst either submerged or afloat in water on the same evening they come out of their burrows. Their mating call has been noted to sound like a motor bike starting with a long drawn out "mawww" noise. Breeding usually occurs in warmer months in ephemeral wetlands after rain. After mating, females release up to 500 eggs during spawning in still waters. The water holding frog's eggs are not held together by a frothy mass so they may attach in clumps to surrounding vegetation or spread in a thin film on the surface, thus ensuring adequate oxygen in warm waters suffering from oxygen depletion. The metamorphosis of their tadpoles commonly takes around 40 days but can take as little as 14 days. Once they reach their maximum length, they begin to form abdominal body fats.

A study of gametogenesis in water-holding frogs has indicated that not all eggs of females are released at once and can be stored over winter. It also proved that males have mature sperm all year round and production is continuous but slower in winter. The ability to store and continuously produce gametes is beneficial as the onset and duration of rainfall is unpredictable. It is not common for breeding to occur in winter but may if conditions are suitable.

== Diet ==
The diet of water-holding frogs is broad and ranges from worms and insects to tadpoles and other small frogs. Frogs may eat their own tadpoles but only when food availability is scarce. On dry land they will also feed on ants and termites.

== Predation and threats ==
Predators of the water-holding frog includes snakes, birds and monitor lizards. Other threats to this species include climate change and habitat loss through land clearing and the associated salinity, but the extent of which is yet to be determined.

The species was assessed in 2020 for the IUCN Red List of Threatened Species and has been listed as least concern as they have stable and widespread populations.

== Human interaction ==
Indigenous Australians would use the frog's ability to store water. When slightly squeezed the frog releases its stored water from its skin pockets and bladder. This water is safe to be consumed and Indigenous Australians would dig the frogs from their burrows and then drink the fresh water they released. The frog is then released with no direct harm caused to the amphibian. However, during dry seasons, the loss of water reserves will lessen their chances of survival and they may die.

== See also ==
- Tiddalik, a myth based on the frog
