= Tiddalik =

Australian legendary creature

The tale of Tiddalik the frog is a creation story from Australian Indigenous Dreaming Stories. The legend of Tiddalik is not only an important story of the Dreamtime, but has been the subject of popular modern children's books. In some Aboriginal language groups, Tiddalik is known as "Molok".

== Narrative ==
In the creation myth, Tiddalik awoke one morning in Wollombi Valley with an insatiable thirst and started to drink until he had gulped down all the available fresh water. Creatures and plant life everywhere began to die due to lack of moisture. Other animals conspired against Tiddalik and devised a plan for him to release all of the water he had consumed. This was successfully coordinated by a wise old owl, when Nabunum the eel made Tiddalik laugh when he tied himself in comical shapes. As Tiddalik laughed, the water rushed out of him to replenish the lakes, swamps and rivers.

== Origin ==
The story has been said to describe the water-holding frog (Ranoidea platycephala) from central Australia. The frogs burrow underground during dry periods and emerge during the rain to absorb large amounts of water, breed and feed. This allows it to avoid desiccation during drought, a trait not exhibited by most frogs. They were used by Indigenous Australians during times of drought as a source of water.

This story is found in many places around Australia but is often attributed to the Gunaikurnai people of South Gippsland, Victoria and has spread worldwide since first being published. Tiddalik is commemorated in a statue in Warwick, Queensland. Various versions of the story were recorded by amateur ethnographers in the late nineteenth century, originating with the Gunaikurnai people near Port Albert, approximately 225 kilometres (140 mi) south-east of Melbourne. In the original story, Tiddalik formed the area's bays, estuaries, inlets and islands. The substance of the story has changed over time, with different animals being able to make Tiddalik laugh, and many of the modern versions being dissimilar to those of the nineteenth century.

The water-holding frog ascribed in modern times to Tiddalik is not found in the area of the legend's origin. It is likely that Tiddalik either refers to a different frog or is a memory of a time, 10,000 to 12,000 years ago, when the landscape was sufficiently different for the frog's range to extend to the South Gippsland. While the modern story has a happy ending, with water returned for all to use, the original ends in environmental disaster. The flood caused many to drown and others to be stranded on islands. Those stranded were rescued by Borun the pelican, with the end of the tale explaining how the pelican's feathers subsequently changed from all-black to a mixture of black and white.

== In popular culture ==
In the 19th world book for Rifts about Australia published in 1999, author Ben Cassin Lucas invented "Tikilik" based on Tiddalik. Lucas designated it as one of the "Gods of the Dreamtime". Tikilik was considered too powerful to assign statistics to, only its children were statted.
