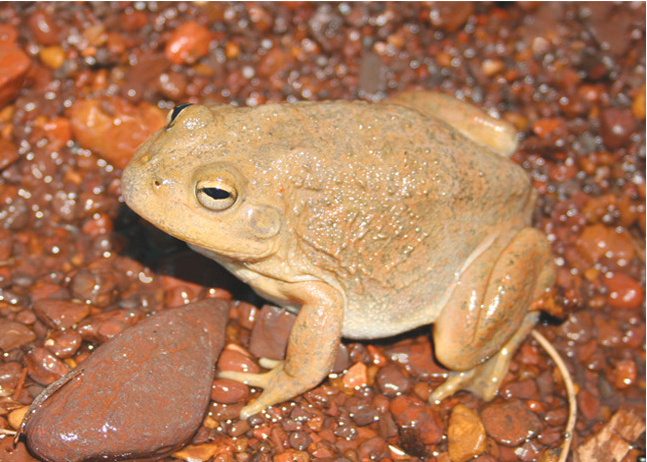
- Female

Scientific classification
- Kingdom: Animalia
- Phylum: Chordata
- Class: Amphibia
- Order: Anura
- Family: Pelodryadidae
- Genus: Cyclorana
- Species: C. occidentalis

Binomial name
- Cyclorana occidentalis Anstis et al, 2016

Synonyms
- Cyclorana occidentalis Anstis, Price, Roberts, Catalano, Hines, Doughty & Donnellan, 2016; Ranoidea occidentalis

= Western water-holding frog =

Species of Australian frog

The western water-holding frog (Cyclorana occidentalis) is a species of frog that is endemic to Australia. The specific epithet occidentalis refers to its distribution in the western part of the continent.

== Description ==
The species is large and robust. Males grow to about 60 mm (2.4 inches) in length (SVL) and females to 70 mm (2.8 inches). Colouration varies from grey to dark brown. The eyes are perched on top of the flat head, which has a large mouth. The limbs are short, with webbed toes. The mating call is a low waah waah waah..., uttered 80 times a minute.

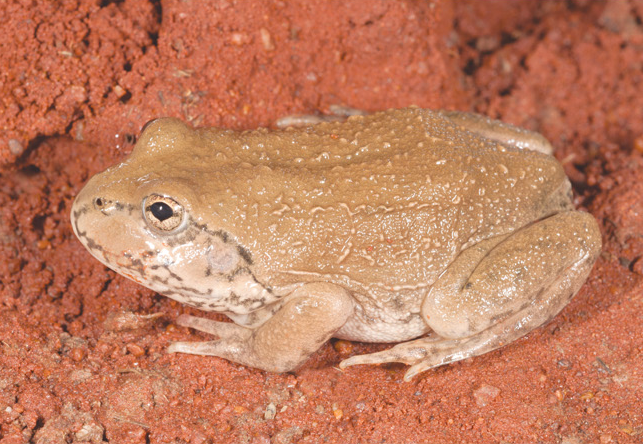
Male

== Behaviour ==
The species breeds in temporary water bodies, mainly in the arid zone. The frog can aestivate for months in a burrow while conditions are dry, shedding its skin to form a cocoon, until cyclonic rains fill depressions in the landscape and trigger breeding activity. The females lay large masses of up to 500 eggs.

== Distribution and habitat ==
The species has a wide distribution in arid and semi-arid parts of central Western Australia, southwards from Karratha to Kalgoorlie and eastwards from the west coast to the Canning Stock Route and Mavis Rock.

== Photos ==
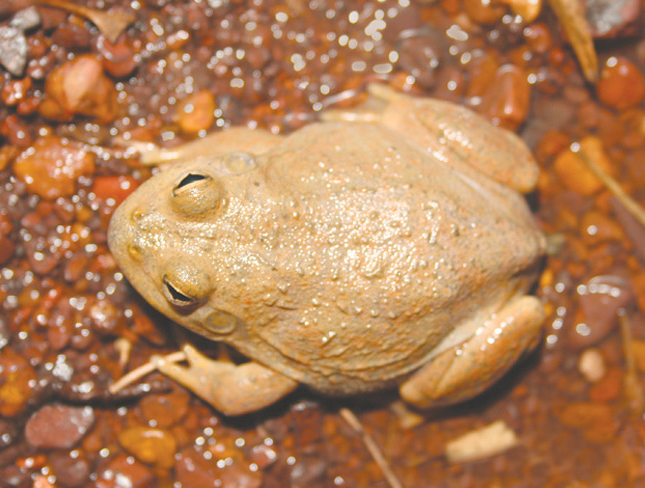

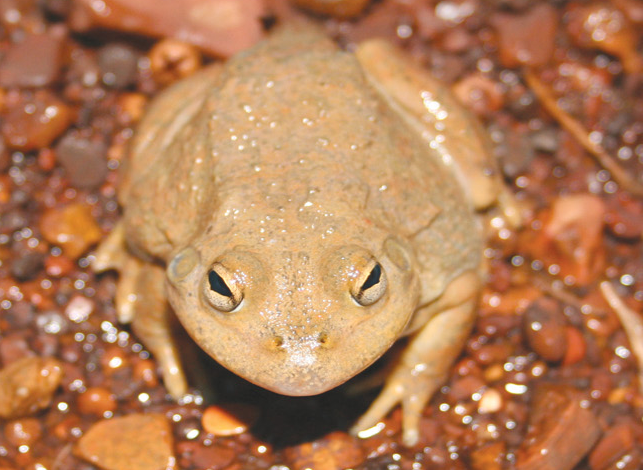

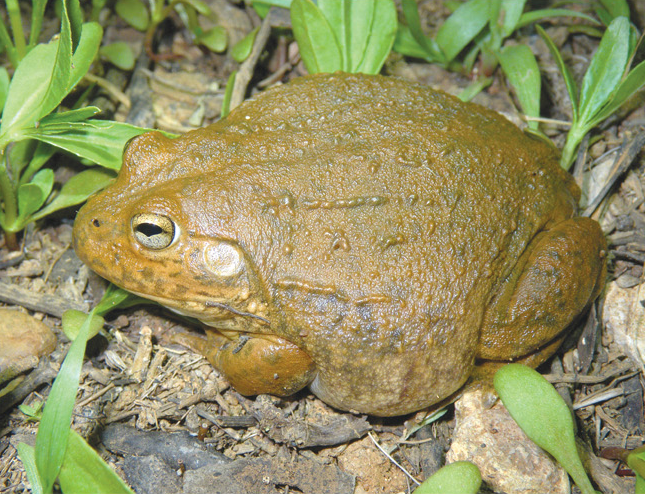
