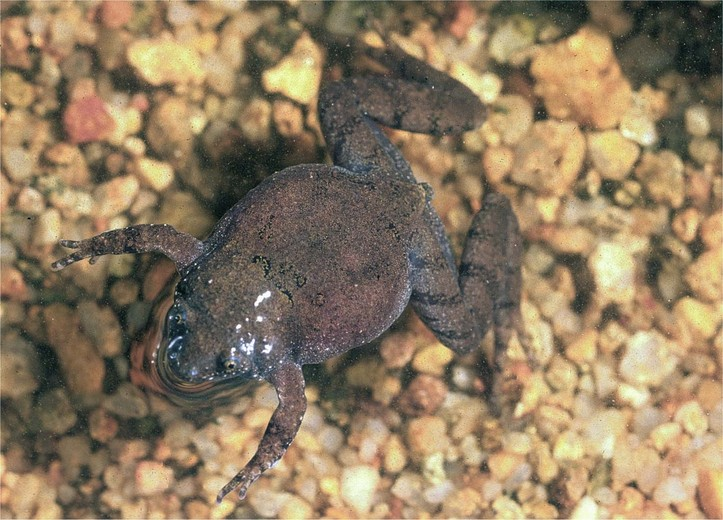
- Paradoxophyla tiarano

Scientific classification
- Kingdom: Animalia
- Phylum: Chordata
- Class: Amphibia
- Order: Anura
- Family: Microhylidae
- Subfamily: Scaphiophryninae
- Genus: Paradoxophyla; Blommers-Schlösser & Blanc, 1991

Type species
- Microhyla palmata Guibé, 1974

Diversity
- 2 species

= Paradoxophyla =

Genus of amphibians

Paradoxophyla is a small genus of microhylid frogs endemic to Madagascar.

== Species ==
- Paradoxophyla palmata (Guibé, 1974) – web-foot frog
- Paradoxophyla tiarano Andreone, Aprea, Odierna, & Vences, 2006
