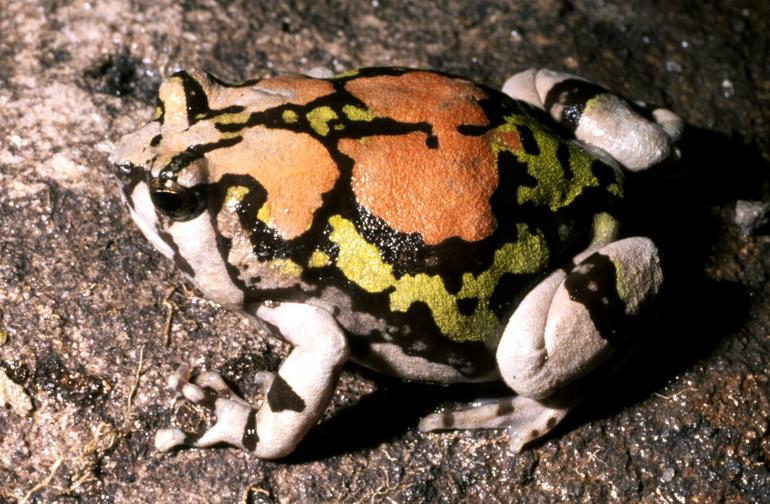
- Scaphiophryne gottlebei

Scientific classification
- Kingdom: Animalia
- Phylum: Chordata
- Class: Amphibia
- Order: Anura
- Family: Microhylidae
- Subfamily: Scaphiophryninae
- Genus: Scaphiophryne; Boulenger, 1882

Type species
- Scaphiophryne marmorata Boulenger, 1882

Diversity
- 9 species

Synonyms
- Pseudohemisus Mocquard, 1895

= Scaphiophryne =

Genus of frogs from Madagascar

Scaphiophryne is a genus of microhylid frogs endemic to Madagascar. Some of the species are strikingly marked, while others are highly cryptic. They are rather plump and generally found on the ground. Several species in the genus are threatened because of habitat loss and overcollection for the international pet trade.

== Behavior ==
Species within the genus are robust burrowing frogs, and they have an explosive breeding behavior. This type of behavior is typically seen for species living within temporary and seasonal habitats, which is the case in Madagascar.

== Tadpoles ==
Tadpoles are intermediate in morphology between those of ranids and microhylids. They have rows of oral papillae, but not keratinized teeth or horny beaks.

The unique Scaphiophryne larval morphology allows for filter-feeding and the ability to use the papillae to wipe particles from substrate and churn particles from the bottom of the water source of residence.

The tadpole morphology allows for distinguishing from the Pseudohemisus subgenus.

== Phylogeny details ==
The two subgenera, Scaphiophryne and Pseudohemisus, are monophyletic based on molecular analysis. The species within the Scaphiophryne subgenera are lineages that have been confirmed to be evolutionarily independent. This is based on analysis of mitochondrial and nuclear genes, where mitochondrial divergence was low, nuclear divergence was distinct, and nuclear heterozygosity was found to be high. Hybridization between species was not found, which has been previously hypothesized to happen.

== Species ==
Binomial name and author	Common name
Scaphiophryne boribory Vences, Raxworthy, Nussbaum & Glaw, 2003
Scaphiophryne brevis (Grandidier, 1872)	Brown rain frog
Scaphiophryne calcarata Mocquard, 1895	Mocquard's rain frog
Scaphiophryne gottlebei Busse & Böhme, 1992	Red rain frog
Scaphiophryne madagascariensis Boulenger, 1882	Madagascar rain frog, green rain frog
Scaphiophryne marmorata (Boulenger, 1882)	Marbled rain frog
Scaphiophryne matsoko Raselimanana, Raxworthy, Andreone, Glaw & Vences, 2014
Scaphiophryne menabensis Glos, Glaw, and Vences, 2005
Scaphiophryne spinosa Steindachner, 1882
