= Scaphiophryne madagascariensis =

Conservation status
- Near Threatened (IUCN 3.1)

Scientific classification
- Kingdom: Animalia
- Phylum: Chordata
- Class: Amphibia
- Order: Anura
- Family: Microhylidae
- Genus: Scaphiophryne
- Species: S. madagascariensis

Binomial name
- Scaphiophryne madagascariensis (Boulenger, 1882)

Synonyms
- Scaphiophryne pustulosa Angel & Guibé, 1945

Species of frog

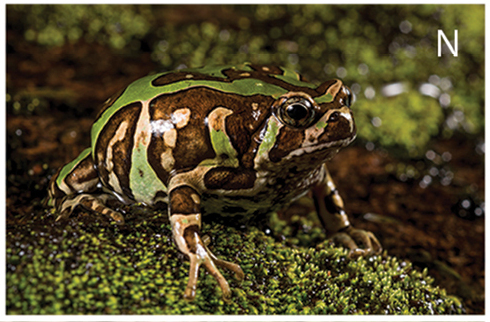
Figure 2; Hyperoliid, microhylid, ptychadenid and mantellid (subfamilies Boophinae and Laliostominae) species identified in this study. Sampling localities for each photographed individual are provided. ANP ES – Andringitra National Park Eastern Slopes; ANP WS – Andringitra National Park Western Slopes (Fig. 1; Suppl. material 1: Table S1). N. Scaphiophryne (Scaphiophryne) madagascariensis from Andramena (ANP WS). Photographs by Javier Lobón-Rovira (A–J, L–R) and Francesco Belluardo (K).

Scaphiophryne madagascariensis is a species of frog in the family Microhylidae. It is endemic to Madagascar. Its natural habitats are subtropical or tropical moist montane forests, moist savanna, subtropical or tropical high-altitude grassland, freshwater marshes, intermittent freshwater marshes, arable land, and rural gardens. It is threatened by habitat loss.
