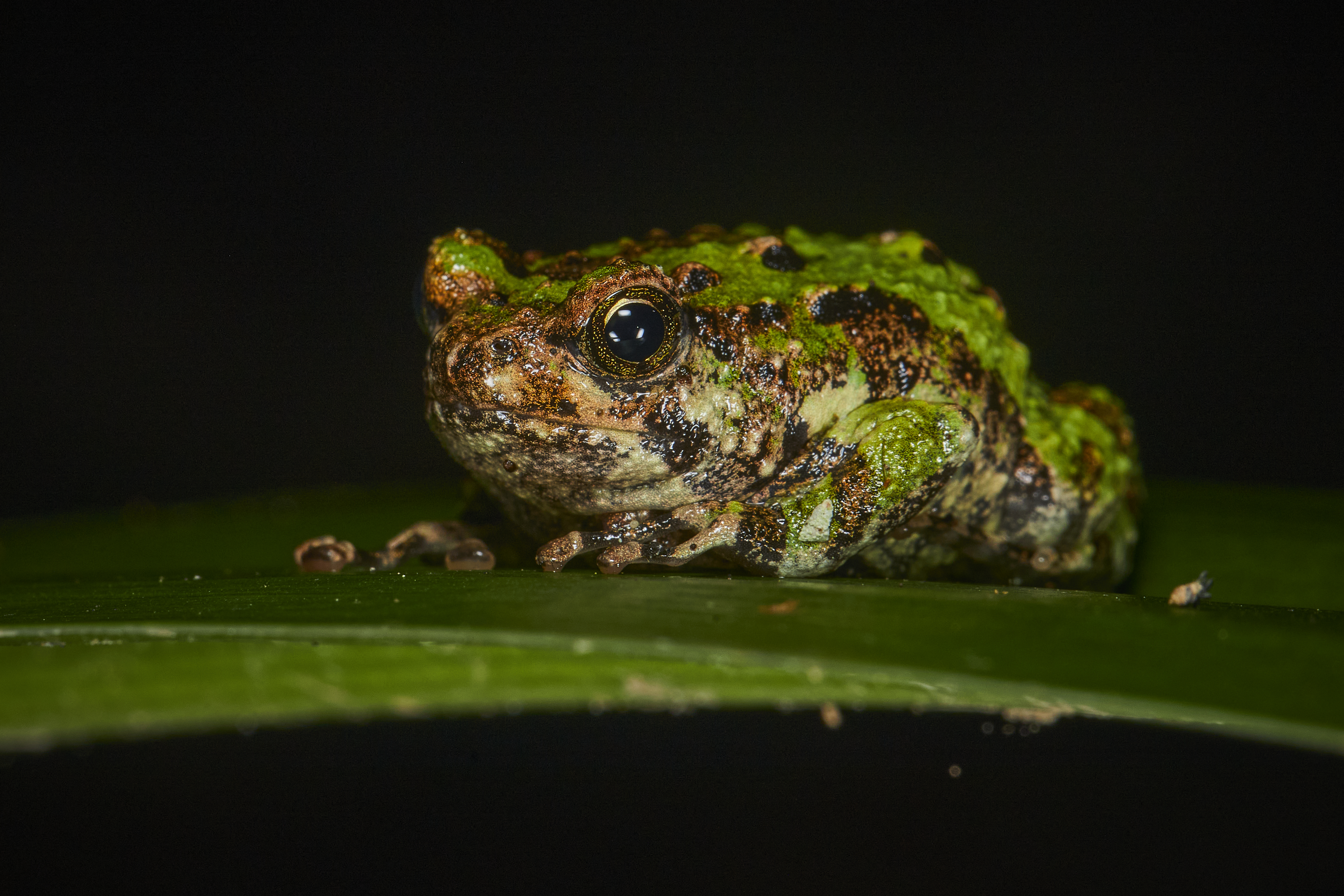

Conservation status
- Vulnerable (IUCN 3.1)
- CITES Appendix II

Scientific classification
- Kingdom: Animalia
- Phylum: Chordata
- Class: Amphibia
- Order: Anura
- Family: Microhylidae
- Genus: Scaphiophryne
- Species: S. marmorata

Binomial name
- Scaphiophryne marmorata Boulenger, 1882

= Scaphiophryne marmorata =

Species of amphibian

Scaphiophryne marmorata is a species of frog in the family Microhylidae. It is commonly known as the green burrowing frog and the marbled rain frog. It is endemic to Madagascar. It is classified as "Vulnerable" by the IUCN as it is threatened by habitat loss.

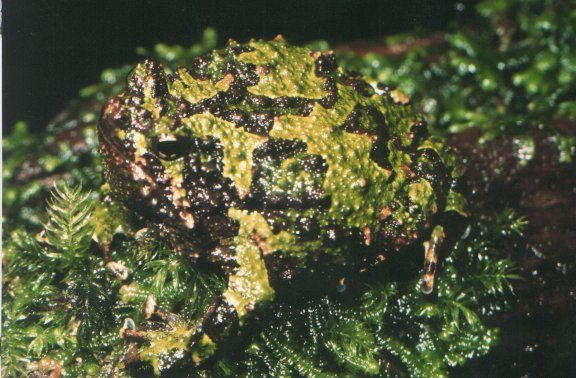
Scaphiophryne marmorata

== Taxonomy ==
A revision of the Scaphiophryne marmorata complex was undertaken in 2003 and as a result, Scaphiophryne spinosa was removed from synonymy with Scaphiophryne marmorata and a new species, Scaphiophryne boribory, was described.

== Description ==
The female green burrowing frog grows to a length of about 40 millimetres (1.6 in) but the male is smaller at 30 millimetres (1.2 in). It is nearly globular in shape with a small, flattened head, short snout, prominent eyes and well muscled limbs. The skin of the back is mostly smooth but there are two symmetrical pairs of thorny tubercles on the upper back. The digits on both fore and hind limbs are elongated which helps the frog to clamber around in trees and bushes. There are expanded discs at the end of the fingers which is a distinctive feature of this species. The hind limbs are short with bony flanges on the heels to help with digging. The colour is a bright green liberally spotted with darker green and black patches. In the western part of its range the colour is more olive. The underside is often marbled with white.

== Distribution and habitat ==
The green burrowing frog is found in the rainforests of eastern Madagascar and in the drier western half of the island. It occurs up to 1,000 metres (3,300 ft) above sea level.

== Biology ==
The green burrowing frog spends much of its time buried in dead leaves on the forest floor but when it emerges it often climbs into the branches of bushes and small trees to catch the insects on which it feeds.

Little is known of the breeding habits of this frog but it is believed to be an "explosive" breeder, with all the frogs in an area coming together at one time to mate and spawn in temporary pools at the beginning of the rainy season. The tadpoles are likely to grow quickly so as to be mature enough to live independently when the pools dry up.

== Status ==
The green burrowing frog is listed as "Vulnerable" in the IUCN Red List of Threatened Species. This is because, though it is locally abundant, its range in Madagascar is small and fragmented, it is threatened by habitat loss and populations seem to be in decline. A small number of individuals are gathered for the pet trade but the possibility of captive breeding is being investigated which would ease this pressure. This frog has a secure environment in the several national parks in which it is found.
