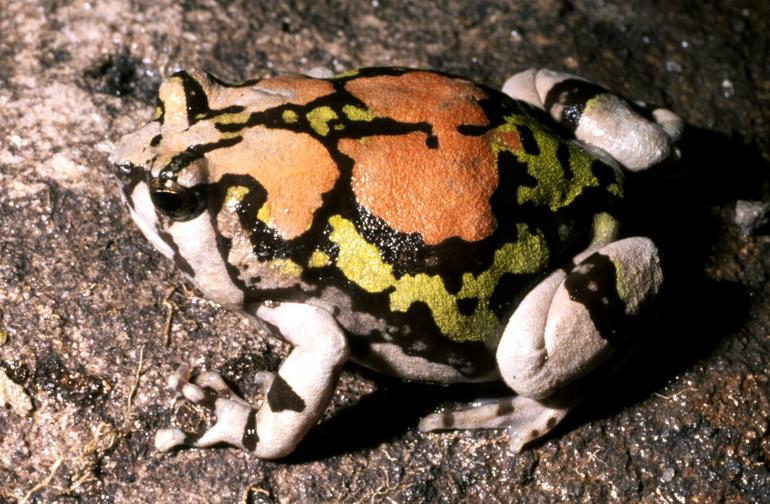
- Scaphiophryne gottlebei

Scientific classification
- Kingdom: Animalia
- Phylum: Chordata
- Class: Amphibia
- Order: Anura
- Family: Microhylidae
- Subfamily: Scaphiophryninae; Laurent, 1946

Genera
- Paradoxophyla; Scaphiophryne

= Scaphiophryninae =

Subfamily of amphibians

The Scaphiophryninae are a subfamily of microhylid frogs native to Madagascar.

== Description ==
Scaphiophryninae are small to middle-sized frogs, measuring 20–50 mm (0.79–1.97 in) in snout–vent length. They are terrestrial. Species living in drier environments are burrowers that emerge at the start of the rainy season. However, at least Scaphiophryne gottlebei is also able to climb vertical rock faces. Breeding is explosive and takes place in temporary pools. Eggs float on the surface and hatch into free-living tadpoles.

== Genera ==
Scaphiophryninae contains two genera.

- Paradoxophyla Blommers-Schlösser & Blanc, 1991 — 2 species
- Scaphiophryne Boulenger, 1882 — 9 species
