= Scaphiophryne menabensis =

Conservation status
- Least Concern (IUCN 3.1)

Scientific classification
- Kingdom: Animalia
- Phylum: Chordata
- Class: Amphibia
- Order: Anura
- Family: Microhylidae
- Genus: Scaphiophryne
- Species: S. menabensis

Binomial name
- Scaphiophryne menabensis Glos, Glaw & Vences, 2005

Species of frog

Scaphiophryne menabensis is a species of frog in the family Microhylidae. It is endemic to Madagascar. Its natural habitats are subtropical or tropical dry forests and intermittent freshwater marshes. It is threatened by habitat loss.
