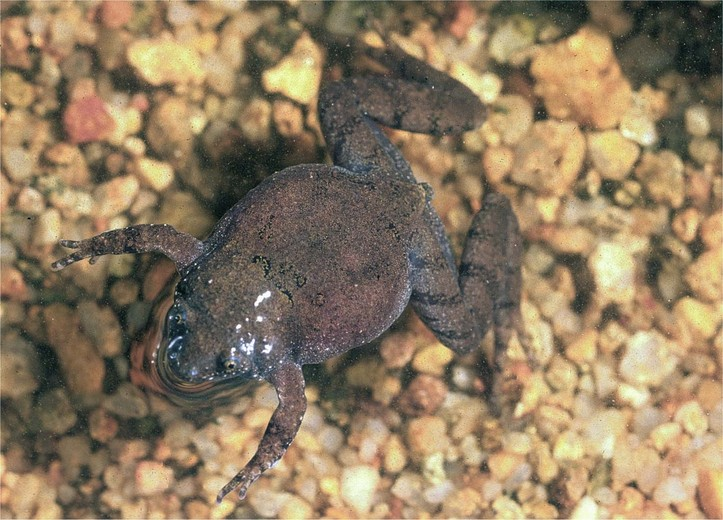

Scientific classification
- Kingdom: Animalia
- Phylum: Chordata
- Class: Amphibia
- Order: Anura
- Family: Microhylidae
- Genus: Paradoxophyla
- Species: P. tiarano

Binomial name
- Paradoxophyla tiarano Andreone, Aprea, Odierna, & Vences, 2006

= Paradoxophyla tiarano =

Species of frog

Paradoxophyla tiarano is a species of frog in the family Microhylidae endemic to Madagascar.
