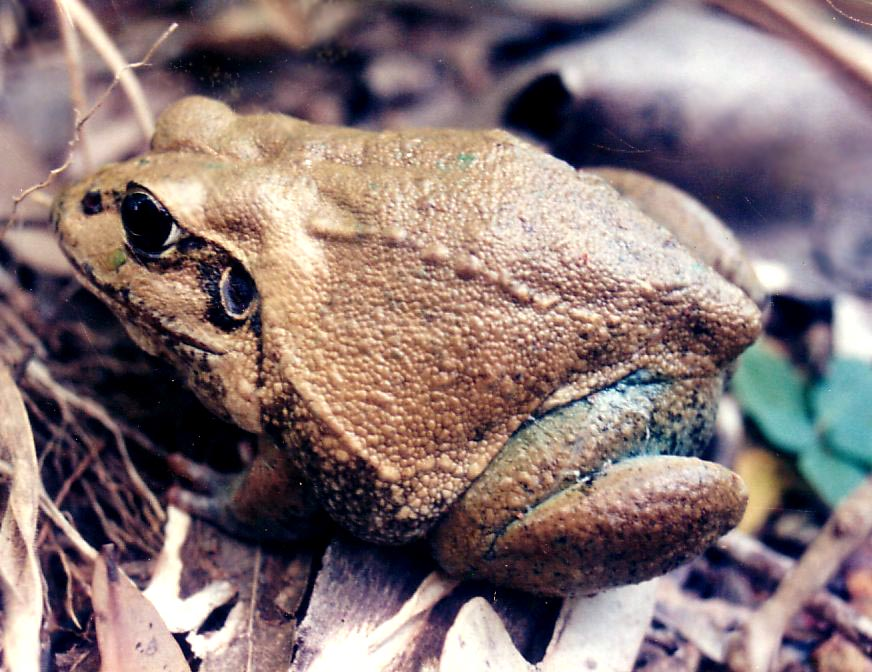

Conservation status
- Least Concern (IUCN 3.1)

Scientific classification
- Kingdom: Animalia
- Phylum: Chordata
- Class: Amphibia
- Order: Anura
- Family: Pelodryadidae
- Genus: Cyclorana
- Species: C. australis

Binomial name
- Cyclorana australis (Gray, 1842)
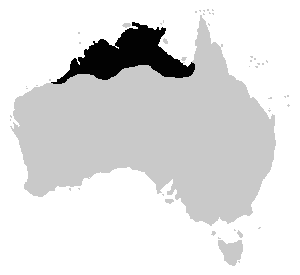

= Cyclorana australis =

Giant frog

Species of amphibian

Cyclorana australis, commonly known as the giant frog, northern snapping frog, or round frog, is a burrowing species of frog native to Australia. It occurs from western Queensland through to northern Western Australia.

== Description ==
These frogs reach up to 100 mm in length. They are variable in colour and patterning; adults range from grey to dull pink to green or more commonly brown on the dorsal surface, occasionally with darker markings. The skin on the dorsum has low warts and two longitudinal skin folds with a second pair on the flanks. The belly is white and finely granular. A dark brown streak starts from the tip of the snout and runs across the tympanum and ends over the shoulder. A similarly coloured bar runs under the eye and another runs the length of the upper jaw. The tympanum is partially covered with a skin fold and is distinct. The back of the thighs range from flesh-coloured to dark blue and the groin is a pale blue-green colour. The rear toes have a slight webbing and front toes are free from webbing.

== Ecology and behaviour ==
This species inhabits floodplains, woodlands, and grasslands. During the wet season, it is commonly found during the day basking beside breeding sites, including temporary ponds, creeks, or flooded areas. The males can be heard making a short "unk" sound from late November through to February. Eggs are laid in clumps of up to 7000, but more commonly 100 to 1000. They sink soon after being laid.

== Similar species ==
This species may be confused with the New Holland frog or the striped burrowing frog. It can be distinguished from the latter by the longitudinal skin folds and from the former by the colouration on the back of the thighs.
