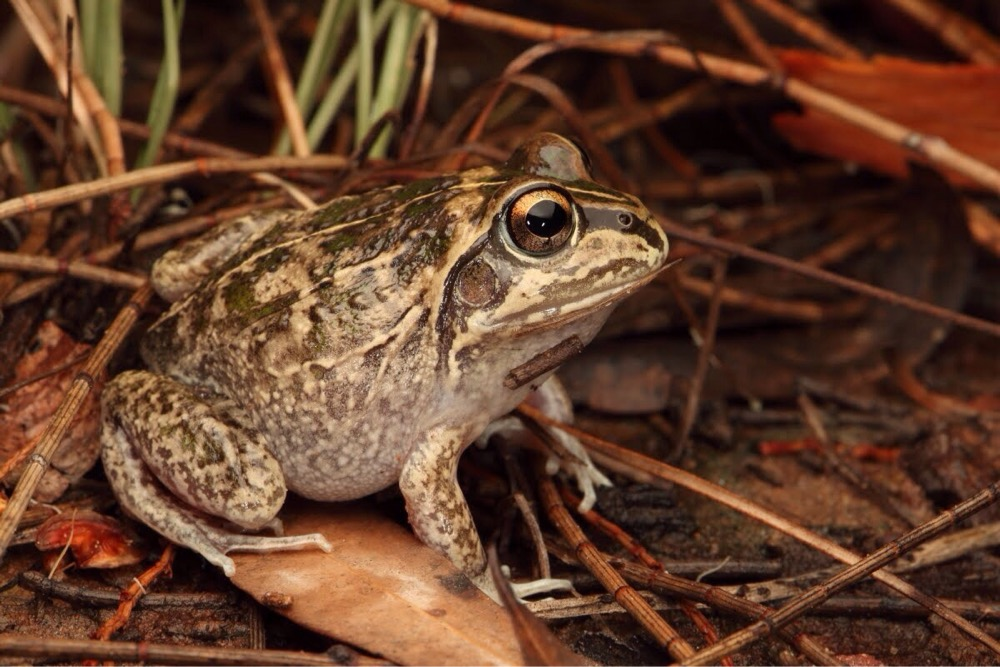

Conservation status
- Least Concern (IUCN 3.1)

Scientific classification
- Kingdom: Animalia
- Phylum: Chordata
- Class: Amphibia
- Order: Anura
- Family: Pelodryadidae
- Genus: Cyclorana
- Species: C. verrucosa

Binomial name
- Cyclorana verrucosa Tyler and Martin, 1977
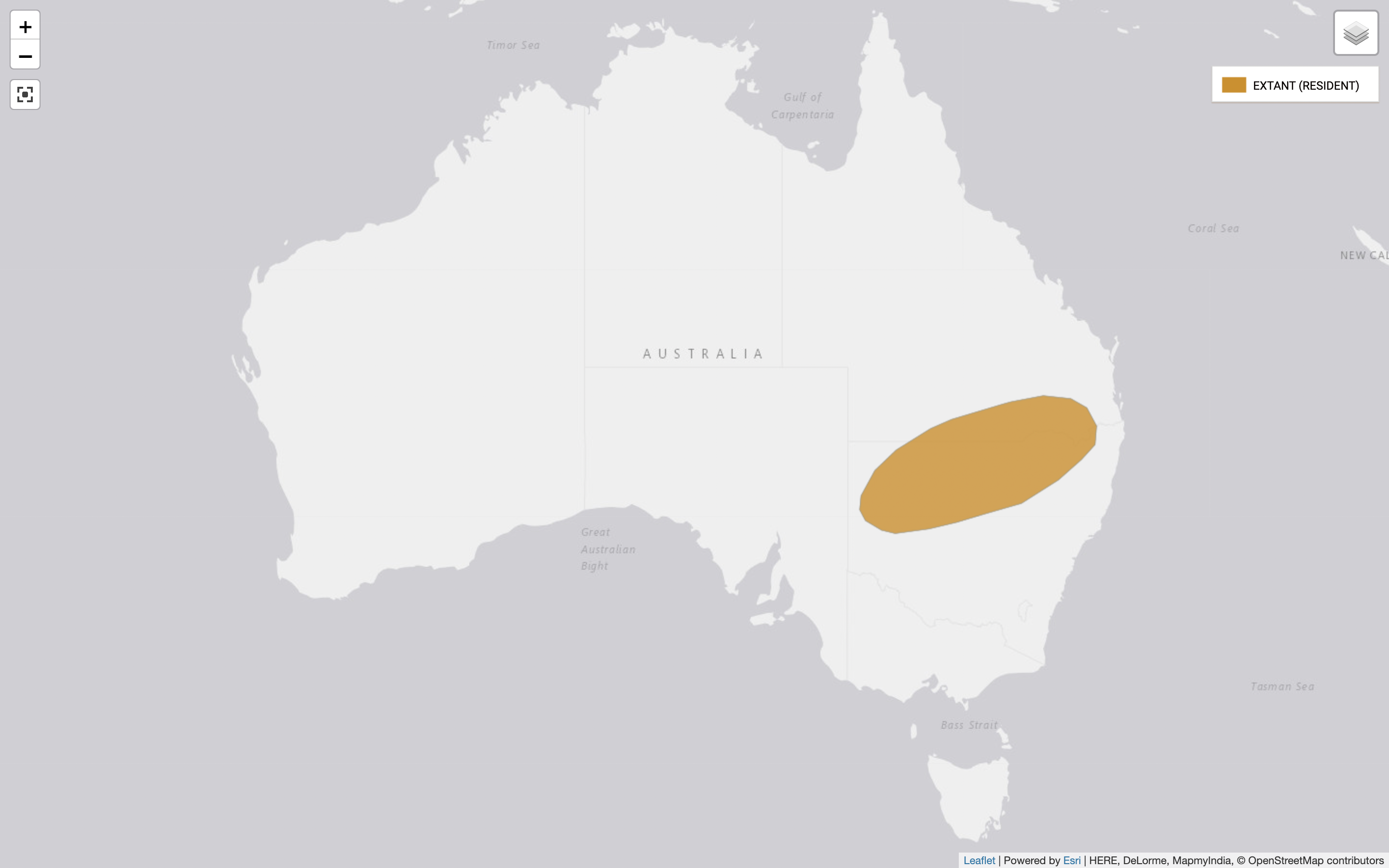
- Map of Australia showing the distribution of rough frog

Synonyms
- Cyclorana verrucosus Tyler and Martin, 1977; Ranoidea verrucosa (Tyler and Martin, 1977); Litoria (Cyclorana) verrucosa (Tyler and Martin, 1977); Dryopsophus verrucosus (Tyler and Martin, 1977)

= Rough frog =

Species of amphibian

The rough frog (Cyclorana verrucosa), also known as the woodland water-holding frog, warty water-holding frog, and red-backed Cyclorana, is a species of treefrog native to northern New South Wales and south-eastern Queensland, Australia.

== Taxonomy ==
The rough frog was originally described as Cyclorana verrucosus by Tyler and Martin in 1997, and later placed in the genus Litoria, until Cyclorana was reinstated in 2025.

== Description ==
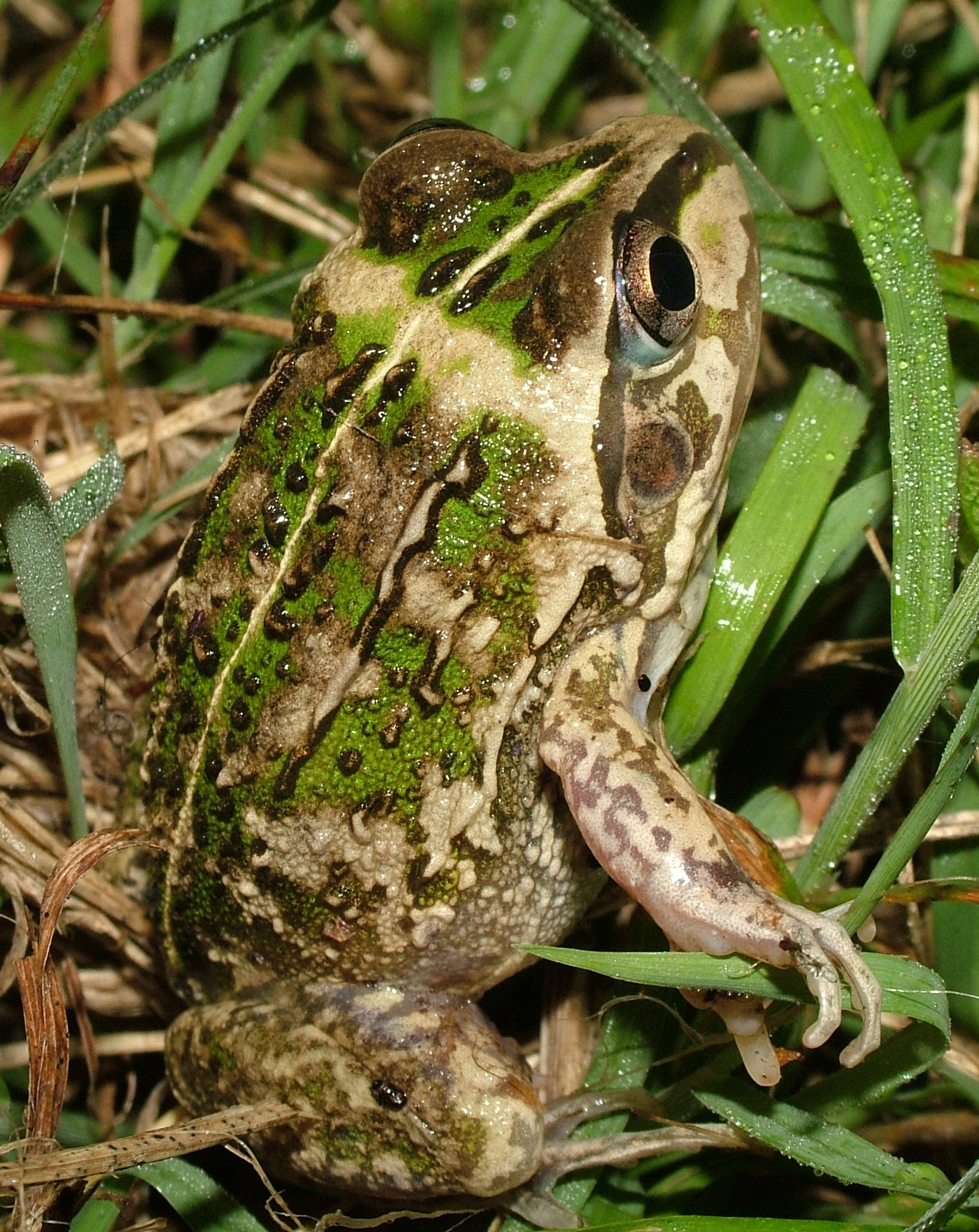
Rough frog displaying the green and brown colour variation.

The rough frog is a medium-sized burrowing frog. Male frogs reach between 35–45 mm in body length and females are slightly larger at 37–49 mm in length.

This stout frog is typically grey-brown to olive brown in colour. Its back is irregularly marked with dark green spots on a tan background, or black/dark grey on a pale brown background. Both colour variations have a thin pale cream coloured stripe that runs along the middle of the back from front to rear. The belly is pale whitish colour, and the male has a grey throat. The edge of the upper lip is brown with white flecks. A broad dark band runs either side of the nose and continues behind the eye before merging with the patterns along the side body.

As per its namesake, the rough frog's skin has a rough, warty or ridged texture. The throat of the male is finely granular, but the female's throat is smooth. The rough skin distinguishes it from all other frogs that live within its geographical area.

Toes are one-third webbed. The inner metatarsal tubercle is shovel-shaped to assist in burrowing.

== Distribution and habitat ==
The rough frog can be found near seasonal ponds, creeks and claypans in open grassland and closed or open woodland on clay soils. It is distributed across Northern NSW into south-eastern Queensland, but not along the coast or in the ranges. It spends dry periods underground in dormancy and emerges following heavy rain. Roadside reserves are considered as significant habitat areas.

== Behaviour ==
Little is known regarding the behaviour of the rough frog. It is a burrowing frog that will burrow during dry periods, and emerge to breed and feed after extended periods of rain.

== Lifespan and reproduction ==
Little is known about the rough frog's lifespan. It breeds in flooded depressions during spring to summer, and sometimes in autumn, after heavy rains. Males sound mating calls that resemble a long moaning growl. Very little data exists regarding reproduction of the Rough Frog, however it is conserved to be similar to Litoria cultripes, in which eggs are laid in large clumps under the surface of water in temporary ponds, swamps or roadside ditches. Larvae are free swimming, tadpoles can grow as long as 7.5 cm being a dull gold/white in colour. It is unknown how long they take to develop into frog, but they develop rapidly during warm months before water drys up.

== Conservation ==
The rough frog is defined as Least Concern on IUCN's Red List. The population is stable. There are conservation sites throughout the habitat range of the frog, and it currently occurs in at least one protected area. Fragmentation of population is limited, but there is a continuing decline is area and quality of habitat.

Agriculture and aquaculture including annual and perennial non-timber crops are identified as threats to the rough frog. Future development in south-eastern Queensland may also pose a threat. Direct human impact, urbanisation, tourism and inappropriate catchment management, including the degradation of water quality are also threats to the persistence of this species.
