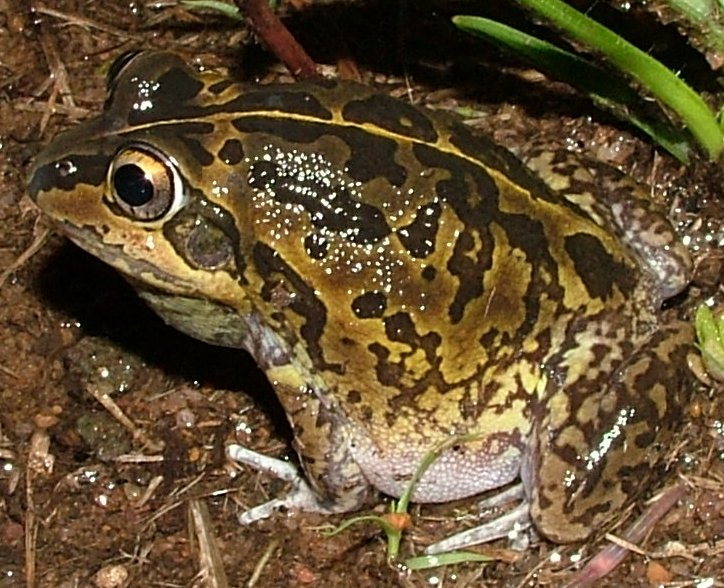

Conservation status
- Least Concern (IUCN 3.1)

Scientific classification
- Kingdom: Animalia
- Phylum: Chordata
- Class: Amphibia
- Order: Anura
- Family: Pelodryadidae
- Genus: Cyclorana
- Species: C. brevipes

Binomial name
- Cyclorana brevipes (Peters, 1871)
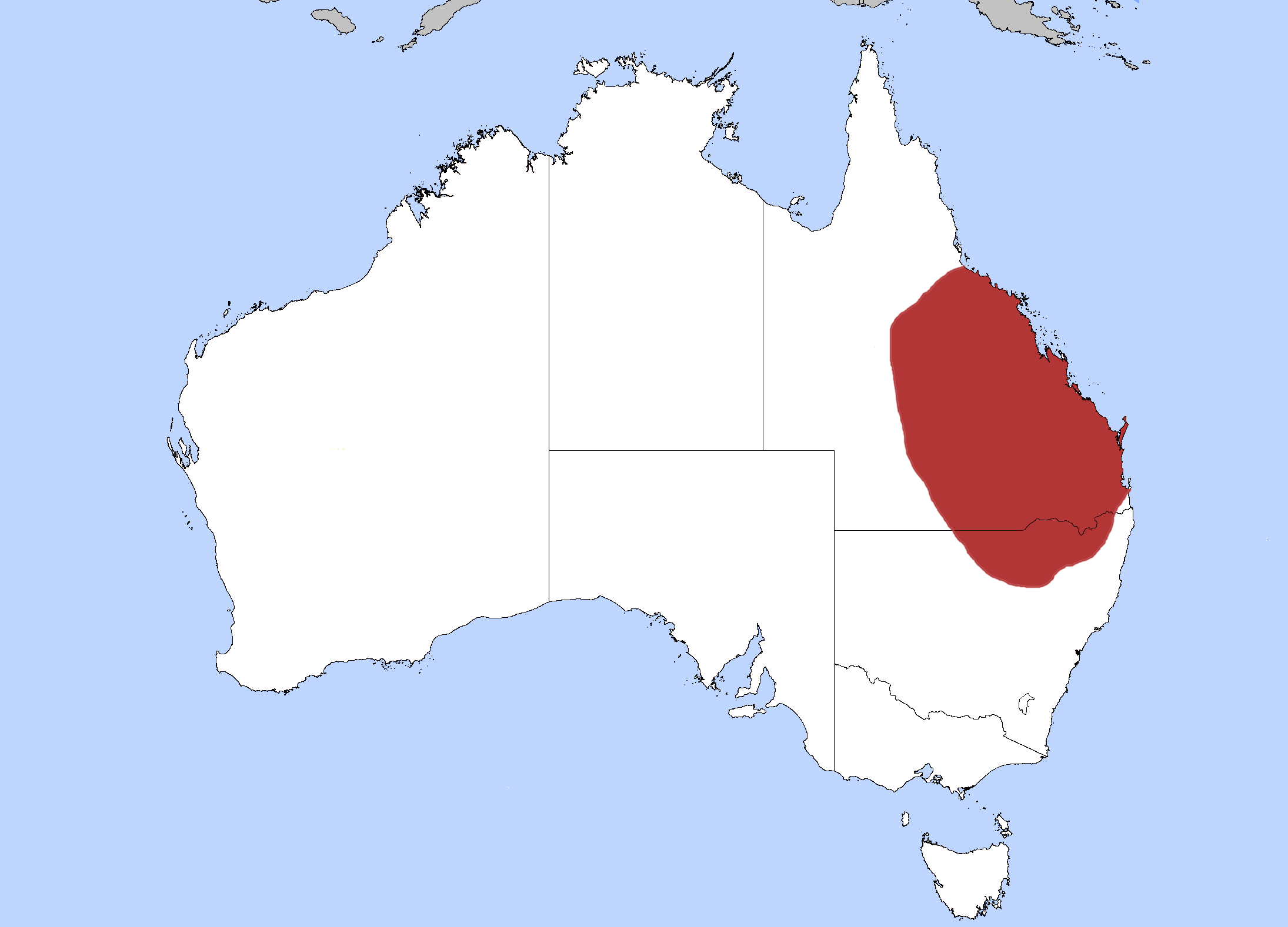
- Distribution of the short-footed frog

Synonyms
- Ranoidea brevipes (Peters, 1871); Litoria brevipes

= Short-footed frog =

Species of amphibian

The short-footed frog (Cyclorana brevipes) is a small, burrowing species of frog native to eastern Queensland, Australia.

== Description ==
The short-footed frog is a small, rotund frog with comparatively large head and eyes. The dorsal surface varies from dull brown to sandy yellow, and has large dark, blotches. The ventral surface is white with dark markings. Most frogs have a silvery, brown stripe along the centre of their back. A dark band extends from the front of the snout, through the eyes, and tympanum and finishing at the shoulder.

The tympanum is visible; the fingers are unwebbed, and the toes partially webbed.

== Ecology and behaviour ==
The short-footed frog habits dry forest and grassland, where it burrows underground for most of the year. During times of rain, the frogs will emerge from their burrows, and congregate around flooded clay pans. The males will call from the edge of the water; the call is a drawn out growl. The eggs are laid in large clumps within the water. The tadpoles develop quickly in warm water to avoid it drying before metamorphosis.
