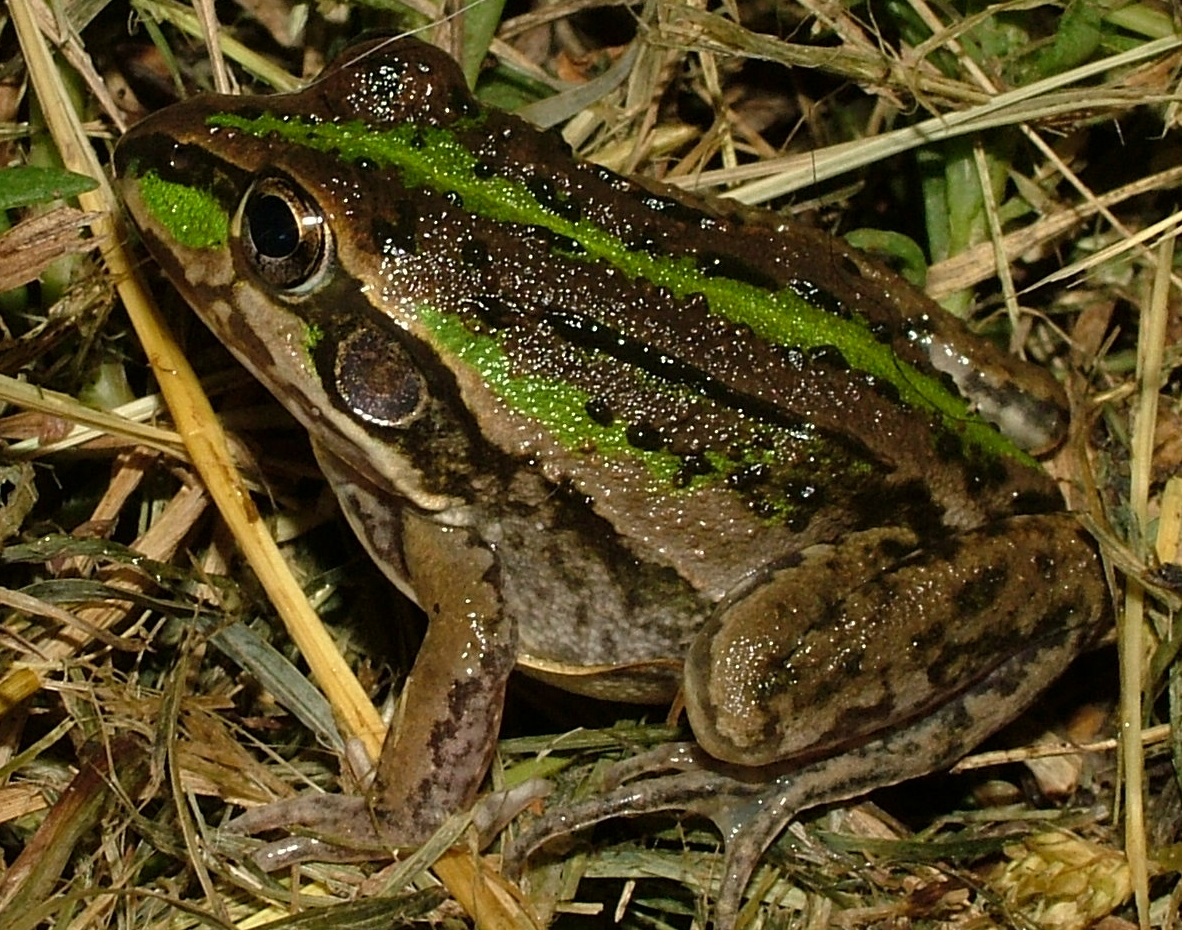

Conservation status
- Least Concern (IUCN 3.1)

Scientific classification
- Kingdom: Animalia
- Phylum: Chordata
- Class: Amphibia
- Order: Anura
- Family: Pelodryadidae
- Genus: Cyclorana
- Species: C. alboguttata

Binomial name
- Cyclorana alboguttata (Günther, 1867)
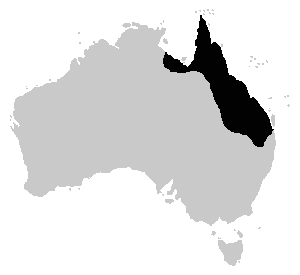
- Range of the striped burrowing frog

Synonyms
- Chiroleptes alboguttatus (Günther, 1867); Cyclorana alboguttatus (Günther, 1867); Litoria alboguttata (Günther, 1867); Brendanura alboguttata (Günther, 1867); Dryopsophus alboguttatus (Günther, 1867)

= Striped burrowing frog =

Species of Australian amphibian

The striped burrowing frog (Cyclorana alboguttata) is a species of burrowing frog in the subfamily Pelodryadinae of the family Hylidae. It occurs throughout much of Australia, from northern New South Wales, through eastern and northern Queensland and into eastern Northern Territory. This species was once included in the genus Litoria or Cyclorana.

== Description ==
The female of this species grows up to 85 millimetres (3.3 in) in length and the male can reach an adult length of 70 millimetres (2.8 in). It is brown, olive or green dorsally, with darker blotches. There is usually a pale yellow or yellow-green stripe down the back, and a dark streak runs from the snout, through the eye and the tympanum, breaking up down the flanks. This stripe has lateral skin fold above it. The backs of the thighs are dark, almost black, with large white, with some flecks brown on the throat and chest. The skin of the back has scattered warts and ridges. The belly is granular, but the throat and chest are smooth. The toes are half webbed. The tympanum is distinct.

== Ecology and behaviour ==
R. alboguttata lives in woodlands, grassy and cleared areas. It is usually only seen around temporary pools and water-filled claypans. The species is active by day and night. This frog is known to go through a period of torpor when resources are scant. University of Queensland researchers have discovered that their cell metabolism changes during a dormancy period, allowing the frogs to maximise the use of their limited energy resources without depleting them completely. This discovery could prove to have important medical applications, particularly regarding obesity.

=== Reproduction ===
Males call from around the grassy edges of temporary pools and ditches. They are often heard by day, and usually seen only after heavy summer rain. The call is a rapid "quacking" made from the ground or shallow water and eggs are laid in clumps near the waters edge.

== See also ==
This species may be confused with Cyclorana australis but can be distinguished by the lateral skin folds on either side of the dorsal surface.
