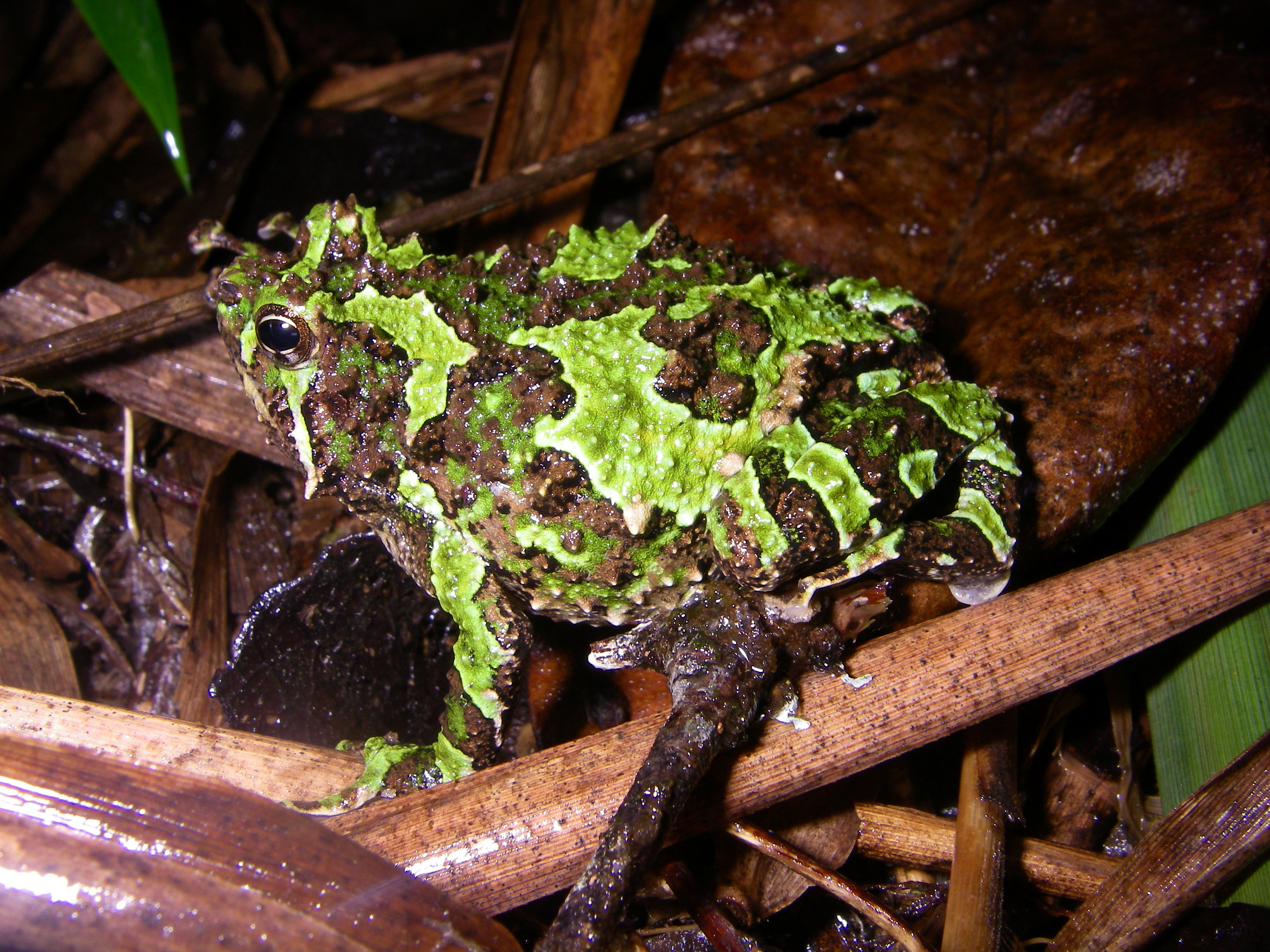

Conservation status
- Least Concern (IUCN 3.1)
- CITES Appendix II

Scientific classification
- Kingdom: Animalia
- Phylum: Chordata
- Class: Amphibia
- Order: Anura
- Family: Microhylidae
- Genus: Scaphiophryne
- Species: S. spinosa

Binomial name
- Scaphiophryne spinosa Steindachner, 1882

= Scaphiophryne spinosa =

Species of frog

Scaphiophryne spinosa is a species of frog in the family Microhylidae. It is endemic to eastern Madagascar. It has been considered synonym of Scaphiophryne marmorata, but a revision in 2002 restored its species status. It inhabits pristine rainforests, swampy forests, forest edges, and degraded forests; it is absent from very open areas. Habitat loss is a threat to this species.
