= Main's frog =

Conservation status
- Least Concern (IUCN 3.1)

Scientific classification
- Kingdom: Animalia
- Phylum: Chordata
- Class: Amphibia
- Order: Anura
- Family: Pelodryadidae
- Genus: Cyclorana
- Species: C. maini

Binomial name
- Cyclorana maini (Tyler & Martin, 1977)

Synonyms
- Ranoidea maini Tyler and Martin, 1977; Litoria maini (Tyler and Martin, 1977)

Species of amphibian

Main's frog (Cyclorana maini) is a species of frog in the family Pelodryadidae. It is endemic to western and central Australia. The frog is named after Professor Bert Main of the University of Western Australia, a pioneer of southern Western Australia frogs.

== Description ==
Its skin may vary from pale grey-brown, olive-brown, dull green on its back, with darker patches. The back is smooth or slightly rough or warty in appearance. Look for the distinct pale stripe that runs along the spine. There is often a dark lateral head stripe.

The male frogs breeding call sounds like the bleating of sheep.

The tadpoles of the Main's frog are fairly large, varying in colour from orange-gold, copper pink over a grey base, dense grey-gold or dull gold with dark speckling.

== Distribution and habitat ==
Usually found in temporary pools in watercourses, claypans and other short-lived bodies of water, its habitat also include open grassland, lightly forested areas, tropical dry lowland grassland, intermittent rivers, swamps, intermittent freshwater marshes and stream beds in temporary flood plains.

This water-holding frog has adapted to desert conditions. This species lives in some of the harshest country in the arid region of western and central Australia. Grouped together with other burrowing frogs, it survives the dry periods by absorbing water into its body, burrowing deep underground, and encasing itself in a watertight bag (cocoon), awaiting the next major rain fall.

== Life-cycle and behaviour ==
Some environmental situations, such as the tadpoles living in a small amounts of water, which would naturally heat to higher temperatures, is known to trigger the tadpoles to develop at a faster rate, developing into adults frogs within 14 days.

This seemingly hurried life-cycle from egg to tadpole to adult frogs is a common feature of frogs from the arid and desert region, as water when it does fall is usually only around for a brief period.
