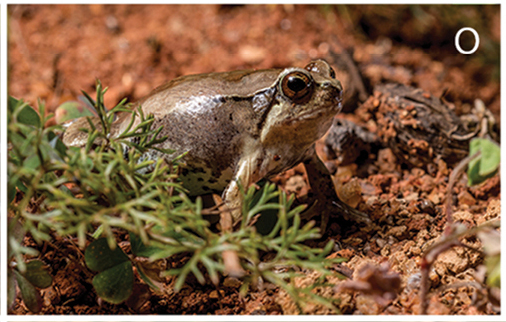
- Scaphiophryne calcarata

Conservation status
- Least Concern (IUCN 3.1)

Scientific classification
- Kingdom: Animalia
- Phylum: Chordata
- Class: Amphibia
- Order: Anura
- Family: Microhylidae
- Genus: Scaphiophryne
- Species: S. calcarata

Binomial name
- Scaphiophryne calcarata (Mocquard, 1895)

= Scaphiophryne calcarata =

Species of amphibian

Scaphiophryne calcarata, Moquard's Burrowing Frog, is a species of frog in the family Microhylidae. It is endemic to Madagascar. Its natural habitats are subtropical or tropical dry forests, dry savanna, moist savanna, subtropical or tropical dry shrubland, subtropical or tropical dry lowland grassland, intermittent freshwater marshes, arable land, and urban areas. The species is adaptable and is not affected by deforestation.
