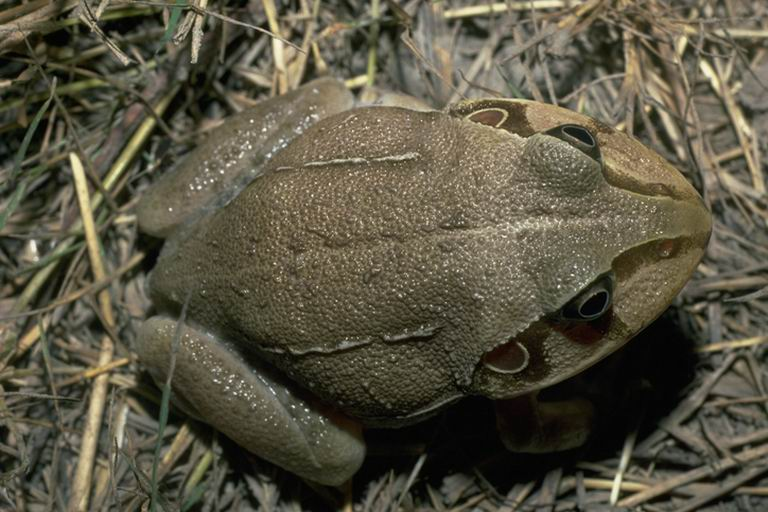

Conservation status
- Least Concern (IUCN 3.1)

Scientific classification
- Kingdom: Animalia
- Phylum: Chordata
- Class: Amphibia
- Order: Anura
- Family: Pelodryadidae
- Genus: Cyclorana
- Species: C. novaehollandiae

Binomial name
- Cyclorana novaehollandiae Steindachner, (1867)
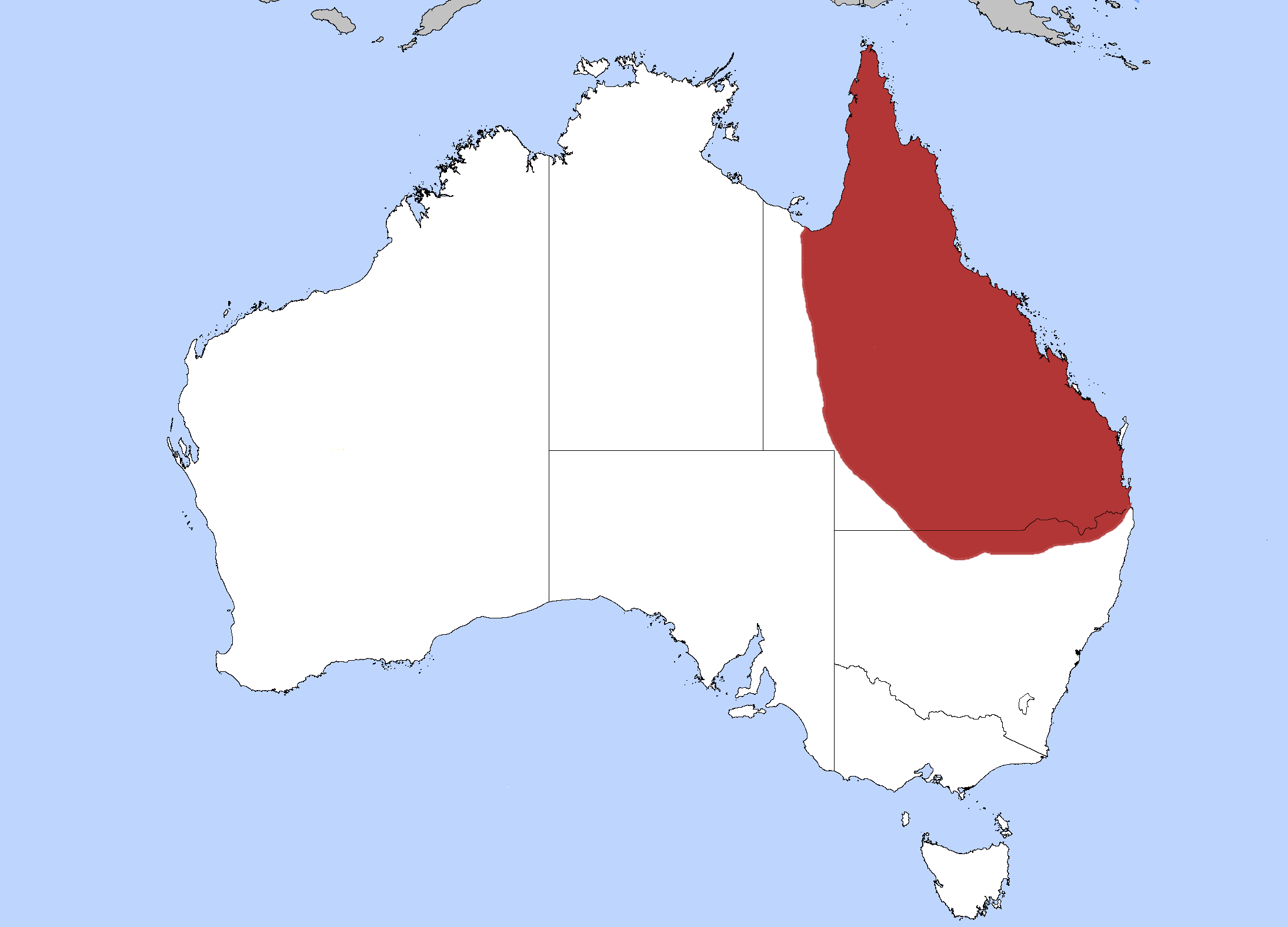
- Distribution of the New Holland frog

Synonyms
- Ranoidea novaehollandiae Steindachner, 1867; Litoria novaehollandiae

= New Holland frog =

Species of amphibian

The New Holland frog (Cyclorana novaehollandiae), also known as wide-mouthed frog, is a large species of burrowing frog native to northern New South Wales and the eastern portion of Queensland, Australia.

== Description ==
The New Holland frog is a large species, reaching a maximum size of 100 mm. It is normally pale grey, brown, or yellowish, occasionally with darker blotches. The belly is white and the throat is speckled. A dark stripe runs from the snout, through the Tympanum, and down to the shoulder. Normally, a dark band runs from under the eye down to the mouth. The thighs are bluish in colour. The toes are slightly webbed.

== Ecology and behaviour ==
This species is associated with black-soil plains and flood plains near rivers. They inhabit dams, ditches, and claypans in woodland and grassland. Being a burrowing species, they spend extended periods underground to survive dry conditions. After heavy rains fall during spring, summer, and early autumn, frogs become very active and males make a deep "waah" call from in or beside water.

Up to 1000 eggs per clump are laid in a nonfoamy masses in shallow water. These clumps are initially floating, but later sink. An average of 4906 eggs are laid. Tadpoles are large, reaching 95–100 mm and are rotund and golden brown. Tadpoles' lifespan is 4 to 6 weeks and metamorphs measure 35–40 mm. They resemble the adults, although they may be bright green in colour.
