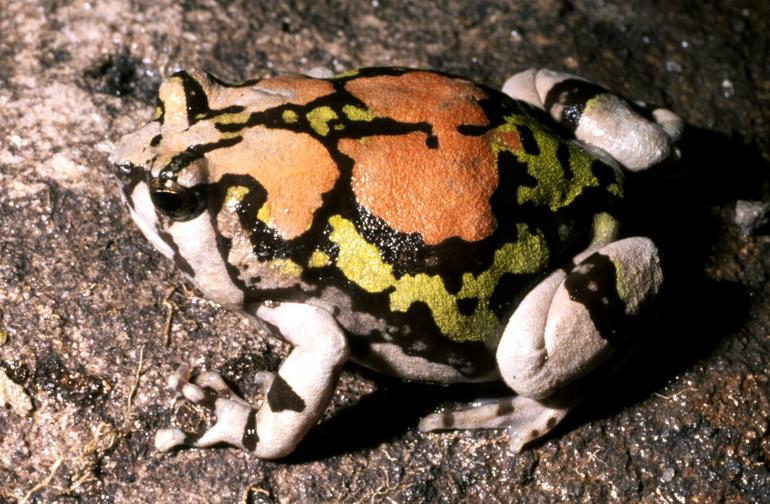

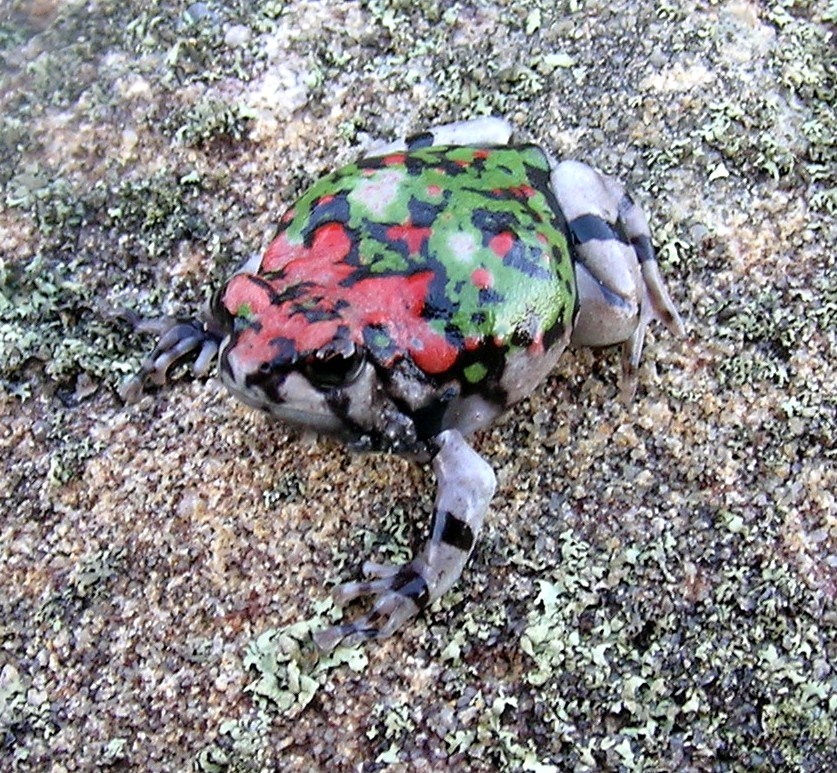
- Two variants; the exact colour hue and pattern varies in this species

Conservation status
- Endangered (IUCN 3.1)
- CITES Appendix II

Scientific classification
- Kingdom: Animalia
- Phylum: Chordata
- Class: Amphibia
- Order: Anura
- Family: Microhylidae
- Genus: Scaphiophryne
- Species: S. gottlebei

Binomial name
- Scaphiophryne gottlebei Busse and Böhme, 1992

= Scaphiophryne gottlebei =

Rainbow burrowing frog

Species of amphibian

Scaphiophryne gottlebei, commonly known as the Malagasy rainbow frog, ornate hopper, rainbow burrowing frog, red rain frog or Gottlebe's narrow-mouthed frog, is one of the most highly decorated frogs from Madagascar. The primary threats to this endangered species are habitat loss and capture for the pet trade (now illegal).

== Description ==
The Malagasy rainbow frog is a small, roundish, brightly coloured species with a distinctive white, orange–red, green and black pattern on the back, each area of which is clearly delineated. The skin on the back is very smooth, but that of the grey belly is a little bit rough. The snout is rounded, the eyes are prominent but the tympani are inconspicuous. The limbs are short and robust and the digits of the hand have large tips and the hind feet are webbed. Adapted for both underground and climbing lifestyles, the Malagasy rainbow frog has horny tubercles on the underside of the hind feet to help with burrowing, and claws on the forefeet for clinging to vertical canyon walls. With a snout–vent length of 2.6 to 4 cm (1.0–1.6 in), females average larger and reach a larger maximum size than males which measure 2 to 3.4 cm (0.8–1.3 in).

== Distribution and habitat ==
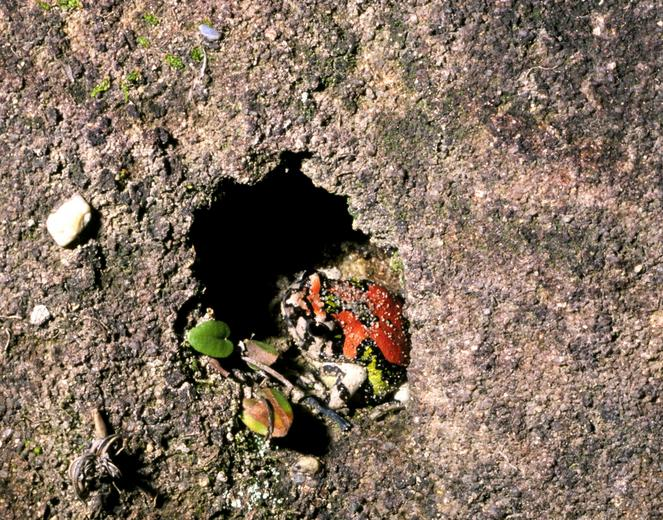
This frog often spends time in holes or crevices in rocks

The Malagasy rainbow frog is endemic to the Isalo Massif at an altitude of 700–1,000 m (2,300–3,300 ft) in the central part of southern Madagascar, including the Isalo National Park and areas south of it. Its primary habitat is narrow canyons where the conditions tend to be cool for the tropics, relatively dark (resulting in little or no vegetation) and very humid. The typical temperature in its habitat is 19–22 °C (66–72 °F), but overall varies from about 13 to 35 °C (55–95 °F). It shares its range with another colourful and endangered frog, the blue-legged mantella (Mantella expectata), which occurs in the same habitat but prefers more open, sun-exposed areas. The Malagasy rainbow frog digs into the sandy areas bordering the streams or spends its time in small holes or crevices in the rock walls. At night it may climb on the rock walls, reaching several meters high. Although rare outside its primary canyon habitat, it can also be found in open rocky areas, mostly in dry forest.

== Behaviour ==
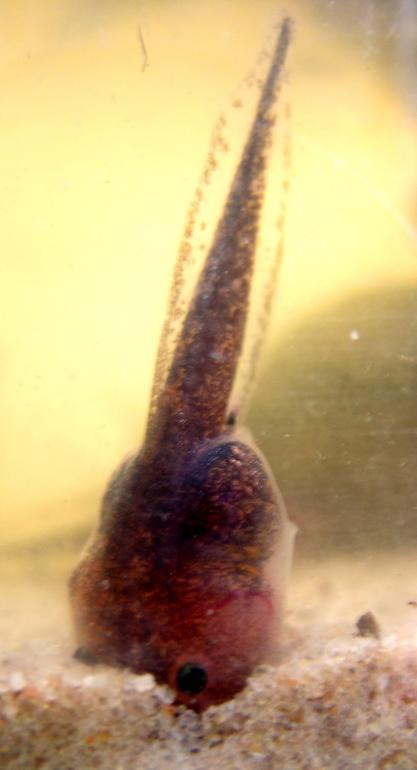
Tadpole with head in the sand, a typical position when feeding on detritus

The Malagasy rainbow frog is an explosive breeder (meaning that the breeding season is short and begins suddenly) that breeds in groups in November–December just after the first heavy rainfall in the early rainy season. A group often consists of a few tens of individuals and usually more males than females. Males call from rock walls or the surface of temporary pools and it is in these that the eggs are laid, which already hatch into tadpoles after about three days. The tadpoles have a stout oval body with flattened underside. They appear black in the daytime but turn brownish-grey at night. In the wild they are detritivores and filter feeders, although captives have been reared from Gosner stage 25 to near metamorphosis on fish food. They have the unusual habit of spending the day with their heads submerged in the sediment of the bottom, feeding on detritus, and their tails projecting at an angle. During the night the tadpoles swim around, apparently filter feeding particles from the open water. Many tadpoles are swept away by torrents during the rainy season and may complete their metamorphosis elsewhere. Recently metamorphosed young frogs are about half to one-third the size of adults, but otherwise similar. In addition to inactive dispersal of the tadpoles by water currents, adults may actively disperse, especially during cold weather. The species is quite short-lived, typically only reaching an age of 2 years.

== Conservation status ==
The IUCN lists the Malagasy rainbow frog as "Endangered"; it was formerly (from 2004 to 2008) "Critically Endangered", but this was reduced when it was found to be more widespread than previously thought and locally common. Although it is common in some areas, it has a restricted range and its population is believed to be decreasing. The major threats are habitat loss and over-collection for the pet trade. Primary threats to the habitat are wood extraction, fire, overgrazing by livestock, mining and possibly disturbance by tourists. As recent as the 2000s (decade), thousands were captured every year for the pet trade. When added to CITES Appendix II, an export quota was introduced. By 2014, it had been lowered to 0 (zero), making export of wild-caught individuals illegal. There are indications that the snake Leioheterodon modestus possibly is an important natural predator of this frog.
