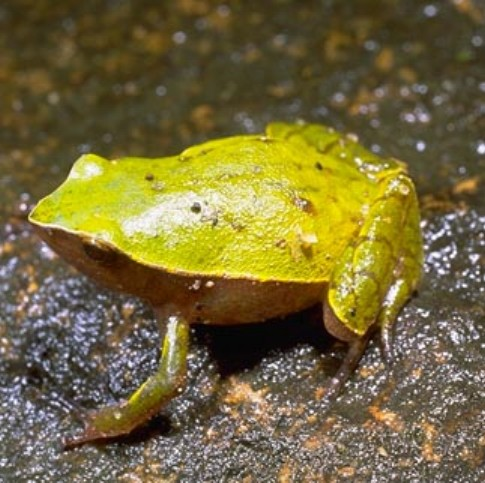
- Plethodontohyla notosticta

Scientific classification
- Kingdom: Animalia
- Phylum: Chordata
- Class: Amphibia
- Order: Anura
- Family: Microhylidae
- Subfamily: Cophylinae
- Genus: Plethodontohyla; Boulenger, 1882

Type species
- Callula notosticta Günther, 1877

Diversity
- 11 species

Synonyms
- Callula Günther, 1877 (partial); Mantipus Peters, 1883 (partial); Phrynocara Peters, 1883; Mantiphrys Mocquard, 1895

= Plethodontohyla =

Genus of amphibians

Plethodontohyla is a genus of microhylid frogs endemic to Madagascar.

== Species ==
There are at present 11 species:

- Plethodontohyla alluaudi (Mocquard, 1901)
- Plethodontohyla bipunctata (Guibé, 1974)
- Plethodontohyla brevipes Boulenger, 1882
- Plethodontohyla fonetana Glaw, Köhler, Bora, Rabibisoa, Ramilijaona, and Vences, 2007
- Plethodontohyla guentheri Glaw and Vences, 2007
- Plethodontohyla inguinalis Boulenger, 1882
- Plethodontohyla laevis (Boettger, 1913)
- Plethodontohyla mihanika Vences, Raxworthy, Nussbaum, and Glaw, 2003
- Plethodontohyla notosticta (Günther, 1877)
- Plethodontohyla ocellata Noble and Parker, 1926
- Plethodontohyla tuberata (Peters, 1883)

== Taxonomy ==
The following species were formerly classed as Plethodontoyhla species but have since been moved to the genus Rhombophryne:

- Rhombophryne coronata (Vences & Glaw, 2003)
- Rhombophryne guentherpetersi (Guibé, 1974)
- Rhombophryne laevipes (Mocquard, 1895)
- Rhombophryne minuta (Guibé, 1975)
- Rhombophryne serratopalpebrosa (Guibé, 1975)

The taxon Plethodontohyla alluaudi was moved to Rhombophryne by Frost et al. in 2006, but was transferred back to Plethodontohyla after review of its taxonomic status in early 2018, along with the newly resurrected Plethodontohyla laevis. In addition, the species Rhombophryne matavy was erroneously transferred to Plethodontohyla in 2016 based on a misidentified DNA sequence, and was later transferred back to Rhombophryne.
