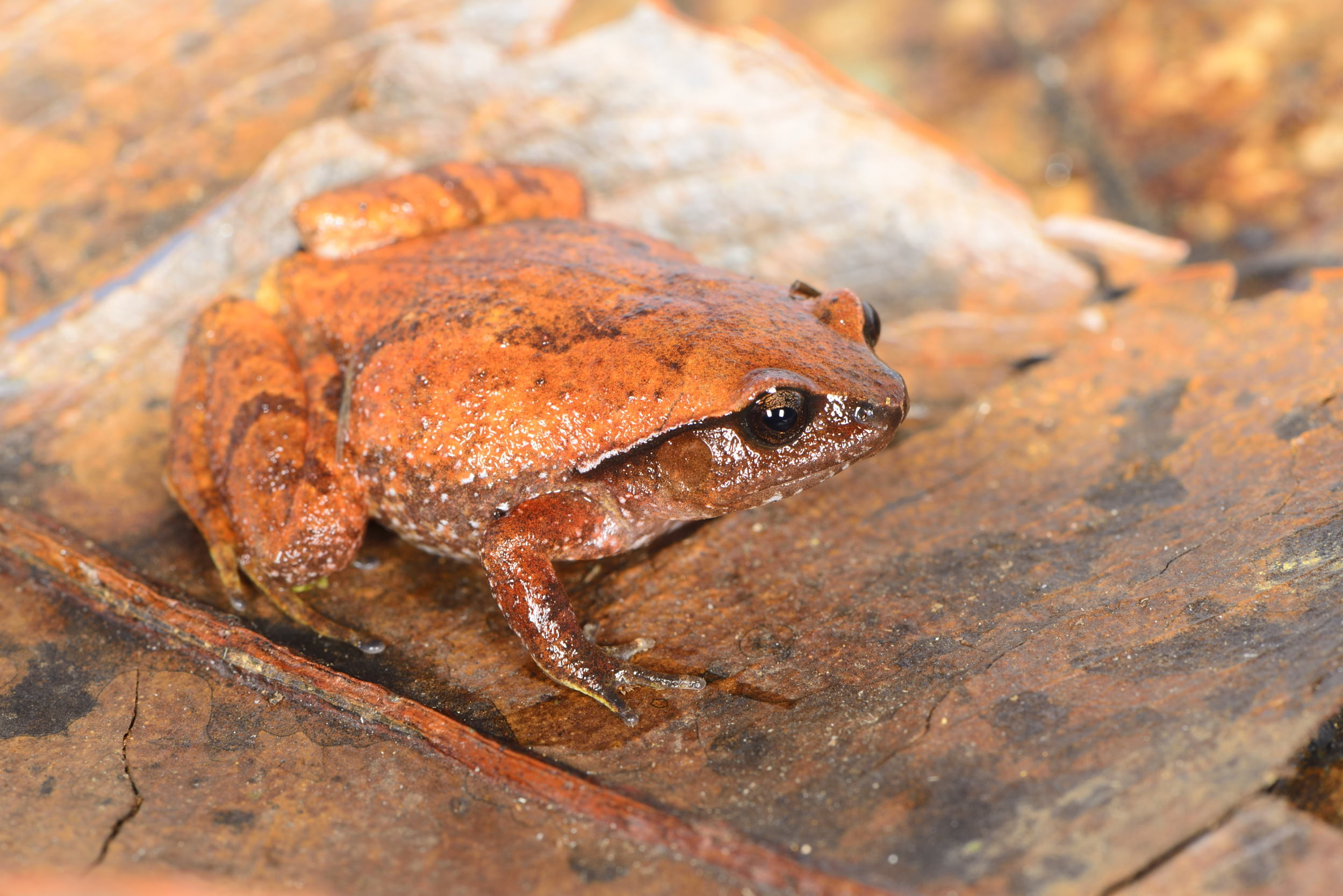

Conservation status
- Endangered (IUCN 3.1)

Scientific classification
- Kingdom: Animalia
- Phylum: Chordata
- Class: Amphibia
- Order: Anura
- Family: Microhylidae
- Subfamily: Cophylinae
- Genus: Rhombophryne
- Species: R. botabota

Binomial name
- Rhombophryne botabota Scherz, Glaw, Vences, Andreone & Crottini, 2016

= Rhombophryne botabota =

Species of amphibian

Rhombophryne botabota is a medium-sized species of frogs of the Madagascar endemic microhylid subfamily Cophylinae. It is found in the montane rainforests of northern Madagascar. It was described in 2016 from seven specimens.

== Description ==
Rhombophryne botabota measure up to 32.2 mm (1.27 in). In life, the dorsal skin is fairly smooth in texture. The lateral head is different in colour from the dorsum, which is unusual among Rhombophryne species. The species' dorsal colouration is variable, sometimes including dark, chevron-like markings, and in other cases being fairly uniformly brown.

The skeleton of the species was briefly described by Scherz et al. in 2016 based on micro-CT scans of two specimens. Notably the species possesses curved clavicles and a sigmoidal set of vomerine teeth.

== Range and distribution ==
Rhombophryne botabota is endemic to northern Madagascar, being found on the Marojejy massif, as well as Makira Natural Park and Ambolokopatrika from altitudes between roughly 860 and 1330 m above sea level.

== Habitat and ecology ==
Rhombophryne botabota is found in montane rainforest at high altitude (~860–1330 m above sea level) on several northern massifs in Madagascar. Like most Rhombophryne species, R. botabota is semi-fossorial. The stomach of one specimen contained a small snail of the family Subulinidae.

The advertisement call is a series of honking notes, each around 505 ms in duration, with roughly two-second delays between calls. The call's dominant frequency is around 1272 Hz. The calls lack pulses. These calls are higher in frequency than the similar Rhombophryne alluaudi. It probably has nidicolous non-feeding tadpoles and exhibits some degree of parental care, but this has not been observed. Other mating habits such as amplexus, clutch size and deposition site, and developmental duration are unknown.
