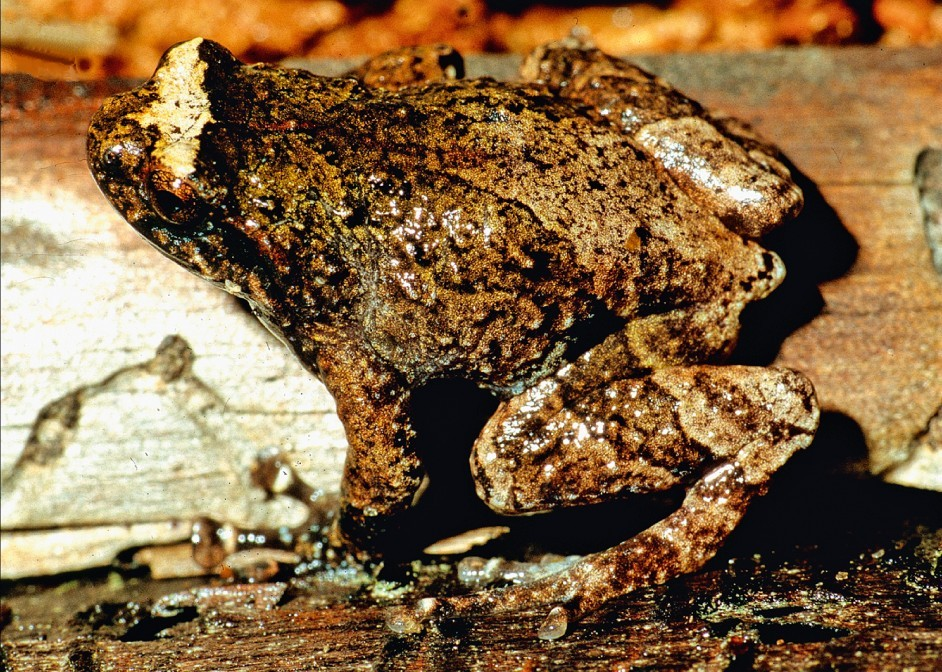

Conservation status
- Critically Endangered (IUCN 3.1)

Scientific classification
- Kingdom: Animalia
- Phylum: Chordata
- Class: Amphibia
- Order: Anura
- Family: Microhylidae
- Subfamily: Cophylinae
- Genus: Anodonthyla
- Species: A. vallani

Binomial name
- Anodonthyla vallani Vences, Glaw, Köhler, and Wollenberg, 2010

= Anodonthyla vallani =

Species of amphibian

Anodonthyla vallani is a species of microhylid frog. The frog was discovered in the Réserve Spéciale d’Ambohitantely in the central highlands of Madagascar and was previously confused with Anodonthyla nigrigularis. This species is only found in high elevation forests of the Ambohitantely Reserve. In 2010 Miguel Vences named this narrow-mouthed frog genus anodonthyla vallani, in honor of Denis Vallan.
