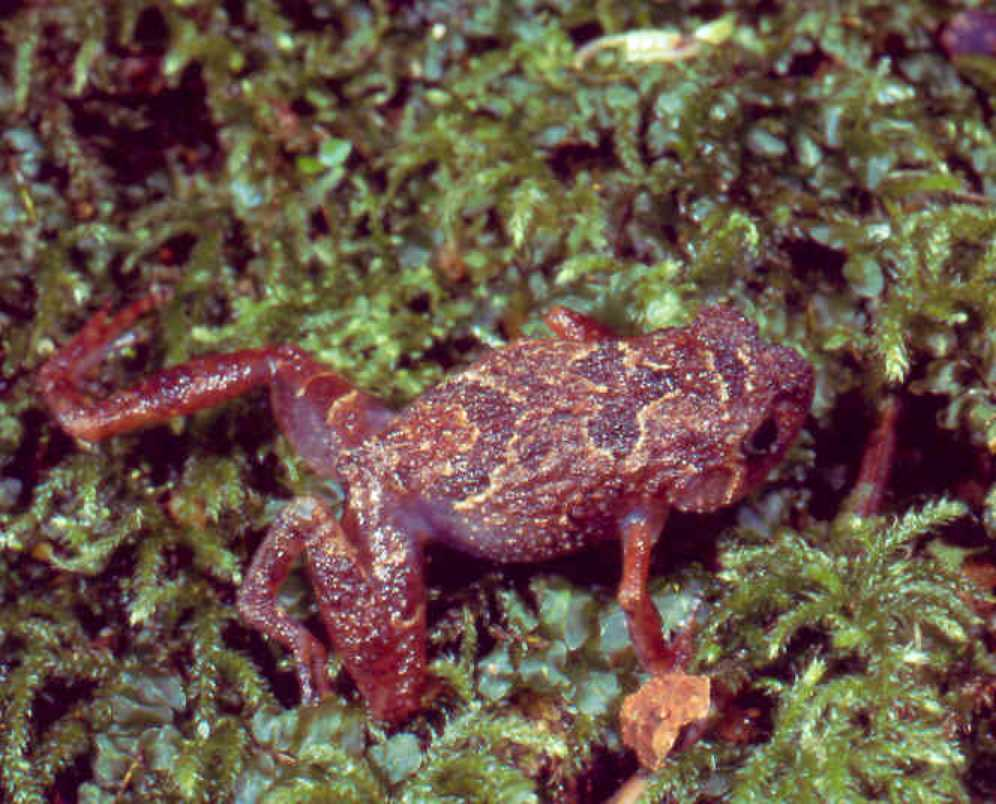

Conservation status
- Endangered (IUCN 3.1)

Scientific classification
- Kingdom: Animalia
- Phylum: Chordata
- Class: Amphibia
- Order: Anura
- Family: Microhylidae
- Subfamily: Cophylinae
- Genus: Rhombophryne
- Species: R. serratopalpebrosa

Binomial name
- Rhombophryne serratopalpebrosa (Guibé, 1975)

Synonyms
- Mantipus serratopalpebrosus Guibé, 1975; Plethodontohyla serratopalpebrosa (Guibé, 1975)

= Rhombophryne serratopalpebrosa =

Species of amphibian

Rhombophryne serratopalpebrosa is a species of frog of the Madagascar endemic microhylid subfamily Cophylinae. Genetic evidence revealed that it is a species complex, in need of resolution. This work has made significant progress, and five related species have been described from this complex between 2014 and 2017. It is threatened by habitat loss.

== Range and distribution ==
Range of Rhombophryne serratopalpebrosa.

Rhombophryne serratopalpebrosa is endemic to the Marojejy massif in northern Madagascar. At present it is only known with certainty from the holotype specimen. Its type locality is at high elevation on the Marojejy massif. Records from outside of Marojejy National Park may refer to other species, and at present this species has only been confirmed from this single location.

== Description ==
The holotype of Rhombophryne serratopalpebrosa measures roughly 29 mm (1.1 in) long. Its fingers and toes are unwebbed, and its dorsal skin is grainy. It possesses four spines above each eye, the posterior-most of which is indistinct.

== Taxonomy ==
Rhombophryne serratopalpebrosa was described as a member of the genus Plethodontohyla by Guibé in 1975. Plethodontohyla serratopalpebrosa was transferred to the genus Rhombophryne by Wollenberg and colleagues. The original description was brief, and the species was re-described by Scherz and colleagues in 2014 to facilitate a review of the R. serratopalpebrosa species complex.

The closest related species of Rhombophryne share also the superciliary spines: Rhombophryne vaventy, R. coronata, R. ornata, R. tany, R. regalis, and R. diadema — together these species form the "Rhombophryne serratopalpebrosa species group". The closest relative is suspected to be R. regalis, which is smaller but shares certain morphological characters such as an s-shaped fold posterior to the nostril, but their relationship is uncertain due to the lack of genetic material from R. serratopalepbrosa.
