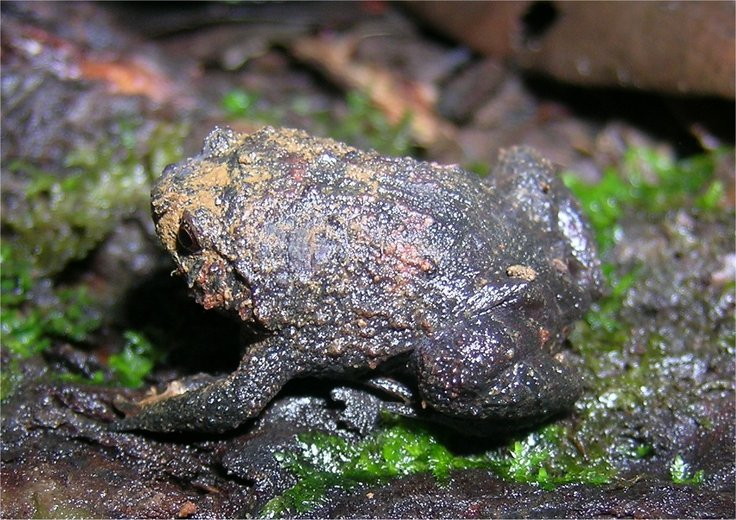

Conservation status
- Near Threatened (IUCN 3.1)

Scientific classification
- Kingdom: Animalia
- Phylum: Chordata
- Class: Amphibia
- Order: Anura
- Family: Microhylidae
- Subfamily: Cophylinae
- Genus: Rhombophryne
- Species: R. coudreaui

Binomial name
- Rhombophryne coudreaui (Angel, 1938)

Synonyms
- Plethodontohyla coudreaui Angel, 1938

= Rhombophryne coudreaui =

Species of frog

Rhombophryne coudreaui is a species of frog in the family Microhylidae. It is endemic to northeastern Madagascar. The specific name coudreaui honours Jean Coudreau, a colonial forestry administrator in Madagascar who collected the holotype. Common names Coudreau's frog and Betampona digging frog have been coined for it.

== Description ==
Females can reach 28 mm (1.1 in) in snout–vent length. The overall appearance is stout with short legs. The snout is short. The tympanum is indistinct and measures about 3/4 of the eye diameter. The fingers and toes show traces of webbing. Skin on the back is granular. The dorsum is light brown. It is similar to Rhombophryne testudo but lacks the barbels on the lower lip of the latter.

== Habitat and conservation ==
Rhombophryne coudreaui occurs in rainforests, including coastal rainforests, at elevations of 200–1,000 m (660–3,280 ft) above sea level. It is a fossorial and terrestrial species. It is threatened by habitat loss and deterioration, particularly in coastal rainforests. It occurs in the Betampona Reserve and Marojejy National Park.
