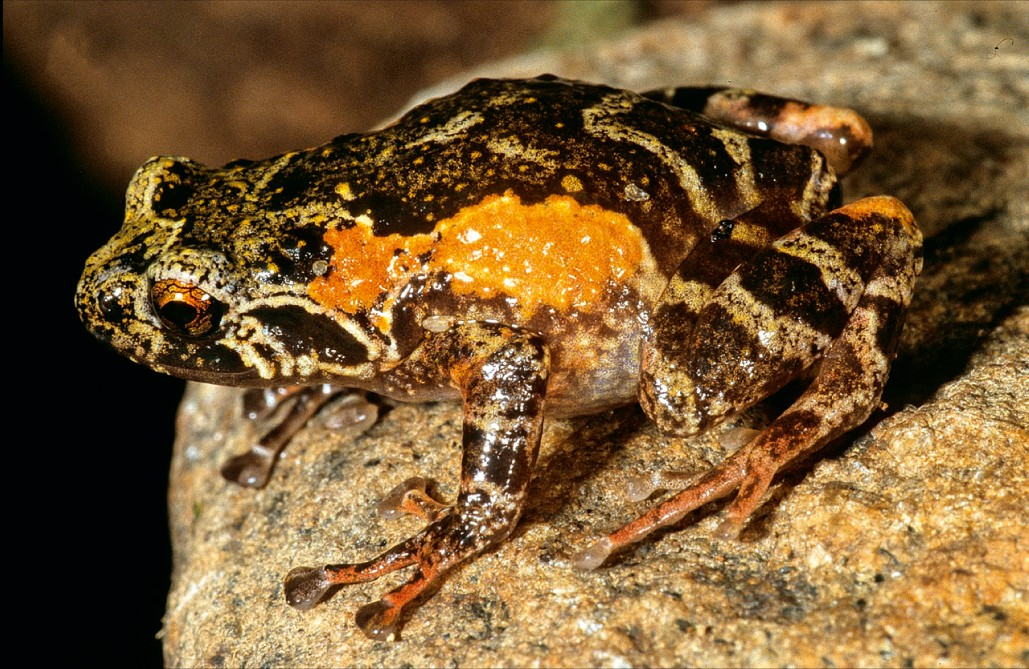

Conservation status
- Endangered (IUCN 3.1)

Scientific classification
- Kingdom: Animalia
- Phylum: Chordata
- Class: Amphibia
- Order: Anura
- Family: Microhylidae
- Subfamily: Cophylinae
- Genus: Anodonthyla
- Species: A. emilei

Binomial name
- Anodonthyla emilei Vences, Glaw, J. Köhler and Wollenberg, 2010

= Anodonthyla emilei =

Species of frog

Anodonthyla emilei is a species of frog in the family Microhylidae. It is endemic to Madagascar. Discovered in Ranomafana National Park in Madagascar in 2003, it has the most divergent call of all Anodonthyla species.

== Etymology ==
A. emilei was named after Emile Rajeriarison, a nature guide at Ranomafana National Park.
