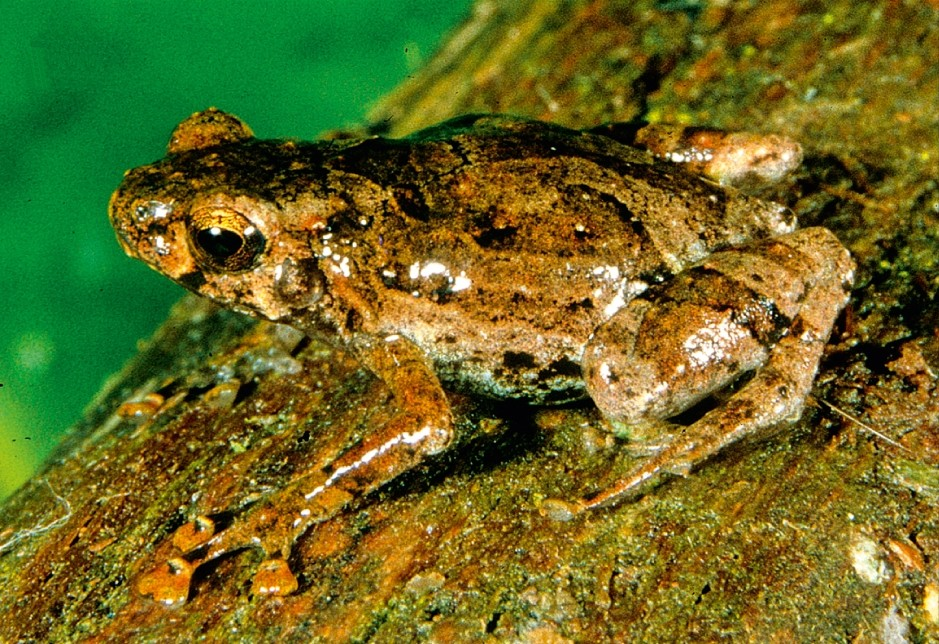

Conservation status
- Data Deficient (IUCN 3.1)

Scientific classification
- Kingdom: Animalia
- Phylum: Chordata
- Class: Amphibia
- Order: Anura
- Family: Microhylidae
- Subfamily: Cophylinae
- Genus: Anodonthyla
- Species: A. pollicaris

Binomial name
- Anodonthyla pollicaris (Boettger, 1913)

= Anodonthyla pollicaris =

Species of amphibian

Anodonthyla pollicaris is a species of microhylid frog. This frog is endemic to Madagascar.
