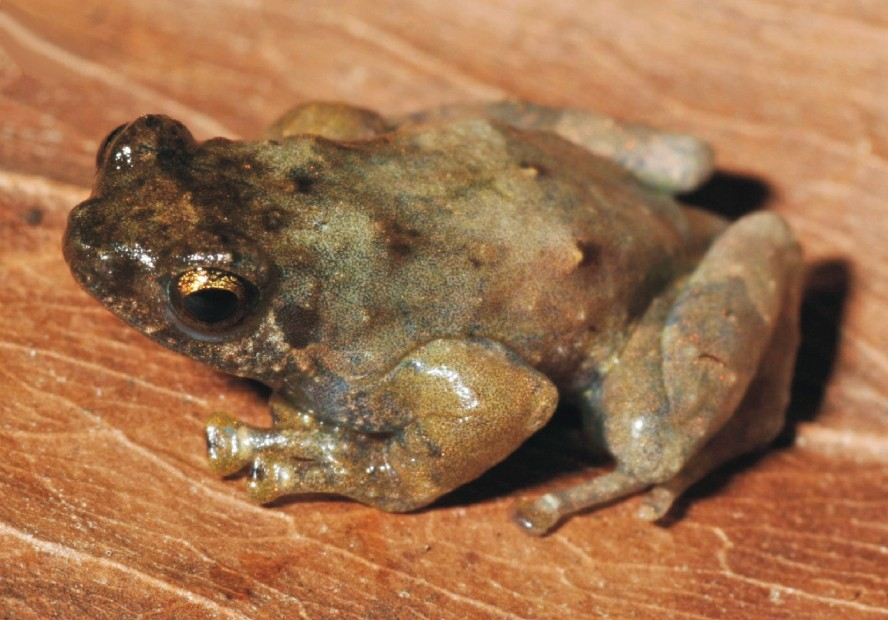

Conservation status
- Critically Endangered (IUCN 3.1)

Scientific classification
- Kingdom: Animalia
- Phylum: Chordata
- Class: Amphibia
- Order: Anura
- Family: Microhylidae
- Subfamily: Cophylinae
- Genus: Anodonthyla
- Species: A. theoi

Binomial name
- Anodonthyla theoi Vences, Glaw, Köhler, and Wollenberg, 2010

= Anodonthyla theoi =

Species of amphibian

Anodonthyla theoi is a species of microhylidae frog. This species is native to Madagascar and can be found in lowland rain forests.
