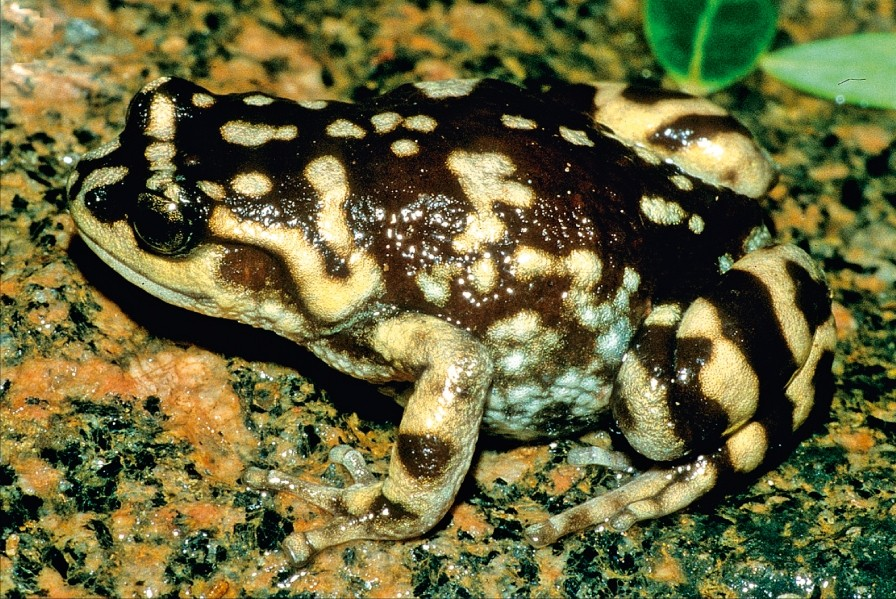
- Anodonthyla montana

Conservation status
- Vulnerable (IUCN 3.1)

Scientific classification
- Kingdom: Animalia
- Phylum: Chordata
- Class: Amphibia
- Order: Anura
- Family: Microhylidae
- Subfamily: Cophylinae
- Genus: Anodonthyla
- Species: A. montana

Binomial name
- Anodonthyla montana Angel, 1925

= Anodonthyla montana =

Species of frog

Anodonthyla montana also known as the Mountain Climbing frog is a species of frog in the family Microhylidae. It is endemic to Madagascar. Its natural habitats are subtropical or tropical high-altitude shrubland, subtropical or tropical high-altitude grassland, and rocky areas.
