= Plethodontohyla bipunctata =

Conservation status
- Least Concern (IUCN 3.1)

Scientific classification
- Kingdom: Animalia
- Phylum: Chordata
- Class: Amphibia
- Order: Anura
- Family: Microhylidae
- Subfamily: Cophylinae
- Genus: Plethodontohyla
- Species: P. bipunctata

Binomial name
- Plethodontohyla bipunctata (Guibé, 1974)

Species of amphibian

Plethodontohyla bipunctata is a species of frog in the family Microhylidae. It is endemic to Madagascar. Its natural habitats are subtropical or tropical moist lowland forests and heavily degraded former forest. It is threatened by habitat loss.
