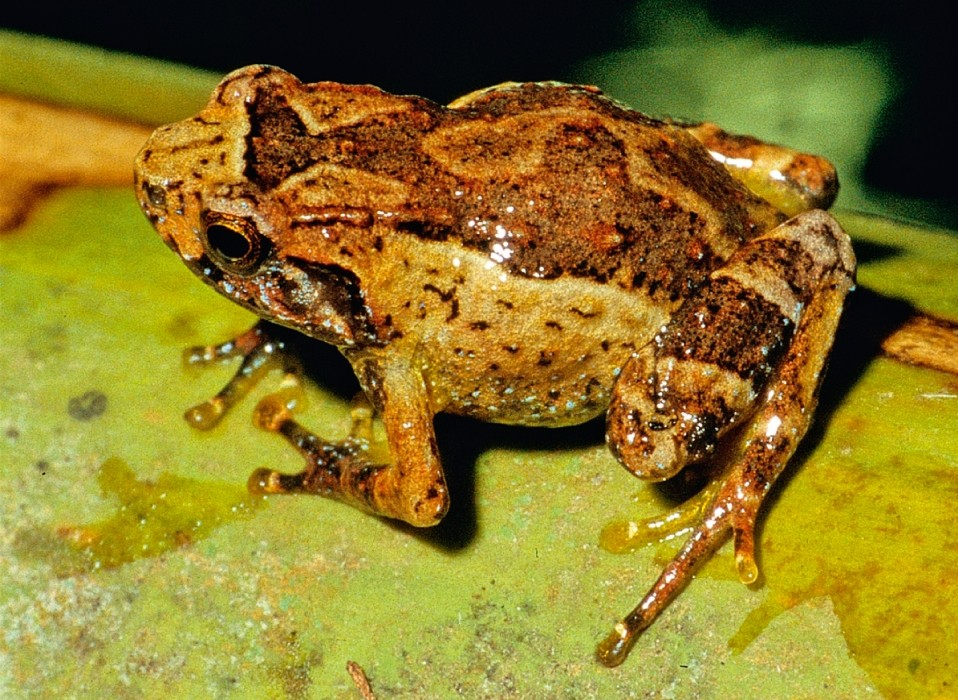
- Anodonthyla jeanbai from Andohahela National Park

Conservation status
- Endangered (IUCN 3.1)

Scientific classification
- Kingdom: Animalia
- Phylum: Chordata
- Class: Amphibia
- Order: Anura
- Family: Microhylidae
- Subfamily: Cophylinae
- Genus: Anodonthyla
- Species: A. jeanbai

Binomial name
- Anodonthyla jeanbai Vences, Glaw, Köhler, and Wollenberg, 2010

= Anodonthyla jeanbai =

Species of amphibian

Anodonthyla jeanbai is an arboreal species of frogs in the family Microhylidae. It is highly polychromatic, and has an extremely isolated phylogenetic position, showing no clear relationships to any other members of the genus Anodonthyla. It is found only in a small higher-elevation area in Madagascar.

== Description ==
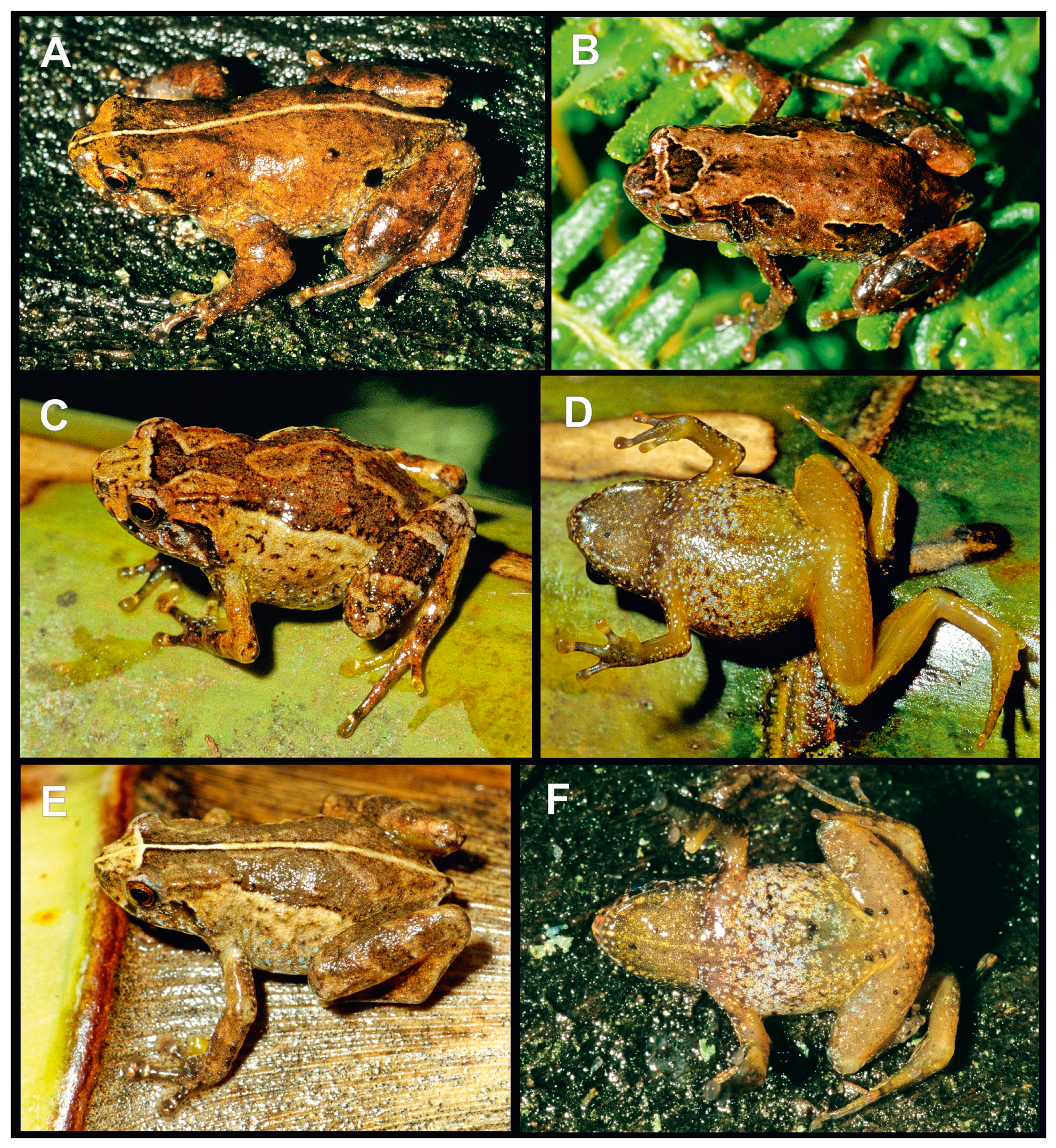
Specimen in life, in dorsolateral and ventral views, all from Andohahela National Park. (A) Holotype specimen ZSM 88/2005; (B-F) paratype specimens, all preserved in the UADBA collection.

A. jeanbai can be distinguished from all other Anodonthyla species in numerous ways, including the presence of a yellowish colouration located on the ventral surfaces, which in some specimens, completely extends over the venter. Another distinction is the tympanum, which is often not as clearly visible as with other species.

This species has a dorsum and posterior part of head that is nearly uniformly brown in colour. The anterior head is a somewhat lighter shade of brown. There is a narrow middorsal line running from the tip of the snout to the cloaca. The inguinal region contains two black spots. The tympanic region is light in colour, and has a dark supratympanic fold at the border. There are no distinct, dark crossbands on the forelimbs, however, on the hindlegs these bands are present. The cloacal region has a blackish colour, while the chest, ventral parts of the limbs, and throat are a dirty yellowish colour. The belly of this species has a similar colour, however it is more grayish.

A. jeanbai is an extremely polychromatic species. In life, the dorsum is light brown. The dorsal surfaces of both the arms and legs are a light reddish-brown colour, all having some indistinct irregular-shaped darker markings.

Many specimens have a somewhat regular dark 'hourglass' pattern located on the scapular region, and may also have small reddish-brown tubercles in a scattered pattern on the dorsum.

== Distribution ==
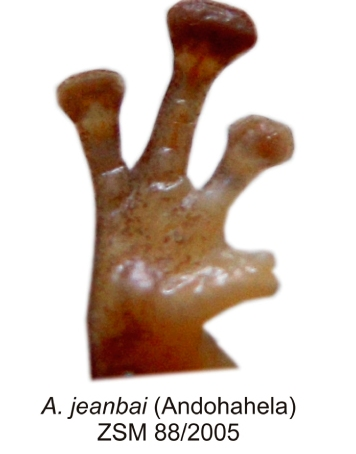
Views of palmar surfaces of male specimen, showing detail of first finger and prepollex.

The species has been found only at a single surveyed site at a relatively high elevation in the Andohahela National Park, which is located at the southern end of Madagascar, in the province of Toliara.

== Habitat ==
This species can be found at higher elevations, in forests with a high bamboo density. They are seen at night, typically 1 to 2 metres high on bamboo trunks.

== Phylogeny ==
In terms of phylogeny, this species is very isolated. I has no clear relationships to any other member of the genus Anodonthyla. It has a genetic 16S divergence of 9.4-12.1% relative to other species.

== Etymology ==
This species is named for the Malagasy herpetologist Jean Baptiste (Jean-Ba) Ramanamanjato. He provided the logistic information that was a crucial part of the expedition to the type locality, an area of the Andohahela National Park, located at higher elevations.

== See also ==
- Amphibians of Madagascar
