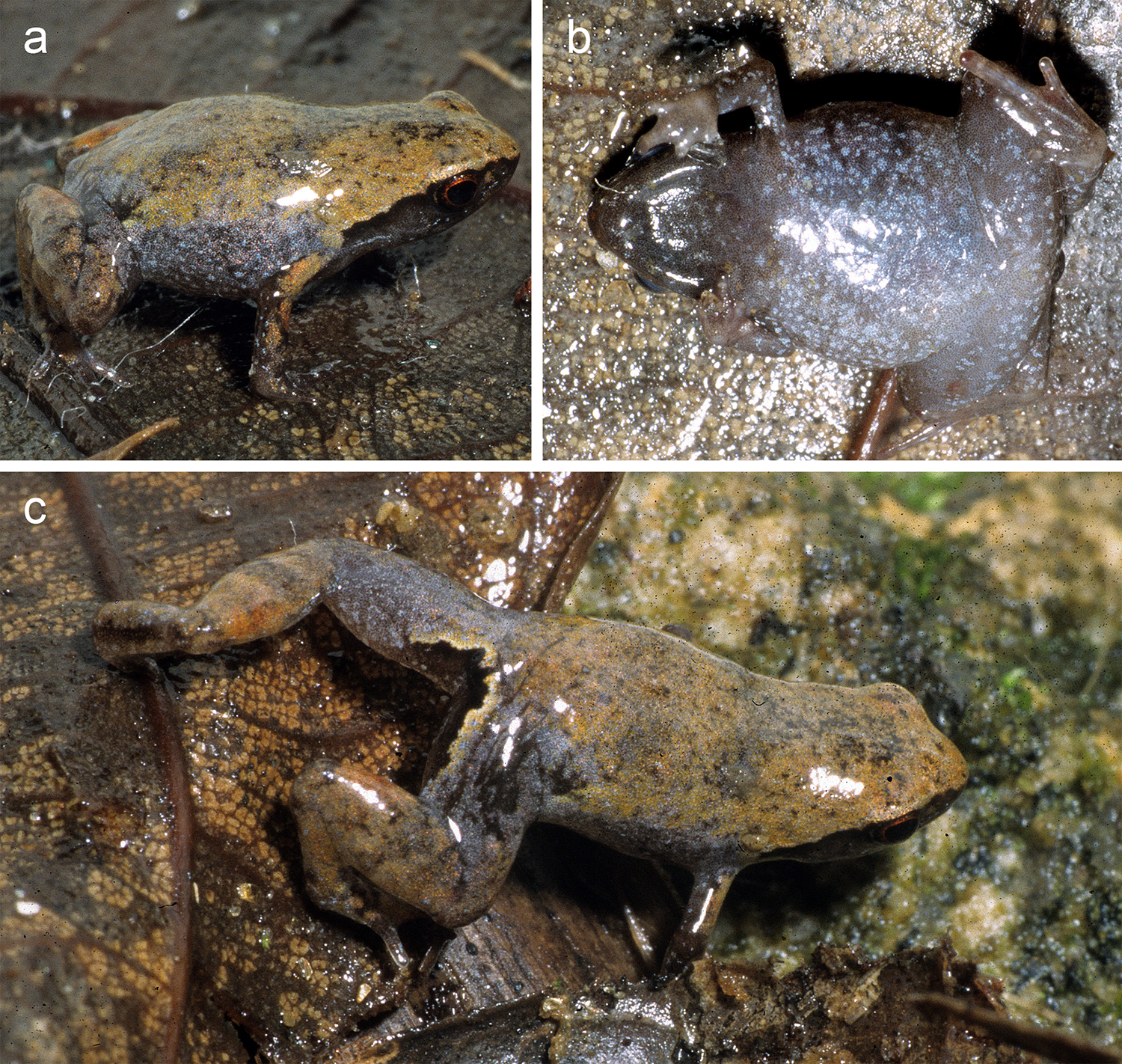
- Anodonthyla eximia from Ranomafana National Park

Conservation status
- Critically Endangered (IUCN 3.1)

Scientific classification
- Kingdom: Animalia
- Phylum: Chordata
- Class: Amphibia
- Order: Anura
- Family: Microhylidae
- Subfamily: Cophylinae
- Genus: Anodonthyla
- Species: A. eximia

Binomial name
- Anodonthyla eximia Scherz et al., 2019

= Anodonthyla eximia =

Species of frog

Anodonthyla eximia is a species of frog from Ranomafana in Eastern Madagascar endemic microhylid subfamily Cophylinae. It is the smallest species of the genus Anodonthyla and is the only known terrestrial member of the genus. It was the 8000th amphibian species added to Amphibian Species of the World.

== Range and distribution ==
Anodonthyla eximia is only known from Maharira mountain in Ranomafana National Park, South Central East Madagascar.

== Description ==
Anodonthyla eximia measures just 11.3 mm in adult females and 9.7 mm in adult males. Anodonthyla eximia lives on the ground in the leaf litter. It superficially closely resembles other diminutive frogs from Madagascar, such as Mini and Stumpffia, but males still have a strongly developed, pointed prepollex bone that is typical of Anodonthyla.

== Habitat and ecology ==
Like most other miniaturised frogs from Madagascar, Anodonthyla eximia is terrestrial. According to the original description, the only known specimen was collected after cyclonic rains. Males emit high-pitched whistling calls from the leaf litter.
