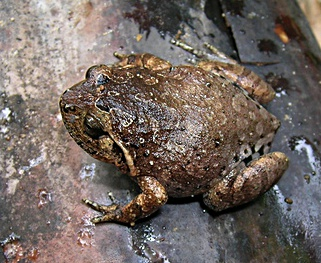

Conservation status
- Least Concern (IUCN 3.1)

Scientific classification
- Kingdom: Animalia
- Phylum: Chordata
- Class: Amphibia
- Order: Anura
- Family: Microhylidae
- Subfamily: Cophylinae
- Genus: Plethodontohyla
- Species: P. alluaudi

Binomial name
- Plethodontohyla alluaudi (Mocquard, 1901)

Synonyms
- Dyscophus alluaudi Mocquard, 1901; Mantipus alluaudi (Mocquard, 1901); Plethodontohyla laevis tsianovoihensis Angel, 1936; Plethodontohyla tsianovohensis Angel, 1936; Rhombophryne alluaudi (Mocquard, 1901)

= Plethodontohyla alluaudi =

Species of amphibian

Plethodontohyla alluaudi is a frog belonging to the Madagascar-endemic subfamily Cophylinae of the family Microhylidae. It is endemic to southeastern Madagascar. It is a terrestrial and fossorial frog that occurs in rainforest, including littoral forest. Despite being locally abundant, it is a difficult frog to find.

== Taxonomy ==
The species was originally described under the name Dyscophus alluaudi by Mocquard in 1901, originally described from the locality 'Fort Dauphin'—probably meaning the general area around Tôlanaro rather than the city itself. It was transferred to the genus Plethodontohyla in 1926, where it remained until Guibé transferred it to Mantipus in 1974, but he returned it to Plethodontohyla in 1978. The taxon Plethodontohyla laevis from further north on the east coast of Madagascar was synonymised with the species P. alluaudi in 1991. Blommers-Schlösser assigned a specimen from Mandraka in eastern Madagascar to this species, and subsequent authors interpreted specimens from the area around Andasibe as belonging to this species as well. Genetic sequences from specimens collected in this area were later used as the reference material for the species (summarised in ref.), and when it was found that the sequences of specimens of these species were more similar to sequences of the species Rhombophryne testudo than to other Plethodontohyla species, it was moved to the genus Rhombophryne, along with a slew of other species.

In 2017 Bellati et al. conducted a thorough review of the taxonomy of this species and its associated synonyms, based on osteology, external morphology, and phylogenetics. They showed (1) that the holotype is a Plethodontohyla species based on its osteology, (2) the holotype does not agree in morphology with the specimens used as genetic reference material for the species, and these are clearly Rhombophryne species based on their osteology, meaning that the species included in molecular phylogenetic reconstructions as P. alluaudi until that point represent an undescribed Rhombophryne species, (3) Plethodontohyla laevis is not synonymous with P. alluaudi, but is probably its sister species (with one candidate species that needs to be clarified falling between these two taxa in their phylogeny), and (4) a further synonym, P. laevis tsianovohensis, probably is synonymous with P. alluaudi. As a result, the authors of that study recommended that the species be reinstated in the genus Plethodontohyla, and P. laevis should be recognised as a valid species.
