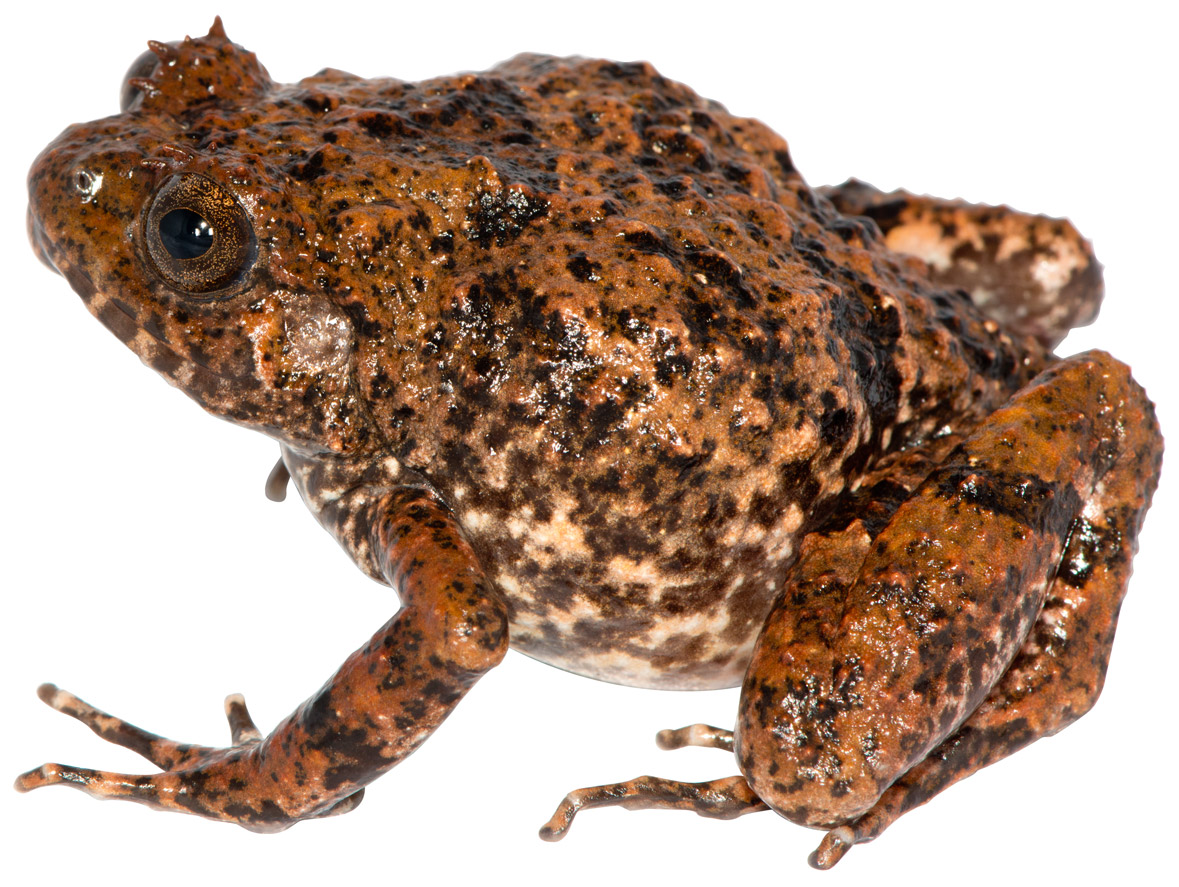

Conservation status
- Endangered (IUCN 3.1)

Scientific classification
- Kingdom: Animalia
- Phylum: Chordata
- Class: Amphibia
- Order: Anura
- Family: Microhylidae
- Subfamily: Cophylinae
- Genus: Rhombophryne
- Species: R. vaventy

Binomial name
- Rhombophryne vaventy Scherz, Ruthensteiner, Vences & Glaw, 2014

= Rhombophryne vaventy =

Species of amphibian

Rhombophryne vaventy is a large species of frogs of the Madagascar endemic microhylid subfamily Cophylinae. It is one of the largest members of its genus.

== Range and distribution ==
Rhombophryne vaventy is endemic to the Marojejy massif in northern Madagascar, where it was originally described from two individuals, captured at high altitude.

== Description ==
Rhombophryne vaventy measure up to 52 mm (2.0 in). In life, the dorsal skin is highly textured. It lacks webbing between the fingers and toes, and has very long legs. It possesses four unequally sized spines above each eye, characteristic of its species group.

== Habitat and ecology ==
Rhombophryne vaventy is found in montane rainforest at high altitude (~1,300 m (4,300 ft) above sea level) on the Marojejy massif. Like most Rhombophryne species, R. vaventy is a terrestrial or possibly semi-fossorial frog. It is a generalist predator, and its diet is known to include relatively large arthrosphaerid pill millipedes of the genus Zoosphaerium. Nothing is currently known of its breeding or calling behaviour.

A rotational gif of the skeleton of the holotype of Rhombophryne vaventy, with a Zoosphaerium sp. in its gut.

== Taxonomy ==
Rhombophryne vaventy was confused with R. serratopalpebrosa until the taxonomy of the R. serratopalpebrosa species complex began to be resolved. It differs from R. serratopalpebrosa in its size, eye spines, skin texture, and numerous other characters. Ongoing resolution of this complex has yielded several new species, including R. ornata and R. tany.
