= Anodonthyla hutchisoni =

Conservation status
- Endangered (IUCN 3.1)

Scientific classification
- Kingdom: Animalia
- Phylum: Chordata
- Class: Amphibia
- Order: Anura
- Family: Microhylidae
- Subfamily: Cophylinae
- Genus: Anodonthyla
- Species: A. hutchisoni

Binomial name
- Anodonthyla hutchisoni Fenolio, Walvoord, Stout, Randrianirina & Andreone, 2007

Species of amphibian

Anodonthyla hutchisoni is a species of microhylidae frog. This species is native to Madagascar and can be found in lowland rain forests.
