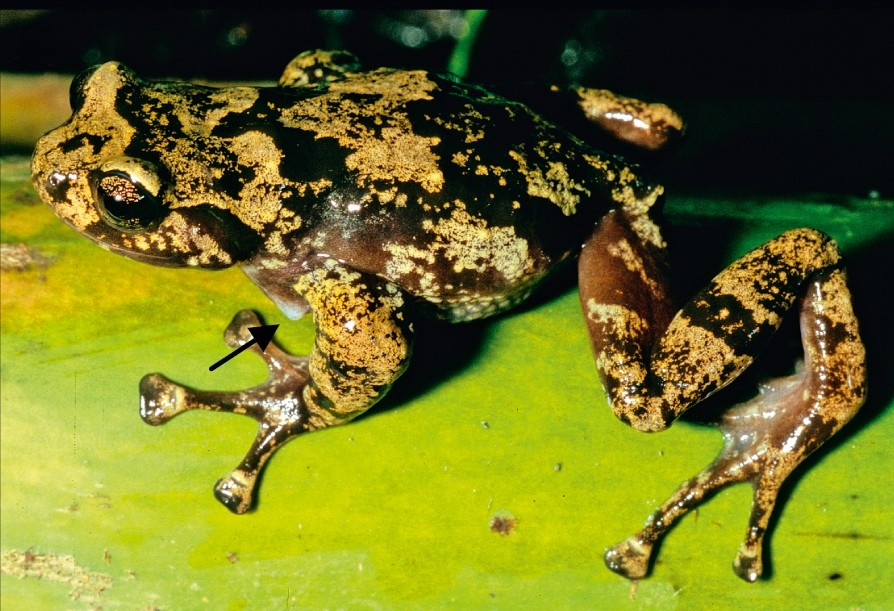
- Anodonthyla rouxae

Conservation status
- Endangered (IUCN 3.1)

Scientific classification
- Kingdom: Animalia
- Phylum: Chordata
- Class: Amphibia
- Order: Anura
- Family: Microhylidae
- Subfamily: Cophylinae
- Genus: Anodonthyla
- Species: A. rouxae

Binomial name
- Anodonthyla rouxae Guibé, 1974

= Anodonthyla rouxae =

Species of amphibian

Anodonthyla rouxae is a species of frogs in the family Microhylidae. It is endemic to Madagascar. Its natural habitat is subtropical or tropical moist montane forests. It is threatened by habitat loss.

== Etymology ==
The specific name, rouxae (genitive, feminine, singular), is in honor of French herpetologist Mme. Rolande Roux-Estève.
