= Plethodontohyla tuberata =

Conservation status
- Near Threatened (IUCN 3.1)

Scientific classification
- Kingdom: Animalia
- Phylum: Chordata
- Class: Amphibia
- Order: Anura
- Family: Microhylidae
- Subfamily: Cophylinae
- Genus: Plethodontohyla
- Species: P. tuberata

Binomial name
- Plethodontohyla tuberata (Peters, 1883)

Species of frog

Plethodontohyla tuberata is a species of frog in the family Microhylidae. It is endemic to Madagascar. Its natural habitats are subtropical or tropical moist montane forests, subtropical or tropical high-altitude shrubland, subtropical or tropical high-altitude grassland, arable land, plantations, rural gardens, and heavily degraded former forest. It is threatened by habitat loss.
