= Plethodontohyla ocellata =

Conservation status
- Least Concern (IUCN 3.1)

Scientific classification
- Kingdom: Animalia
- Phylum: Chordata
- Class: Amphibia
- Order: Anura
- Family: Microhylidae
- Subfamily: Cophylinae
- Genus: Plethodontohyla
- Species: P. ocellata

Binomial name
- Plethodontohyla ocellata Noble & Parker, 1926

Species of frog

Plethodontohyla ocellata is a species of frog in the family Microhylidae. It is endemic to Madagascar. Its natural habitat is subtropical or tropical moist lowland forests. It is threatened by habitat loss.
