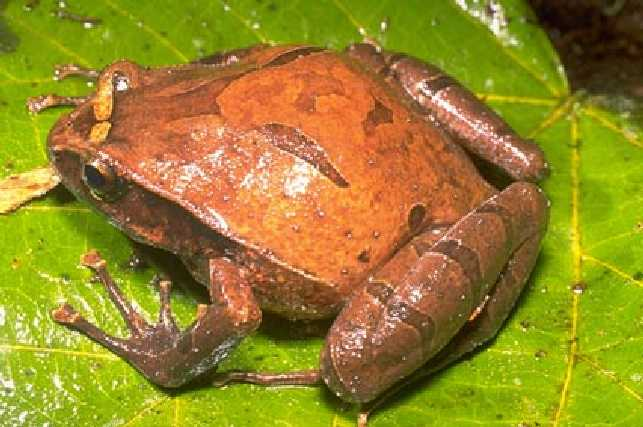

Conservation status
- Least Concern (IUCN 3.1)

Scientific classification
- Kingdom: Animalia
- Phylum: Chordata
- Class: Amphibia
- Order: Anura
- Family: Microhylidae
- Subfamily: Cophylinae
- Genus: Plethodontohyla
- Species: P. inguinalis

Binomial name
- Plethodontohyla inguinalis Boulenger, 1882

= Plethodontohyla inguinalis =

Species of frog

Plethodontohyla inguinalis is a species of frog in the family Microhylidae. It is endemic to Madagascar. Its natural habitats are subtropical or tropical moist lowland forests and subtropical or tropical moist montane forests. It is threatened by habitat loss.
