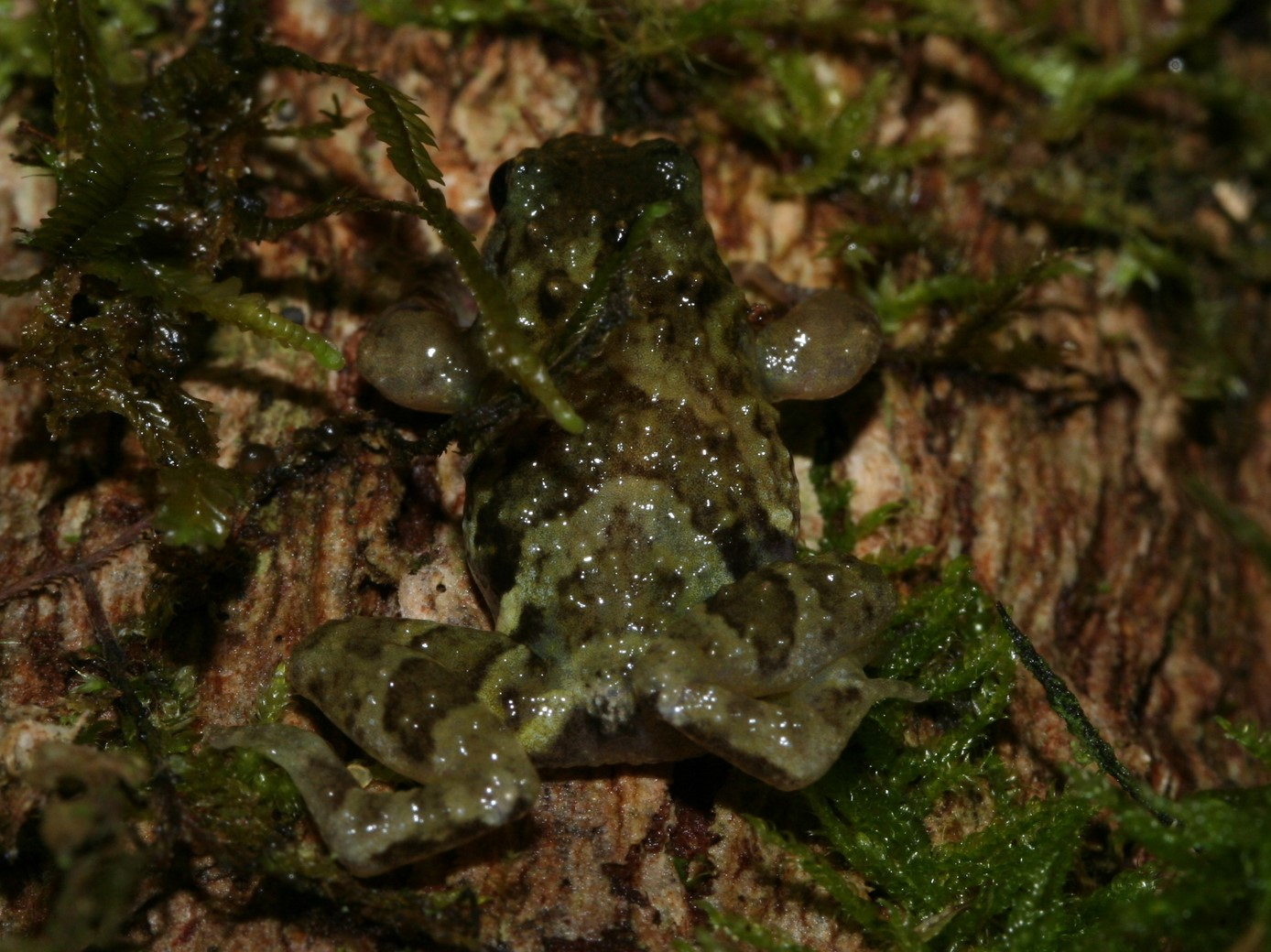

Conservation status
- Endangered (IUCN 3.1)

Scientific classification
- Kingdom: Animalia
- Phylum: Chordata
- Class: Amphibia
- Order: Anura
- Family: Microhylidae
- Subfamily: Cophylinae
- Genus: Anodonthyla
- Species: A. moramora

Binomial name
- Anodonthyla moramora Glaw and Vences, 2005

= Anodonthyla moramora =

Species of amphibian

Anodonthyla moramora is a species of microhylidae frog. This species is native to Madagascar.
