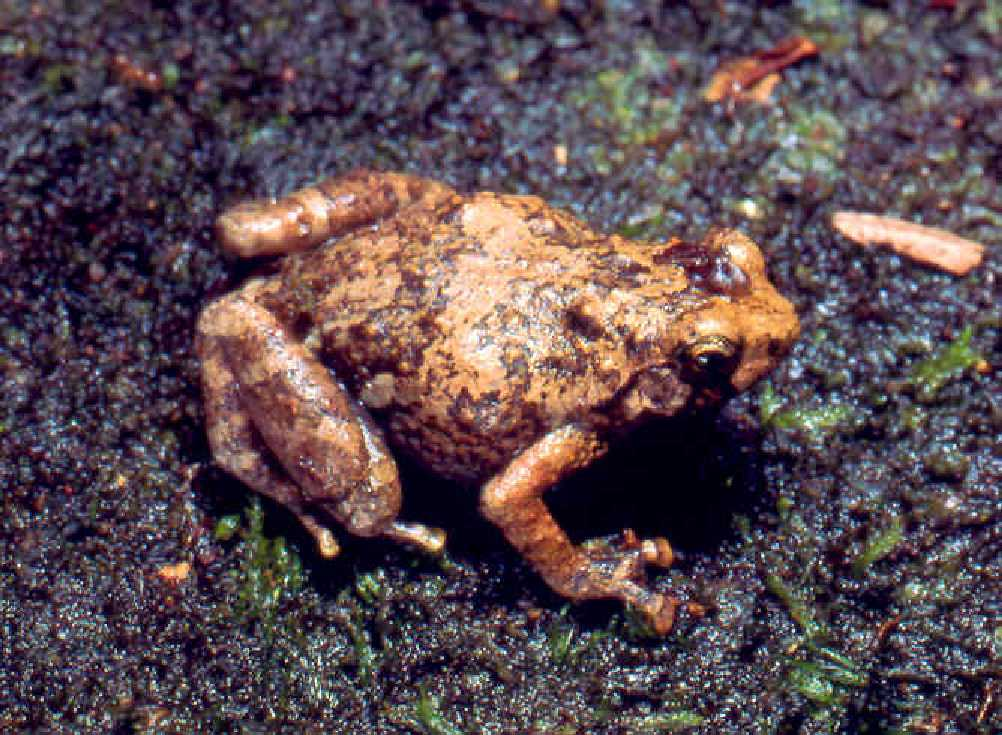

Conservation status
- Endangered (IUCN 3.1)

Scientific classification
- Kingdom: Animalia
- Phylum: Chordata
- Class: Amphibia
- Order: Anura
- Family: Microhylidae
- Subfamily: Cophylinae
- Genus: Anodonthyla
- Species: A. nigrigularis

Binomial name
- Anodonthyla nigrigularis Glaw & Vences, 1992

= Anodonthyla nigrigularis =

Species of frog

Anodonthyla nigrigularis also known as the Black-throated Climbing frog is a species of frog in the family Microhylidae. It is endemic to Madagascar. Its natural habitats are subtropical or tropical moist lowland forests, subtropical or tropical moist montane forests, and heavily degraded former forest. It is threatened by habitat loss from agriculture, timber extraction, charcoal manufacturing, spread of non-native eucalyptus, livestock grazing and human settlement. The exact population is unknown but it is seemingly abundant in well-managed Andohahela National Park and less common in Ambohitantely Reserve which is not well managed. Not much else is known about the species.
