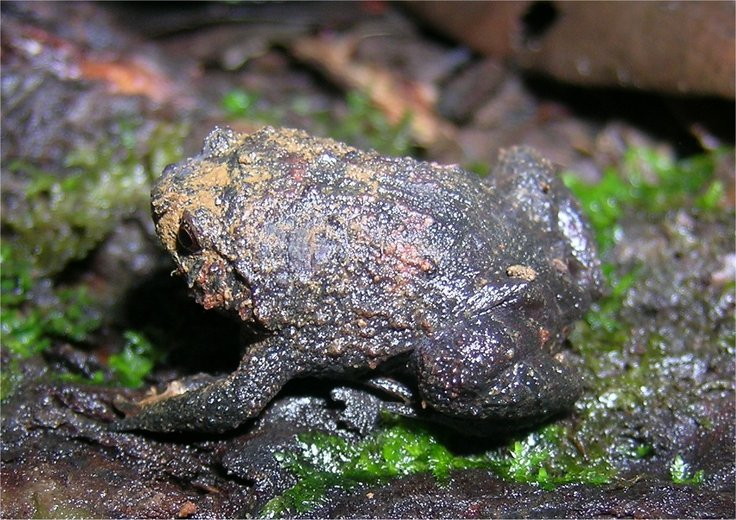
- Rhombophryne coudreaui

Scientific classification
- Kingdom: Animalia
- Phylum: Chordata
- Class: Amphibia
- Order: Anura
- Family: Microhylidae
- Subfamily: Cophylinae
- Genus: Rhombophryne; Boettger, 1880

Type species
- Rhombophryne testudo Boettger, 1880

Diversity
- 20 species

= Rhombophryne =

Genus of amphibians

Rhombophryne is a genus of microhylid frogs endemic to Madagascar. It is currently estimated to include more than 23 species, but only 20 of these are currently described. The common name 'diamond frog' has been proposed and used for members of this genus.

== Taxonomy ==
The genus Rhombophryne was monotypic until 2005, containing just R. testudo Boettger, 1880. However, in 2005 Andreone et al. showed that the genus Plethodontohyla was paraphyletic with respect to this genus. Several species were therefore transferred to this genus by Frost et al. in 2006, Glaw and Vences in 2007, and Wollenberg et al. in 2008. In 2015/2016, Peloso et al. re-analysed the genetic relationships of the Microhylidae using partial genomic data. They proposed the synonymy of Stumpffia with Rhombophryne because these genera were found to be paraphyletic. However, in 2016 Scherz et al. re-analysed their data with new data—including osteology and external morphology. They found strong support for these groups being ecologically distinct, non-synonymous sister taxa. To accommodate this, however, they established a new genus, Anilany for a species that would otherwise have rendered Stumpffia paraphyletic. These findings were supported by a subsequent study on the phylogeny of the family Microhylidae.

At present at least one species group is recognised: the Rhombophryne serratopalpebrosa species group, containing R. serratopalpebrosa, R. guentherpetersi, R. coronata, R. vaventy, R. tany, R. ornata, R. regalis, and R. diadema. This group is recognised due to the clearly synapomorphic superciliary spines (spines above the eyes) shared by all of its members, in addition to its consistent monophyly in various phylogenetic reconstructions. Other species groups have yet to be established.

In early 2018, Bellati et al. moved the species Rhombophryne alluaudi to Plethodontohyla based on examination of the type material; specimens in phylogenetic analyses that had been referred to as R. alluaudi in fact belong to an undescribed species of Rhombophryne.

== Ecomorphology ==
Members of the genus Rhombophryne are ecologically and morphologically diverse. The type species, R. testudo shows many specialisations to burrowing, such as a short head, short limbs, and large metatarsal tubercles, as do its two closest relatives, R. matavy and R. coudreaui. Most other species have a stout body shape which may suggest partially burrowing habits as well. Rhombophryne minuta and R. longicrus by contrast have unusually long limbs, and it has been argued that they probably are more terrestrial and saltatorial than the other members of the genus. Rhombophryne proportinalis is a miniaturised species, attaining an adult body size of 11–12 mm. It was argued to be a proportional dwarf in its original description, based on its non-paedomorphic proportions compared to similarly sized Cophylinae frogs.

== Reproductive Ecology ==
The mating habits of most species of Rhombophryne are not known. It is likely that all members of this genus engage in parental care, which is common to most members of the Cophylinae. Two adult R. testudo individuals were found together with 18 putative offspring in a burrow by a stream at the edge of Lokobe Reserve on Nosy Be, at the end of the dry season. This is the only direct evidence of reproductive behaviour in this genus. So far, the advertisement calls of eight species have been published: R. botabota, R. minuta, R. mangabensis, R. matavy, R. testudo, R. nilevina, R. coronata, and R. proportionalis. Most of their calls are honking sounds emitted after quite long intervals, but R. minuta emits paired notes, and R. proportionalis emits series of 9–17 notes.

== Species ==
- Rhombophryne anatiala (2026)
- Rhombophryne botabota Scherz, Glaw, Vences, Andreone & Crottini, 2016
- Rhombophryne coronata (Vences and Glaw, 2003)
- Rhombophryne coudreaui (Angel, 1938)
- Rhombophryne diadema Scherz, Hawlitschek, Andreone, Rakotoarison, Vences & Glaw, 2017
- Rhombophryne guentherpetersi (Guibé, 1974)
- Rhombophryne kilonjy (2026)
- Rhombophryne kotrobaratra (2026)
- Rhombophryne laevipes (Mocquard, 1895)
- Rhombophryne longicrus Scherz, Rakotoarison, Hawlitschek, Vences & Glaw, 2015
- Rhombophryne mangabensis Glaw, Köhler & Vences, 2010
- Rhombophryne maraorao (2026)
- Rhombophryne matavy D'Cruze, Köhler, Vences & Glaw, 2010
- Rhombophryne mavokely (2026)
- Rhombophryne minuta (Guibé, 1975)
- Rhombophryne nilevina Lambert, Hutter & Scherz, 2017
- Rhombophryne ornata Scherz, Ruthensteiner, Vieites, Vences & Glaw, 2015
- Rhombophryne proportinalis Scherz, Hutter, Rakotoarison, Riemann, Rödel, Ndriantsoa, Glos, Roberts, Crottini, Vences & Glaw, 2019
- Rhombophryne quentini (2026)
- Rhombophryne regalis Scherz, Hawlitschek, Andreone, Rakotoarison, Vences & Glaw, 2017
- Rhombophryne savaka Scherz, Glaw, Vences, Andreone & Crottini, 2016
- Rhombophryne serratopalpebrosa (Guibé, 1975)
- Rhombophryne sonaliae (2026)
- Rhombophryne tany Scherz, Ruthensteiner, Vieites, Vences & Glaw, 2015
- Rhombophryne testudo Boettger, 1880
- Rhombophryne vaventy Scherz, Ruthensteiner, Vences & Glaw, 2014
- Rhombophryne ellae Scherz, 2020
