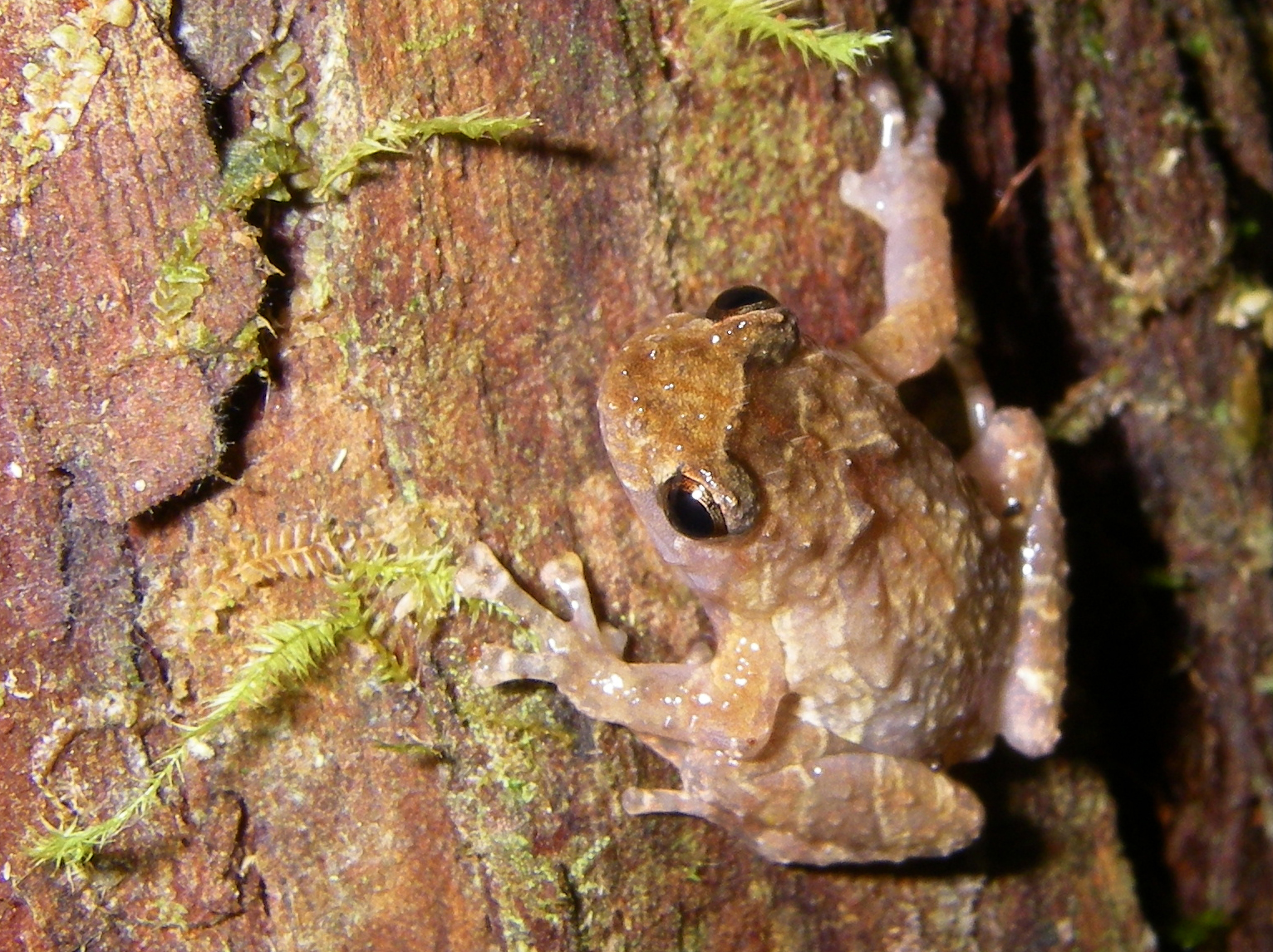
- Anodonthyla boulengerii

Scientific classification
- Kingdom: Animalia
- Phylum: Chordata
- Class: Amphibia
- Order: Anura
- Family: Microhylidae
- Subfamily: Cophylinae
- Genus: Anodonthyla; Müller, 1892

Type species
- Anodonthyla boulengerii Müller, 1892

Species
- 12 species (see text)

= Anodonthyla =

Genus of amphibians

Anodonthyla is a genus of microhylid frogs endemic to Madagascar. Molecular data suggest that it is the sister taxon to all other species in the subfamily Cophylinae.

== Species ==
The genus contains twelve recognized species:

Binomial Name and Author	Common Name
Anodonthyla boulengerii Müller, 1892	Boulenger's climbing frog
Anodonthyla emilei Vences, Glaw, Köhler, and Wollenberg, 2010
Anodonthyla eximia Scherz, Hutter, Rakotoarison, Riemann, Rödel, Ndriantsoa, Glos, Roberts, Crottini, Vences, and Glaw, 2019
Anodonthyla hutchisoni Fenolio, Walvoord, Stout, Randrianirina, & Andreone, 2007
Anodonthyla jeanbai Vences, Glaw, Köhler, and Wollenberg, 2010
Anodonthyla montana Angel, 1925	Mountain climbing frog
Anodonthyla moramora Glaw & Vences, 2005
Anodonthyla nigrigularis Glaw & Vences, 1992	Black-throated climbing frog
Anodonthyla pollicaris (Boettger, 1913)
Anodonthyla rouxae Guibé, 1974	Madagascar climbing frog
Anodonthyla theoi Vences, Glaw, Köhler, and Wollenberg, 2010
Anodonthyla vallani Vences, Glaw, Köhler, and Wollenberg, 2010

== Description ==
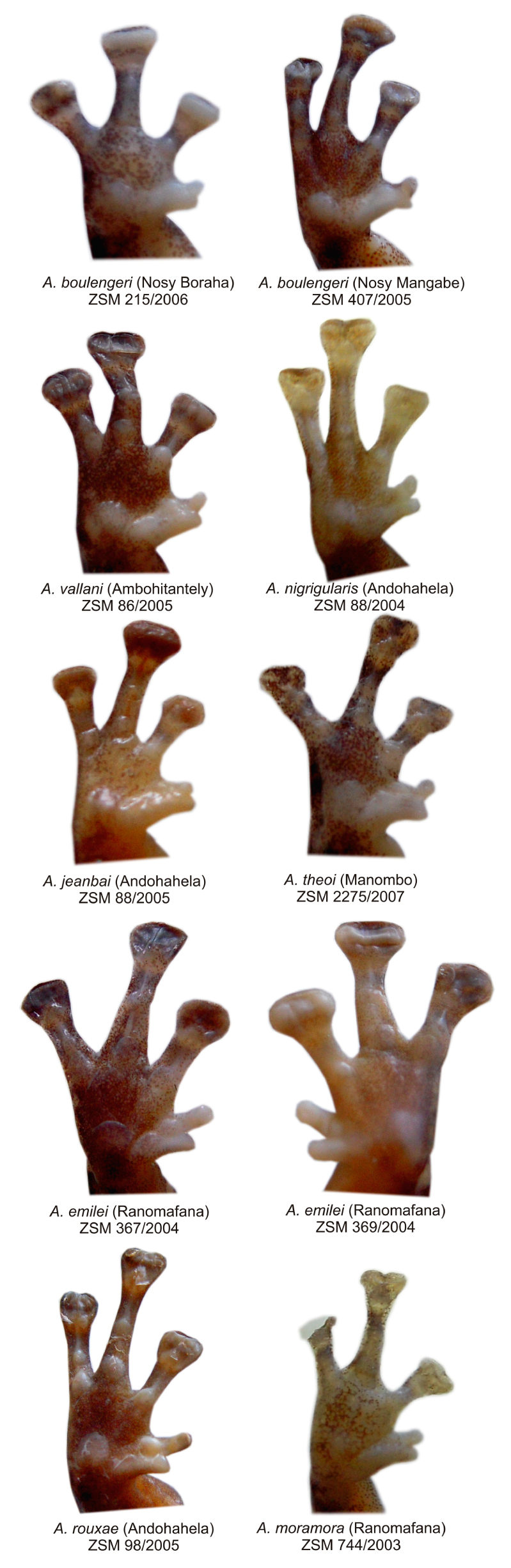
Views of palmar surfaces of males of various Anodonthyla species, showing relative size and degree of separation of first finger and prepollex.

One of the most obvious morphological synapomorphies of the genus is the presence, in males only, of a large prepollex that runs along the first finger and generally is closely connected to the first finger over most of its length. Correlated to this character, in males and females, the first finger is very short compared to other cophylines. This is true even of the extremely miniaturised species Anodonthyla eximia described in 2019.

== Related pages ==
- Amphibians of Madagascar
