= Rhombophryne minuta =

Conservation status
- Endangered (IUCN 3.1)

Scientific classification
- Kingdom: Animalia
- Phylum: Chordata
- Class: Amphibia
- Order: Anura
- Family: Microhylidae
- Subfamily: Cophylinae
- Genus: Rhombophryne
- Species: R. minuta

Binomial name
- Rhombophryne minuta (Guibé, 1975)
- Range as understood in 2009. At present, the species is known with certainty only from the Marojejy National Park.

Synonyms
- Mantipus minutus Guibé, 1975; Plethodontohyla minuta (Guibé, 1975)

Species of frog

Rhombophryne minuta is a species of frog in the family Microhylidae. It is endemic to northern Madagascar. It has been mixed with other species such as Rhombophryne mangabensis; it is known with certainty only from the Marojejy National Park.

== Description ==
As the specific name minuta suggests, Rhombophryne minuta is a small species: adult males are about 16–17 mm (0.63–0.67 in) and females about 22 mm (0.87 in) in snout–vent length. The tympanum is indistinct. The dorsal skin is smooth to slightly granular. Colouration is quite variable; the dorsum is uniformly brown or with dark reticulations and yellowish spots. Flanks often bear small white dots. A largely yellowish specimen with a broad yellowish median stripe bordered by a dark line is also known. The venter has distinct or indistinct dark reticulations.

== Habitat and conservation ==
Rhombophryne minuta occur in lowland and montane rainforest, at elevations of about 1,570 m (5,150 ft) above sea level. It is a fossorial and terrestrial species. Its forest habitat is threatened by subsistence agriculture, timber extraction, charcoal manufacture, spread of invasive species (eucalyptus), livestock grazing, and expanding human settlements. Illegal timber extraction has also occurred in the Marojejy National Park.
