= Rhombophryne laevipes =

Conservation status
- Least Concern (IUCN 3.1)

Scientific classification
- Domain: Eukaryota
- Kingdom: Animalia
- Phylum: Chordata
- Class: Amphibia
- Order: Anura
- Family: Microhylidae
- Subfamily: Cophylinae
- Genus: Rhombophryne
- Species: R. laevipes

Binomial name
- Rhombophryne laevipes (Mocquard, 1895)

Synonyms
- Mantiphrys laevipes Mocquard, 1895; Plethodontohyla laevipes (Mocquard, 1895)

Species of amphibian

Rhombophryne laevipes is a frog of the family Microhylidae. It is endemic to Madagascar and known from localities in northern, eastern, southeastern, and mid-western parts of the island. It might be a species complex, with the "true" R. laevipes restricted to northern Madagascar.

Rhombophryne laevipes occurs in rainforests, including degraded ones. It is a burrowing species. Although rare, it is widespread and tolerates some habitat modification, hence the International Union for Conservation of Nature (IUCN) does not consider it threatened.
