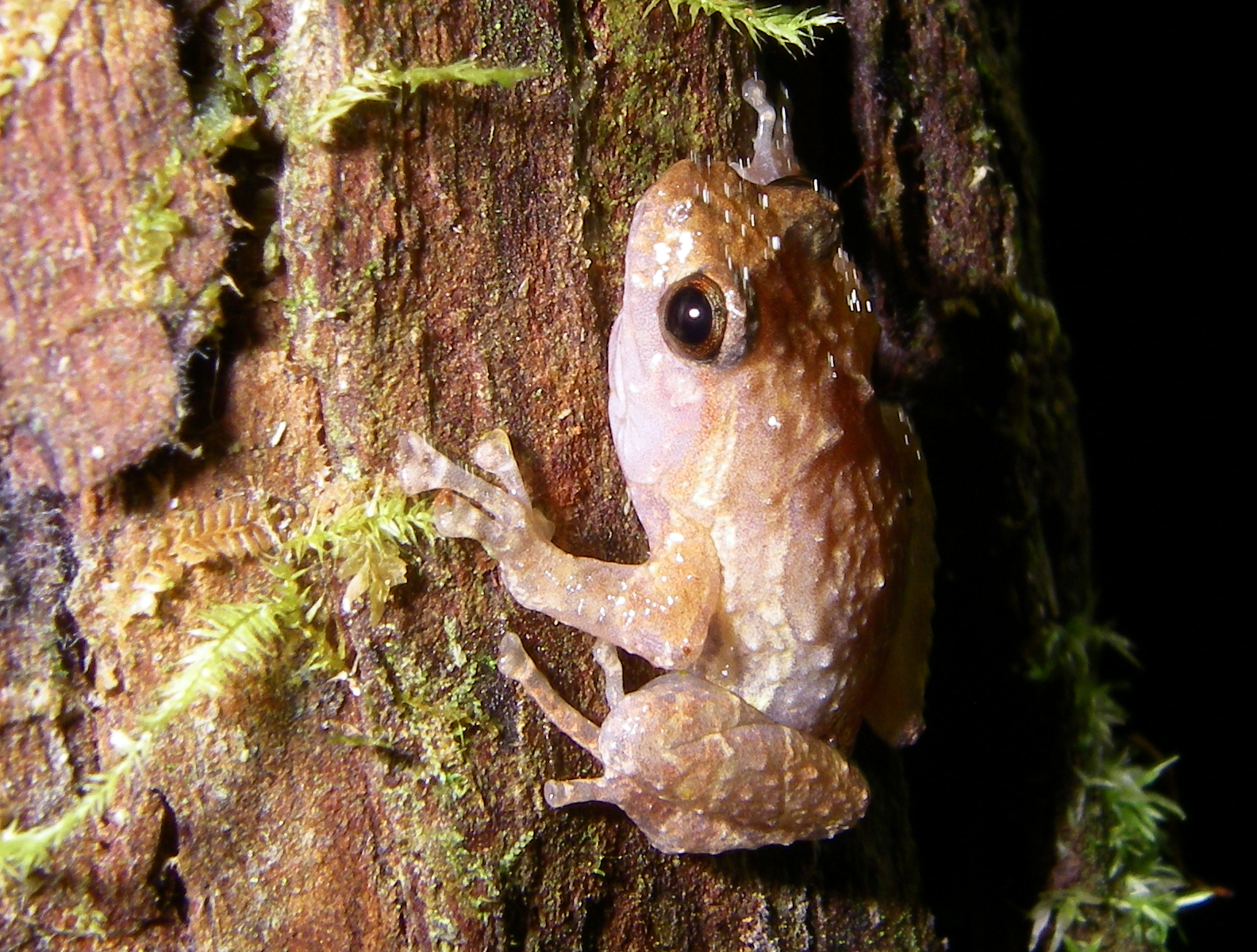

Conservation status
- Near Threatened (IUCN 3.1)

Scientific classification
- Kingdom: Animalia
- Phylum: Chordata
- Class: Amphibia
- Order: Anura
- Family: Microhylidae
- Subfamily: Cophylinae
- Genus: Anodonthyla
- Species: A. boulengerii

Binomial name
- Anodonthyla boulengerii Müller, 1892

= Anodonthyla boulengerii =

Species of amphibian

Anodonthyla boulengerii (commonly known as Boulenger's climbing frog) is a species of frog in the family Microhylidae. It is endemic to Madagascar. Its natural habitats are subtropical or tropical moist lowland forests, subtropical or tropical moist montane forests, and heavily degraded former forest. It is threatened by habitat loss.
