= Rhombophryne guentherpetersi =

Conservation status
- Endangered (IUCN 3.1)

Scientific classification
- Domain: Eukaryota
- Kingdom: Animalia
- Phylum: Chordata
- Class: Amphibia
- Order: Anura
- Family: Microhylidae
- Subfamily: Cophylinae
- Genus: Rhombophryne
- Species: R. guentherpetersi

Binomial name
- Rhombophryne guentherpetersi (Guibé, 1974)

Synonyms
- Mantipus guentherpetersi Guibé, 1974; Plethodontohyla guentherpetersi (Guibé, 1974)

Species of amphibian

Rhombophryne guentherpetersi is a frog of the family Microhylidae. It is endemic to northern Madagascar and known from the Tsaratanana Massif. It inhabits high-elevation forest and, perhaps, montane grassland, at elevations of 2,000–2,600 m (6,600–8,500 ft) above sea level. It is a rare species that suffers from habitat loss and degradation. It occurs in the Tsaratanana Reserve but the reserve borders are ambiguous, complicating management of the area.
