= Rhombophryne coronata =

Conservation status
- Least Concern (IUCN 3.1)

Scientific classification
- Kingdom: Animalia
- Phylum: Chordata
- Class: Amphibia
- Order: Anura
- Family: Microhylidae
- Subfamily: Cophylinae
- Genus: Rhombophryne
- Species: R. coronata

Binomial name
- Rhombophryne coronata (Vences and Glaw, 2003)

Synonyms
- Plethodontohyla coronata Vences and Glaw, 2003

Species of amphibian

Rhombophryne coronata is a frog of the family Microhylidae. It is endemic to eastern Madagascar.

Rhombophryne coronata is a terrestrial and fossorial species that inhabits primary and somewhat degraded rainforests as well as pine plantations. It is particularly associated with forests rich in moss and lichens. It is a widespread species that is moderately common in parts of its range. It is facing habitat loss caused by subsistence agriculture, timber extraction, charcoal production, invasive species (eucalyptus), and expanding human settlements. It occurs in the Zahamena, Andasibe-Mantadia, and Andringitra National Parks.
