= Rhombophryne testudo =

Conservation status
- Endangered (IUCN 3.1)

Scientific classification
- Kingdom: Animalia
- Phylum: Chordata
- Class: Amphibia
- Order: Anura
- Family: Microhylidae
- Subfamily: Cophylinae
- Genus: Rhombophryne
- Species: R. testudo

Binomial name
- Rhombophryne testudo Boettger, 1880

Species of frog

Rhombophryne testudo is a species of frog in the family Microhylidae. It is endemic to Madagascar.

Its natural habitats are subtropical or tropical moist lowland forests, plantations, and heavily degraded former forest. It is threatened by habitat loss.
