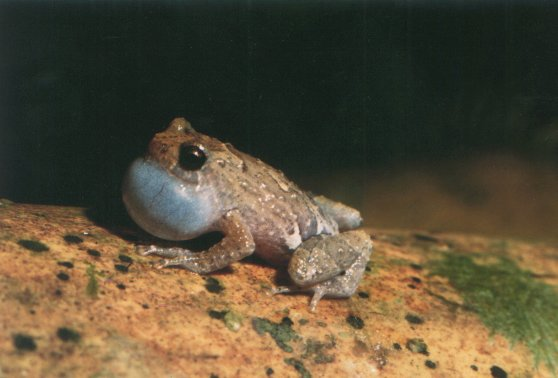
- Anodonthyla boulengerii

Scientific classification
- Kingdom: Animalia
- Phylum: Chordata
- Class: Amphibia
- Order: Anura
- Family: Microhylidae
- Subfamily: Cophylinae; Cope, 1889

Type genus
- Cophyla Boettger, 1880

Genera
- See text

= Cophylinae =

Subfamily of amphibians

Cophylinae is a subfamily of microhylid frogs endemic to Madagascar. It has over 100 species in eight genera. Members of this subfamily range from minute (< 10 mm adult body size) to fairly large (> 100 mm adult body size), and they are highly ecologically diverse. DNA barcode research has revealed a significant taxonomic gap in this subfamily, and an estimated 70+ candidate species were identified. Many of these have subsequently been described, as well as numerous new discoveries (e.g. 26 species of Stumpffia described in 2017).

== Genera ==
As of December 2019, the following genera are recognised in the subfamily Cophylinae:

- Anilany Scherz, Vences, Rakotoarison, Andreone, Köhler, Glaw & Crottini, 2016 (monotypic)
- Anodonthyla Müller, 1892 (12 species)
- Cophyla Boettger, 1880 (21 species)
- Madecassophryne Guibé, 1974 (monotypic)
- Mini Scherz, Hutter, Rakotoarison, Riemann, Rödel, Ndriantsoa, Glos, Roberts, Crottini, Vences & Glaw, 2019 (3 species)
- Plethodontohyla Boulenger, 1882 (11 species)
- Rhombophryne Boettger, 1880 (9 species)
- Stumpffia Boettger, 1881 (41 species)

== Biology ==
Cophylines are characterized by a derived mode of larval development: whereas most microhylids have a specialized filter-feeding tadpole, cophylines have non-feeding tadpoles that develop either in tree holes, terrestrial foam nests, or terrestrial jelly nests. Most cophylines have very simple advertisement calls, consisting of single melodious notes that are repeated after regular intervals and for long periods of time, usually lasting several minutes. Correlated to the reproductive mode of the various cophyline lineages is their arboreal versus terrestrial or fossorial ecology, and apparently, multiple evolutionary shifts between arboreal and terrestrial habits have occurred in this subfamily.

== Origins and evolution ==
There is little doubt that the Cophylinae originated on Madagascar, as they are restricted to the island. Their affinities with other subfamilies of the diverse Microhylidae have been a matter of some debate, and only recently has a tentative consensus emerged that they are most closely related to the Scaphiophryninae, another Madagascar-endemic subfamily. Thus, two subfamily units of Microhylidae are endemic to and probably originated on the island of Madagascar. What is also clear is that the third Madagascar-endemic subfamily, Dyscophinae, is not closely related to these two subfamilies, so microhylids colonised Madagascar at least twice. It is not however clear which subfamily is most closely related to Cophylinae+Scaphiophryninae, in part because the topology of deep nodes of the microhylid evolutionary tree is not satisfactorily resolved and remains unstable.

The subfamily Cophylinae has its centre of diversity in the rainforests of northern Madagascar, and today only few species are known from more arid areas in the drier west of the island. As its sister subfamily Scaphiophryninae also has most of its centre of diversity in this area, it is probable that these subfamilies originated in northern Madagascar and radiated thence outward across the island. It remains to be seen if the description of the 70+ undescribed candidate species of Cophylinae will influence this pattern once described and incorporated into spatial analyses.

The Cophylinae are highly ecologically labile over evolutionary time: in several instances, phylogenetic relationships based on DNA sequence data clearly indicate repeated transitions from e.g. terrestrial to arboreal habits and back. This has resulted in extensive homoplasy in ecologically-related morphological traits among the frogs, which led also to taxonomic confusion when only sparse morphological data were available; a problem that has been mostly but not fully rectified by the increased availability of DNA sequence data. Among the repeated ecomorphs that have evolved is miniaturised body size. In 2019, five new species of miniaturised frogs were described, including the genus Mini, and members of the genera Rhombophryne and Anodonthyla. The relationships of these frogs within the subfamily indicate that at least four different groups within this subfamily have independently evolved to be among the smallest frogs in the world.
