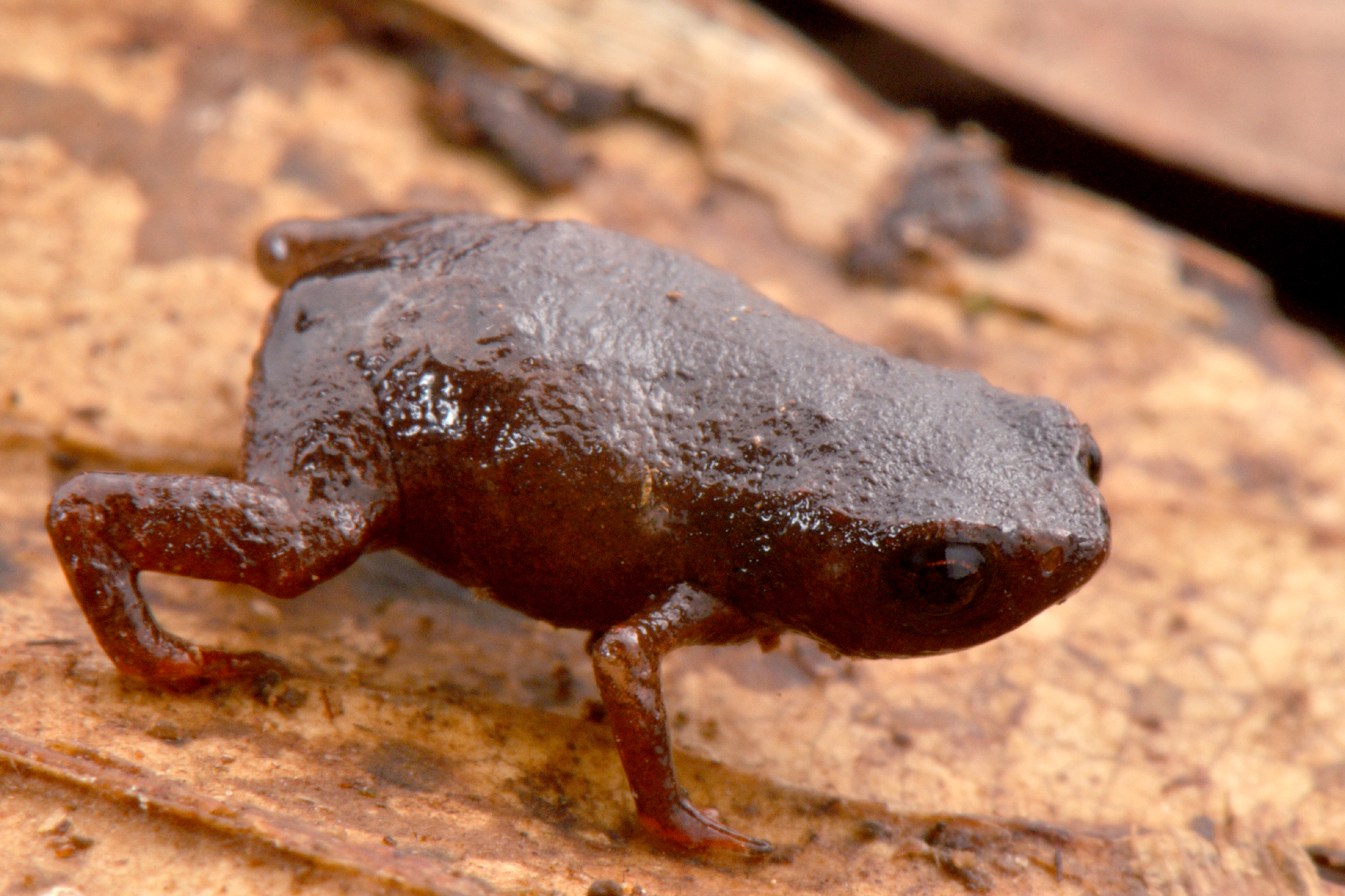

Scientific classification
- Kingdom: Animalia
- Phylum: Chordata
- Class: Amphibia
- Order: Anura
- Family: Brachycephalidae
- Genus: Brachycephalus
- Species: B. curupira

Binomial name
- Brachycephalus curupira Ribeiro, Blackburn, Stanley, Pie and Bornschein, 2017

= Brachycephalus curupira =

Species of amphibian

Brachycephalus curupira is a species of amphibian in the family Brachycephalidae, found in the city of São José dos Pinhais, Paraná, Brazil.

Their striking characteristics are their small size, a maximum of ten millimeters, and their habit of croaking during the day, something not commonly seen in amphibian species. They also have direct development, not passing through the aquatic larval stage.

It was described on July 27, 2017, in the scientific journal PeerJ, by a group of five researchers. Its name is a reference to the folkloric figure Curupira and the difficulty of locating individuals from their vocalization. It has not yet been categorized by the International Union for Conservation of Nature (IUCN), but the researchers classify it as a data deficient species.

== Taxonomy ==
The species was described on July 27, 2017, in the scientific journal PeerJ by researchers Luiz F. Ribeiro, David C. Blackburn, Edward L. Stanley, Marcio R. Pie, and Marcos R. Bornschein. It was discovered to belong to the genus Brachycephalus after diagnosis of the osteological tract, with a reduction in the phalanx bone, an arciferal shoulder girdle in which the ossified procoracoids and epicoracoidal cartilages are fused to the clavicle, coracoid and scapula, with an expanded suprascapula with a prominent cleithrum and absence of the sternum. It was further classified as belonging to the clade of Brachycephalus pernix, by having a bufoniform body and absence of osteoderms. To determine speciation, morphological examinations were done, detecting a number of unique features, and after the analyses on the 16S ribosomal RNA. The holotype was found in the district of Malhada, in São José dos Pinhais, Brazil, at an altitude of 1 120 meters, on November 15, 2012, consisting of an adult male. The other individuals were found in the same city, between 2012 and 2016, consisting of six males and three females.

The phylogenetically closest species is Brachycephalus izecksohni, but the most morphologically similar is B. brunneus, which is closer to B. leopardus.

Its scientific name is a reference to the Brazilian folkloric figure Curupira, who is the protector of the forests and has red hair and backwards-facing feet, and who becomes invisible and produces sounds to confuse those walking in his forests, alluding to the difficulty researchers have in finding the males from their vocalization.

== Distribution and conservation ==
The only place where the species is known is in the city of São José dos Pinhais and surroundings, inhabiting 3 types of biomes: cloud forest, montane forest and secondary forest. It has an estimated distribution of 2,211 hectares and is quite abundant, with up to one individual every 2 and 3 square meters in the most populated areas. Its distribution is strongly associated with the bamboo species Chusquea sp. Although it is abundant and has an active vocalization during the day, it is difficult to find, because it is mostly camouflaged in fallen leaves on the ground. In its area of occurrence, plantations, granite mines, residential areas and roads have been found, which, along with attitudes such as construction of transmission lines, logging and forest fires, can threaten the species and local biodiversity. However, the biggest threat is the cultivation of Pinus sp., which can increase the area of exposed rock in the forests, which prevents its recovery, and also decreases the quality of the soil and affects the microclimate of the region. Because of this and the lack of concrete information on its expansion, researchers consider it a data-deficient species. After the discovery of the species, 34 species are counted as belonging to the genus Brachycephalus and 1 045 amphibian species can be found in Brazil.

== Description and ecology ==
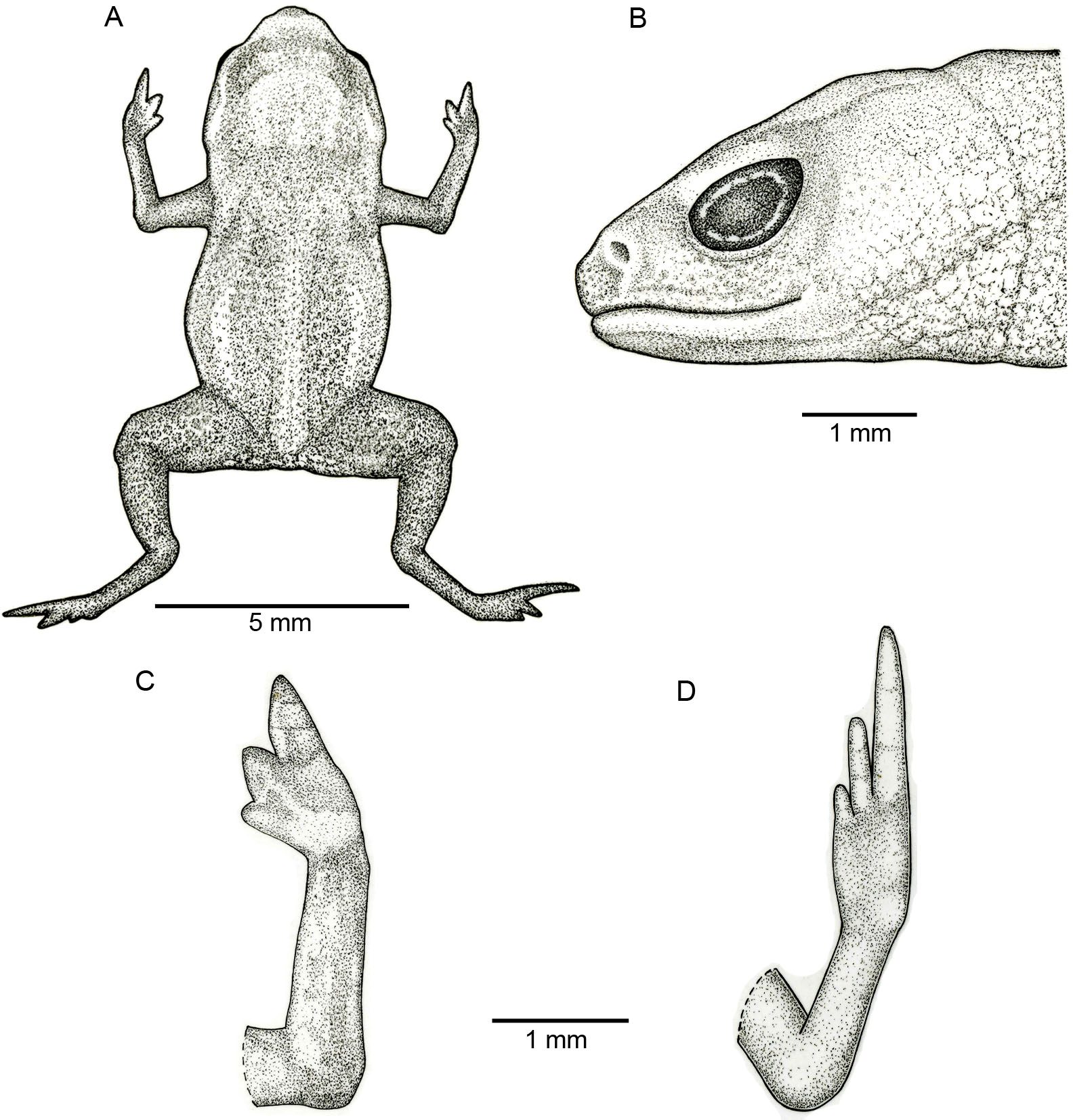
(A) Dorsal view of the body, (B) lateral view of the head, (C) ventral view of right hand, and (D) ventral view of right foot. Drawing by Marcello Brotto.

It is 8.3 to 10.4 millimeters long, with the head accounting for 34% of the size. The snout is small and almost as long as the eye, appearing rounded when viewed ventrally and laterally. The nostrils are protuberant and directed anteroventrally, the canthus rostralis is not noticeable, and the lips are close to the sigmoid. The loreal region is slightly concave and the eyes are protuberant. The tympanic membrane is imperceptible. Its tongue is as large as its body and the posterior part is not attached to the lower part of the mouth, and the choana is relatively small and rounded. Its limbs are relatively thin, with the upper limbs larger than the lower limbs. Its body is smooth, due to the lack of osteoderms, with the exception of the lateral and ventral thighs, which have small, circular or oval glands. From an osteological point of view, it is quite similar to other individuals of the genus. It has fewer fingers than other species.

It is brown all over its body, with some individuals having a few yellow dots on the belly and a faint, dark X on the front of the back. Its iris is black with golden dots.

The species is very resistant to cold and feeds on invertebrates that live on the ground, such as mites, spiders and ants. In one of the specimens analyzed a large isopod was found, which are usually eaten by amphibians of the genus. They have direct development and cannot swim or jump. They croak during the day, unlike what is commonly seen in anuran species.
