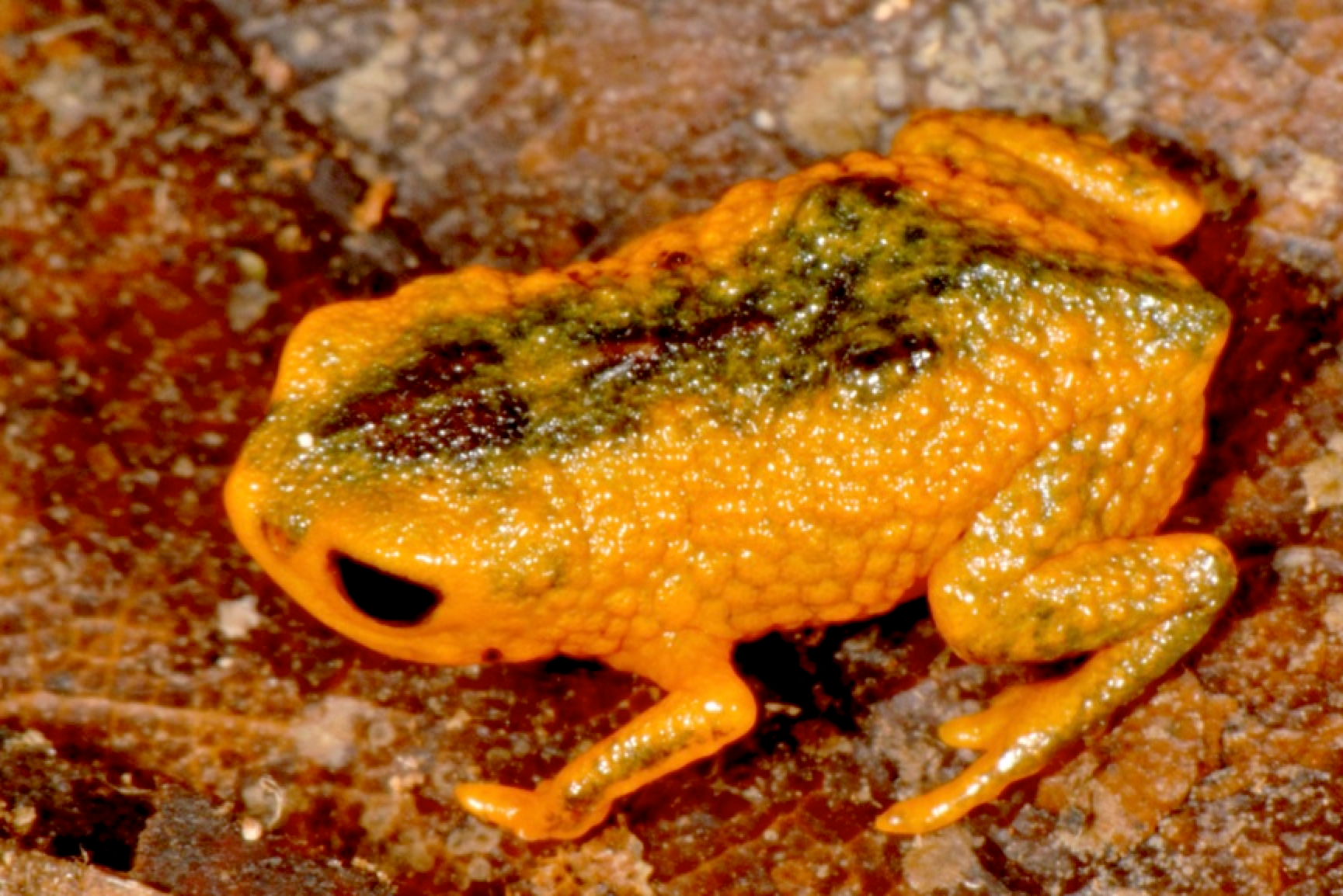

Scientific classification
- Kingdom: Animalia
- Phylum: Chordata
- Class: Amphibia
- Order: Anura
- Family: Brachycephalidae
- Genus: Brachycephalus
- Species: B. fuscolineatus

Binomial name
- Brachycephalus fuscolineatus Ribeiro et al., 2015

= Brachycephalus fuscolineatus =

Species of frog

Brachycephalus fuscolineatus is a species of frog in the family Brachycephalidae. It is very tiny and was one of seven new species described by LF Ribeiro and a team of scientists from the Mater Natura - Instituto de Estudos Ambientais in Brazil. Like all species in its genus, it is found in a very small strip of Atlantic Forest in the southeastern coast of the country, and has a vibrant colour pattern. The speciation seen in this genus is thought to be a byproduct of the rift between the valley versus mountain terrain and its particular microclimates, to which they are adapted. It might be in population decline due to habitat loss.

Its name is derived from the Latin fuscus, meaning "dark" or "swarthy", and lineatus, meaning "of a line", alluding to the characteristic dark stripe across the dorsum of this species.

== Description ==
This species is distinguished from its cogenerates by possessing a robust and bufoniform body, the adult average length between 9.7 to 12.4 millimetres (0.38 to 0.49 in); its rough dorsum; and general coloration being predominantly yellow, with a stripe along its vertebral column varying from a dark brownish colour to black. The skin on its dorsum shows no dermal co-ossification. Being a representative of the pernix group, its rugose body dorsum is similar to B. mariaeterezae's, as opposed to the smooth dorsum found in B. izecksohni and B. brunneus, for example. The stripe along this species dorsum is similar to B. ferruginus', although the simultaneous orange coloration on the sides and belly of Brachycephalus fuscolineatus differs from the former's yellow coloration. Brachycephalus fuscolineatus lacks the dermal co-ossification characteristic of the ephippium group species, and its shape and larger body size distinguish it from the species in the didactylus group, which are, on average, smaller and have a leptodactyliform shape.

== Distribution ==
Brachycephalus fuscolineatus is only known from its type locality, in Morro do Baú in the State of Santa Catarina at 680 metres (2,230 ft) above sea level.
