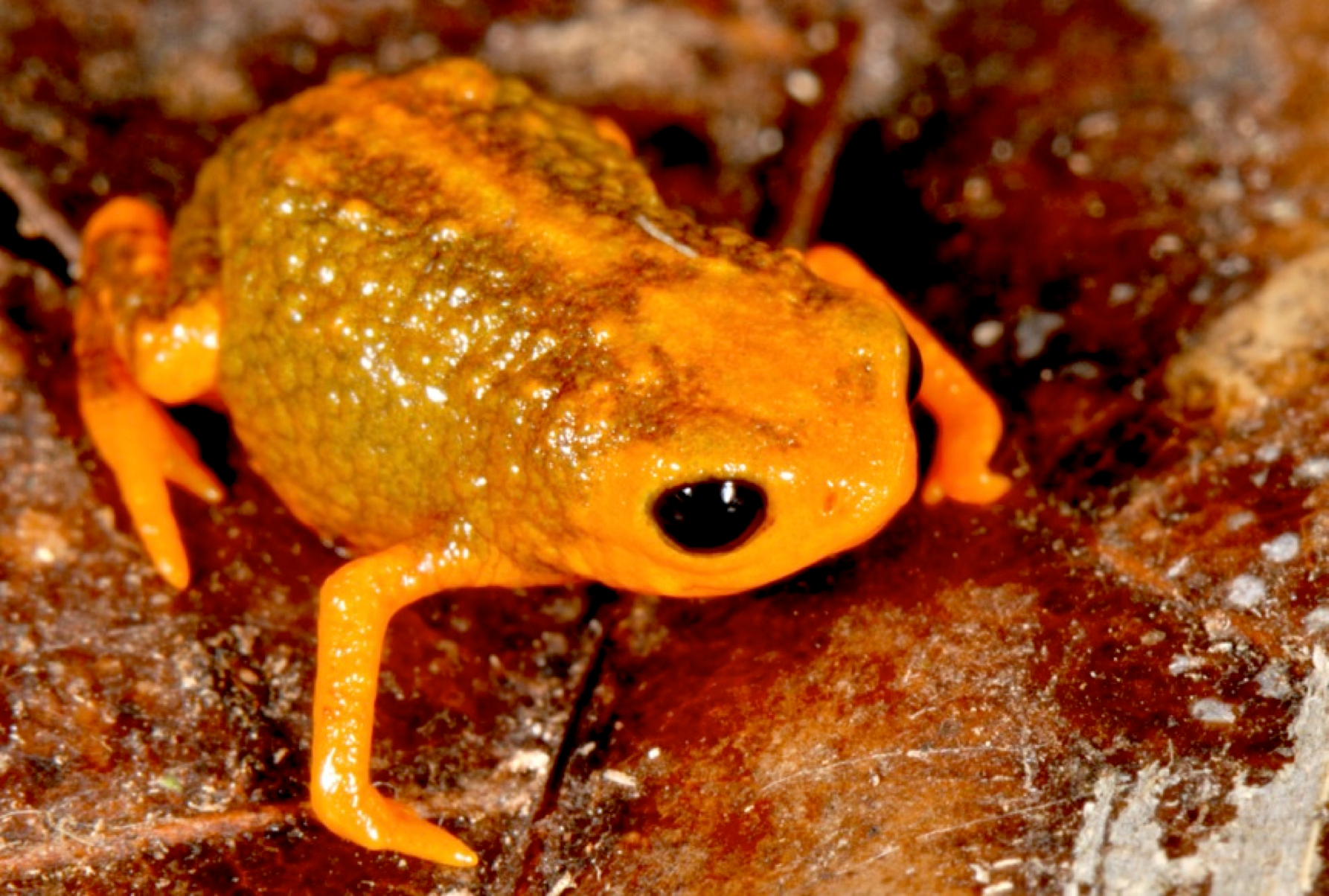

Scientific classification
- Kingdom: Animalia
- Phylum: Chordata
- Class: Amphibia
- Order: Anura
- Family: Brachycephalidae
- Genus: Brachycephalus
- Species: B. boticario

Binomial name
- Brachycephalus boticario Ribeiro et al., 2015

= Brachycephalus boticario =

Species of frog

Brachycephalus boticario is a species of frog in the family Brachycephalidae. It is very tiny and was one of seven new species described by LF Ribeiro and a team of scientists from the Mater Natura - Instituto de Estudos Ambientais in Brazil. Like all species in its genus, it is found in a very small strip of Atlantic Forest in the southeastern coast of the country, and has a vibrant colour pattern. The speciation seen in this genus is thought to be a byproduct of the rift between the valley versus mountain terrain and its particular microclimates, to which they are adapted. It might be in population decline due to habitat loss. The species name pays homage to the Fundação Grupo Boticário de Proteção à Natureza, which partially funded the fieldwork of the study originally describing the frog.

== Description ==
This species is distinguished from its cogenerates by having a robust and bufoniform body, with an average adult length of between 10 and 12.7 millimetres (0.39 and 0.50 in); a rough dorsum; its overall light-brown colouration, turning a yellow colour on its ventral region of its legs, arms, the head's dorsum and as a stripe along its vertebral column. The skin on its dorsum shows no dermal co-ossification. Being a representative of the pernix group, its appearance is highly similar to B. pernix's, but is distinct from the latter by its rugose dorsum. Its rugose body dorsum is similar to that of B. verrucosus, as opposed to B. leopardus' smooth dorsum. Brachycephalus boticario lacks the dermal co-ossification proper of species in the ephippium group, and its shape and larger size distinguish it from species in the didactylus group, which are smaller on average and have a leptodactyliform body.

== Distribution ==
Brachycephalus boticario is only known from its type locality, Morro do Cachorro, at a height of 795 metres (2,608 ft) above sea level, in the State of Santa Catarina.
