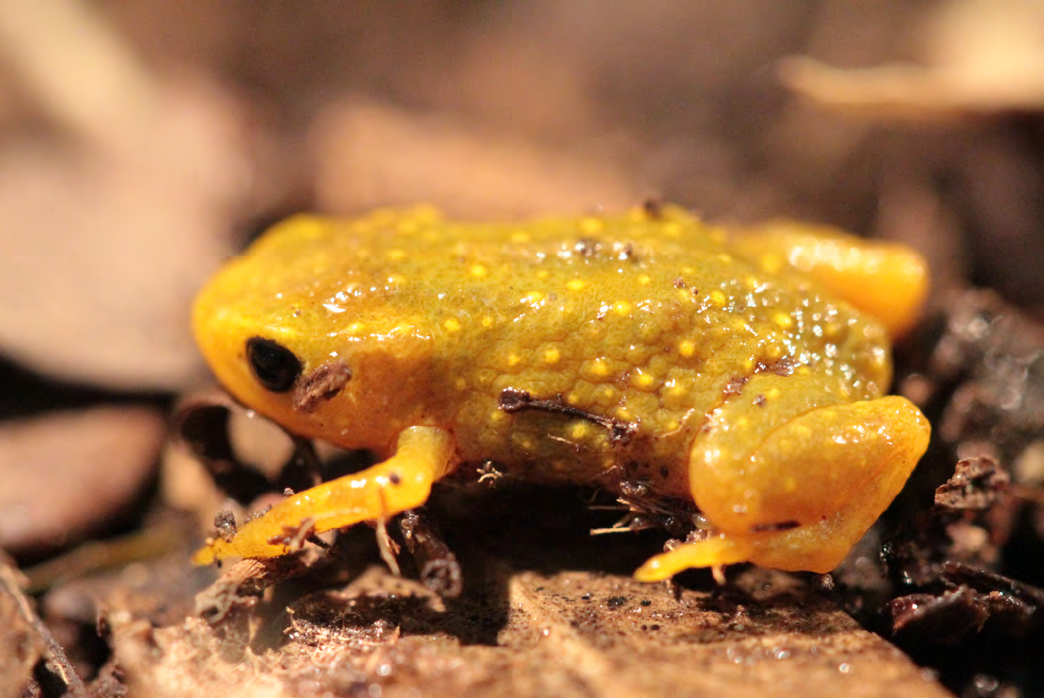
- Specimen from near Osasco

Conservation status
- Data Deficient (IUCN 3.1)

Scientific classification
- Kingdom: Animalia
- Phylum: Chordata
- Class: Amphibia
- Order: Anura
- Family: Brachycephalidae
- Genus: Brachycephalus
- Species: B. nodoterga

Binomial name
- Brachycephalus nodoterga Miranda-Ribeiro, 1920

Synonyms
- Brachycephalus ephippium var. nodoterga Miranda-Ribeiro, 1920 (basionym)

= Brachycephalus nodoterga =

Serra Cantareira saddleback toad

Species of frog

Brachycephalus nodoterga, also known as the Serra Cantareira saddleback toad, is a species of frog in the family Brachycephalidae. It is endemic to the eastern São Paulo state (both the mainland and Ilha de São Sebastião) of southeastern Brazil, and only known from five locations in Atlantic rainforest at altitudes of 700–900 m (2,300–3,000 ft).

== Description ==
Adult males measure about 12 mm (0.5 in) and adult females about 13 mm (0.5 in) in snout–vent length; the largest females can reach 14.5 mm (0.6 in) SVL. This tiny toad has bumpy skin and an overall yellow-orange colour, with its upperparts generally tending towards a duller and darker brownish-green hue. Unlike the more conspicuously coloured B. ephippium and B. pernix, studies of B. nodoterga have not detected toxins in its skin or organs.

== Habitat and conservation ==
Little is known about its behavior, but like other saddleback toads it lives among leaf litter. Its conservation status was last reviewed by the IUCN in 2004 where regarded as data deficient (insufficient information for rating it), but an independent review in 2019 that used IUCN's criteria recommended that B. nodoterga should be recognised as vulnerable.
