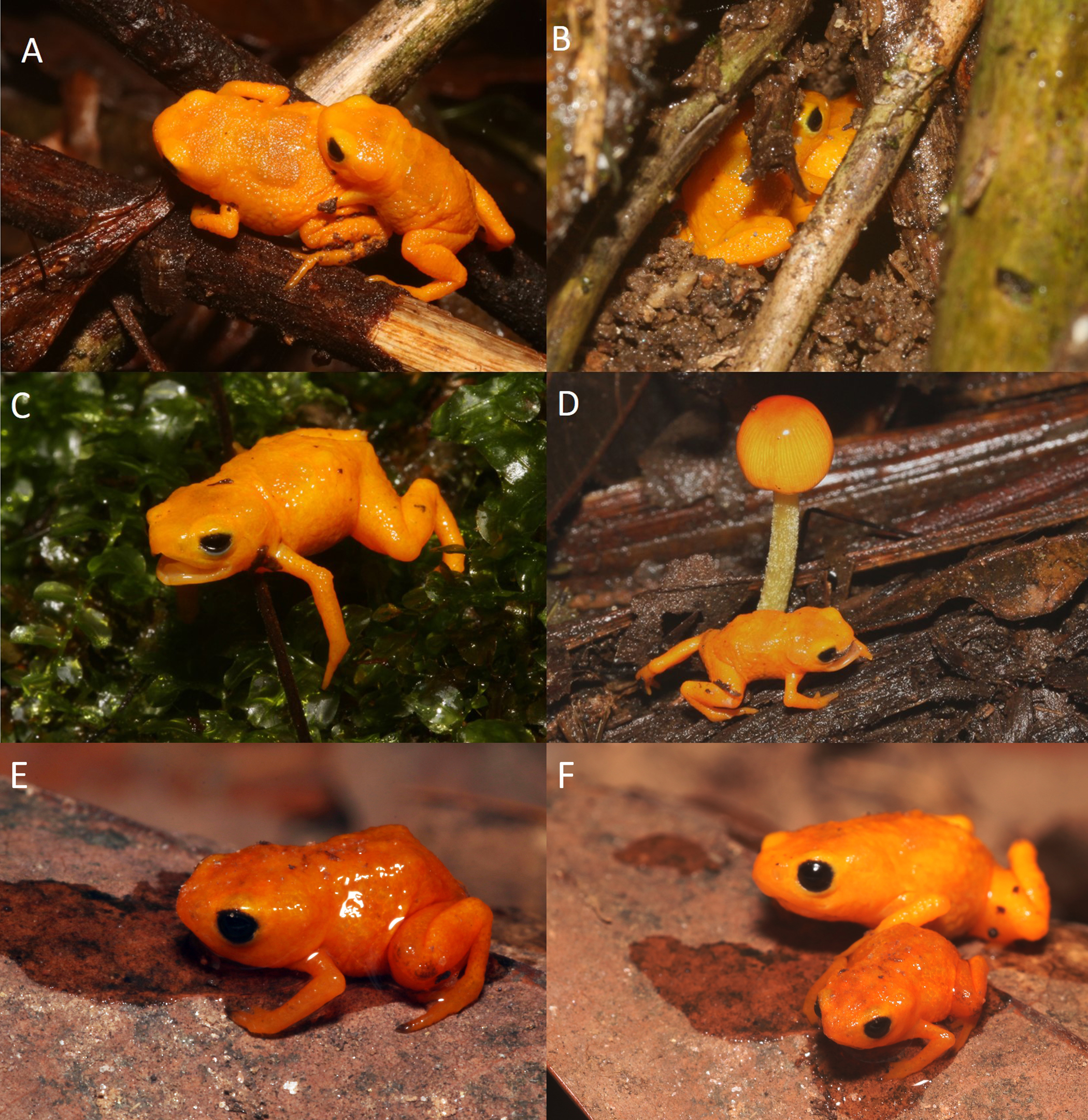
- Natural history observations of B. rotenbergae (A) inguinal amplexus; (B) an amplected couple under a juçara root system; (C) mouth gaping defensive behaviour; (D) specimen near a yellow/orange mushroom; (E) juvenile; (F) two juveniles, but the smaller one is darker

Scientific classification
- Kingdom: Animalia
- Phylum: Chordata
- Class: Amphibia
- Order: Anura
- Clade: Brachycephaloidea
- Family: Brachycephalidae
- Genus: Brachycephalus
- Species: B. rotenbergae

Binomial name
- Brachycephalus rotenbergae Nunes, Guimarães, Moura, Pedrozo, Moroti, Castro, Stuginski, and Muscat, 2021
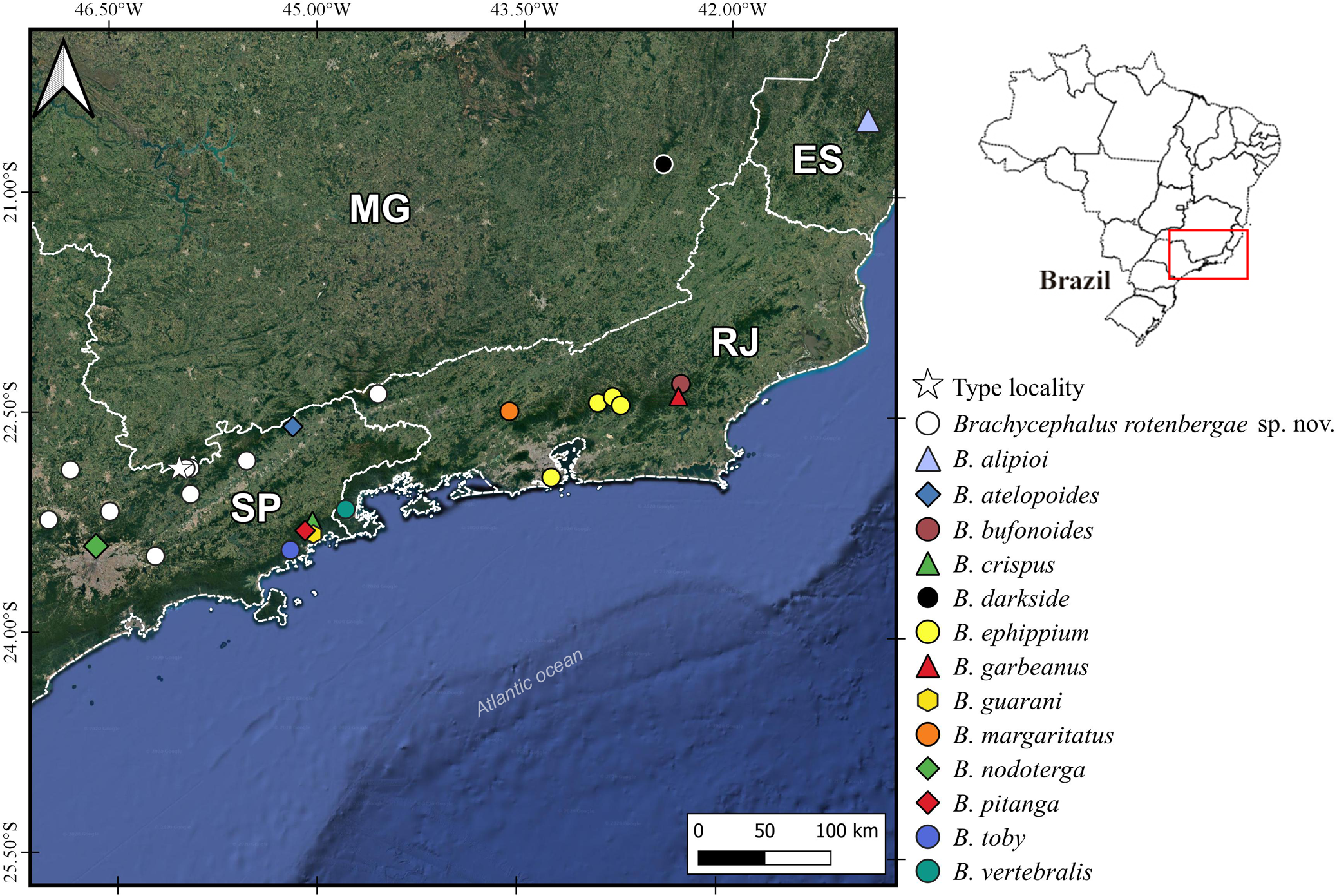
- Geographic distribution map for the species of Brachycephalus ephippium group

= Brachycephalus rotenbergae =

Species of toadlet

Brachycephalus rotenbergae is a species of toadlet in the family Brachycephalidae. It was first described in 2021. The species is found in the forests of the Brazilian state of São Paulo in the south Mantiqueira mountain range and the semidecidual forests.

== Description ==
Brachycephalus rotenbergae males are around 1.35 to 1.6 cm long with females being 1.6-1.8 cm long. The colors in this species may work as camouflage in their microhabitat, since there are great amounts of tiny yellow and orange leaves, mushrooms, and seeds on the ground, especially during the active season.

== Range ==
The species is native to Brazil in the state of São Paulo. It is found in the Mantiqueira mountain range and the semidecidual forests located in the municipalities of Mogi das Cruzes, Campinas, and Jundiaí.
