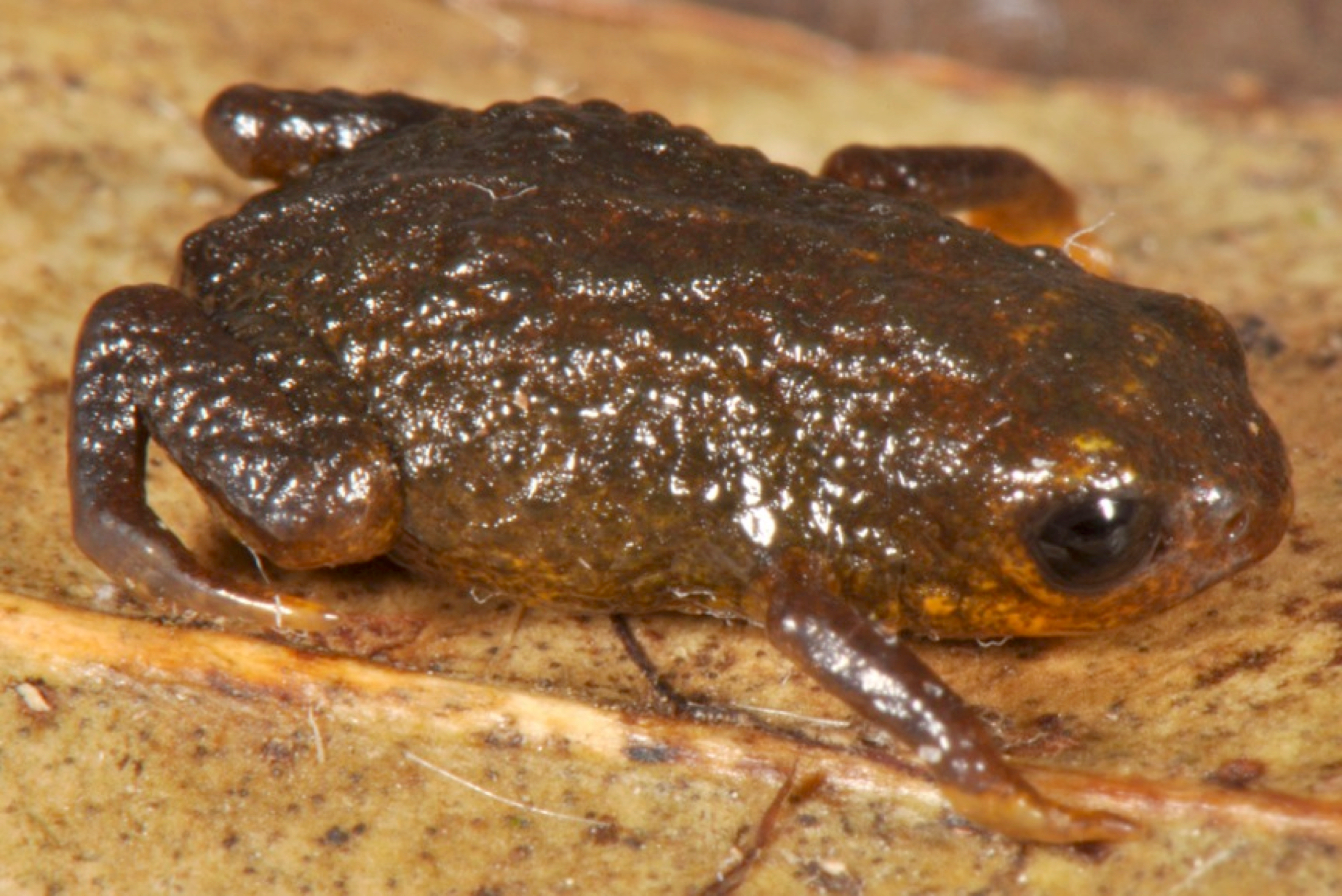

Scientific classification
- Kingdom: Animalia
- Phylum: Chordata
- Class: Amphibia
- Order: Anura
- Family: Brachycephalidae
- Genus: Brachycephalus
- Species: B. olivaceus

Binomial name
- Brachycephalus olivaceus Ribeiro et al., 2015

= Brachycephalus olivaceus =

Species of frog

Brachycephalus olivaceus is a species of frog in the family Brachycephalidae. It is very tiny and was one of seven new species described by LF Ribeiro and a team of scientists from the Mater Natura - Instituto de Estudos Ambientais in Brazil. Like all species in its genus, it is found in a very small strip of Atlantic Forest in the southeastern coast of the country, and has a vibrant colour pattern. The speciation seen in this genus is thought to be a byproduct of the rift between the valley versus mountain terrain and its particular microclimates, to which they are adapted. It might be in population decline due to habitat loss. Its name derives from the Latin olivaceus, "olive-colored", in reference to its coloration.

== Description ==
It is distinguished from other cogenerate species by having a robust body, bufoniform, with an adult length between 9.4 and 12.9 millimetres (0.37 and 0.51 in); a rough dorsum, and its general coloration being predominantly dark-green to brown. The skin on its dorsum shows no dermal co-ossification. Its rugose body is similar to that of B. mariaeterezae (as opposed to the smooth dorsum of other species such as B. izecksohni or B. pernix. Its predominantly dark-green dorsum is distinct from all other Brachycephalus species. The species does not present dermal co-ossification characteristic of species within the phippium group, while its bufoniform shape and larger body size means it is rather larger than those in the didactylus group, averaging a length of between 8 and 10 millimetres (0.31 and 0.39 in) and in turn having leptodactyliform body shape.

== Distribution ==
Brachycephalus olivaceus is known only from two localities, which are the base of the Serra Queimada and Castelo dos Bugres, a notable rock formation in the northeastern State of Santa Catarina.
