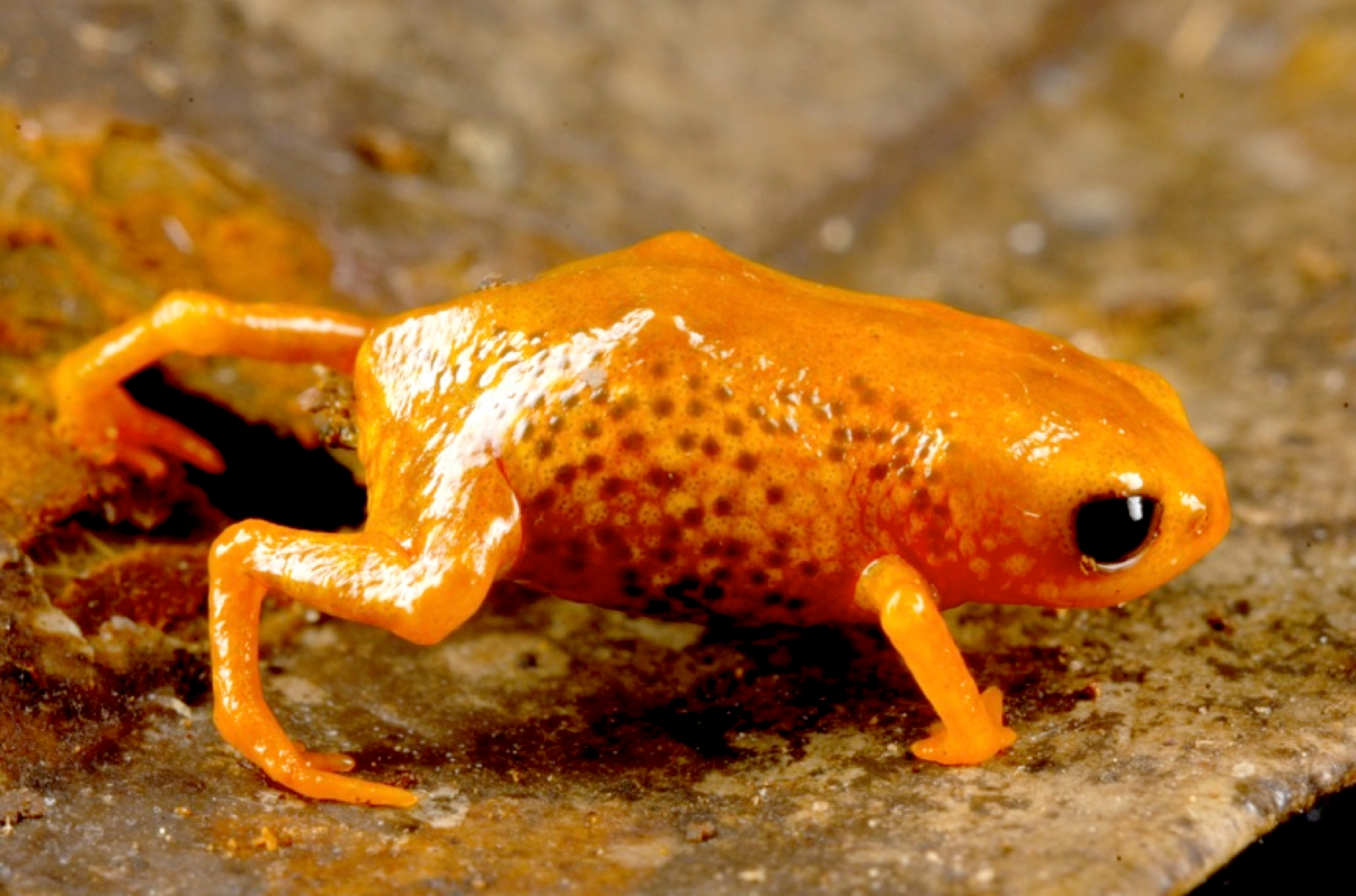

Conservation status
- Vulnerable (IUCN 3.1)

Scientific classification
- Kingdom: Animalia
- Phylum: Chordata
- Class: Amphibia
- Order: Anura
- Family: Brachycephalidae
- Genus: Brachycephalus
- Species: B. leopardus

Binomial name
- Brachycephalus leopardus Ribeiro, Firkowski, and Pie, 2015

= Brachycephalus leopardus =

Species of frog

Brachycephalus leopardus is a species of frog in the family Brachycephalidae. It is very tiny and was one of seven new species described by Luiz F. Ribeiro and a team of scientists from the Mater Natura — Instituto de Estudos Ambientais in Brazil. Like all species in its genus, it is found in a very small strip of Atlantic Forest in the southeastern coast of the country, and has a vibrant colour pattern. The speciation seen in this genus is thought to be a byproduct of the rift between the valley versus mountain terrain and its particular microclimates, to which they are adapted. It might be in population decline due to habitat loss. Its name derived from the Latin leopardus, referring to the frog's spotted pattern evocative of the felid genus Leopardus.

== Description ==
It differs from its cogenerate species by having a robust and bufoniform body, an adult averaging a size of between 9.7 to 11.9 millimetres (0.38 to 0.47 in); its smooth dorsum; and its orange coloration along its vertebral column, varying to yellow along its body's flanks, which in turn become increasingly verrucose. The skin on its dorsum shows no dermal co-ossification. The smooth dorsum of this species is similar to that of B. ferruginus, as opposed to the rugose dorsum of B. olivaceus, for instance. The species is unique among all Brachycephalus species in the presence of tiny dark spots on the dorsal portion of its head, thorax, legs, and arms, while at the same time possessing larger dark spots on the sides of its body. Brachycephalus leopardus lacks the dermal co-ossification characteristic to species in the ephippium group, and its shape and larger size distinguish it from species in the didactylus group, which are on average smaller and have a leptodactyliform shape.

== Distribution ==
Brachycephalus leopardus is only known from its type locality, Serra do Araçatuba in the State of Paraná at 1,640 metres (5,380 ft) above sea level and from the Morro dos Perdidos at 1,410 metres (4,630 ft) a.s.l.
