= Maria Tereza Jorge Pádua =

Brazilian ecologist

Maria Tereza Jorge Pádua (born 8 May 1943) is a Brazilian ecologist and environmentalist. She is known as the "mother of Brazil's national parks" for her efforts to establish reserves and parks in Brazil. She is president of FUNATURA, a global nature conservancy organization.

== Biography ==
Maria Tereza Jorge Pádua was born in São José do Rio Pardo on 8 May 1943. She studied agronomical engineering and in 1972 earned her master's degree in ecology from the University of Rio de Janeiro. She married and had three children.

In 1968 Jorge Pádua secured a position in Brazil's newly established national park system. She advanced to become one of the directors of the system in 1970. During the 1970s and 1980s she managed the parks department of the environmental protection agency. Under her leadership in the 1970s, nearly 20 million acres of Amazon basin reserves and parks were created. Miguel Serediuk Milano of the O Boticário de Proteção A Natureza Foundation said in 1999 that Jorge Pádua was responsible for "practically half of all protected areas in Brazil." She is known as the "mother of Brazil's national parks".

The organization oversees wildlife sanctuaries and a national park in the Cerrado. She started working full-time for the organization in 1993.

Following her appointment as president of the environmental protection agency, Jorge Pádua announced plans to increase the portion of Brazil's Amazon in the national park system from 6% to 30%.

== Awards and honours ==
- In 1981, Jorge Pádua received the J. Paul Getty Wildlife Conservation Prize with Paulo Nogueira Neto for his role in establishing national parks, advancing environmental legislation in Brazil, and supporting an ecological research station network. She established the organization Fundação Pró-Natureza (FUNATURA) in 1986.
- The frog species Brachycephalus mariaeterezae is named for her.

== See also ==
- Environmental issues in Brazil
