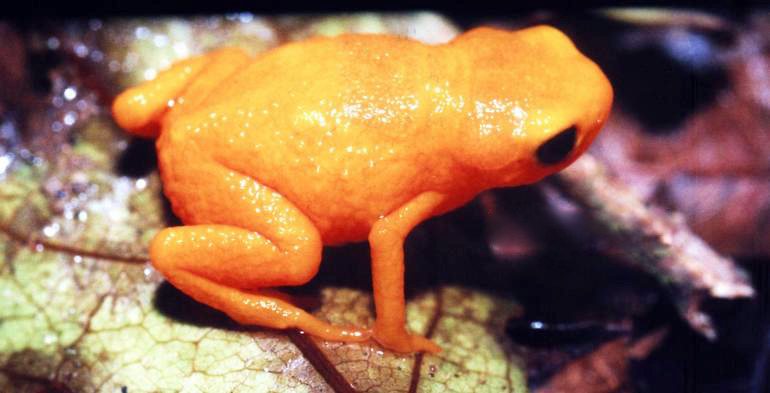
- Brachycephalus ephippium

Scientific classification
- Kingdom: Animalia
- Phylum: Chordata
- Class: Amphibia
- Order: Anura
- Clade: Brachycephaloidea
- Family: Brachycephalidae
- Genus: Brachycephalus; Fitzinger, 1826

Species
- More than 40, see text
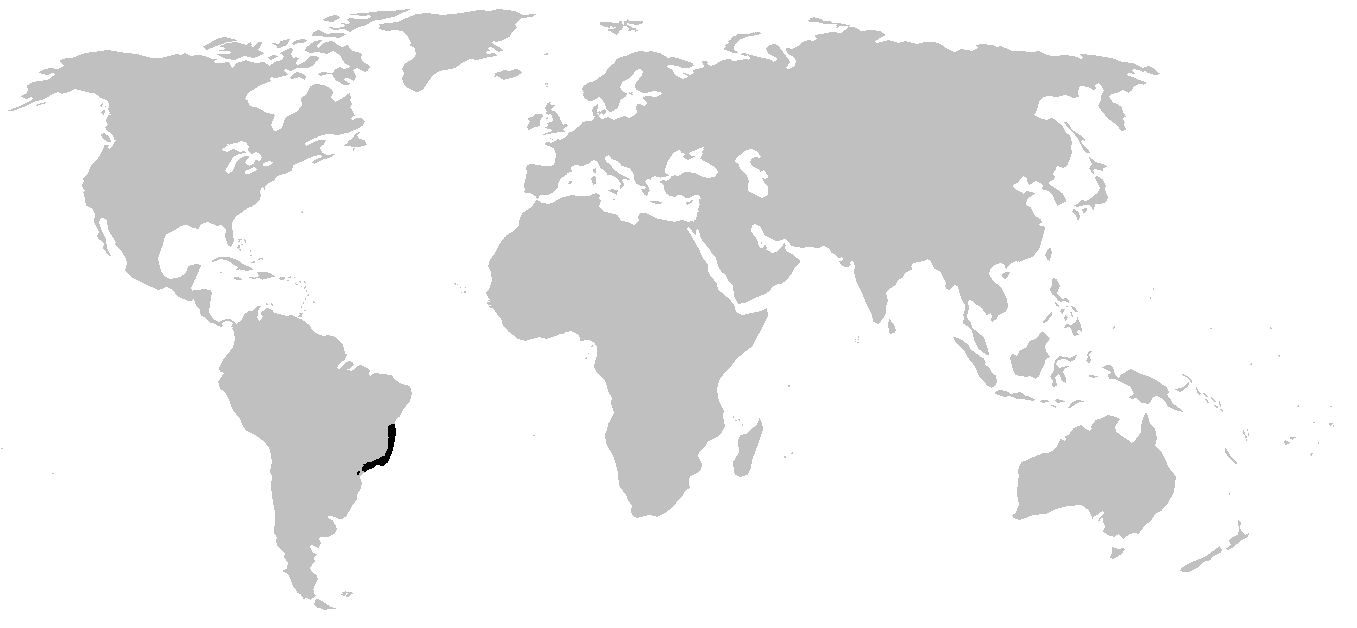
- Distribution of the family Brachycephalidae (in black)

Synonyms
- Ephippipher Cocteau, 1835; Psyllophryne Izecksohn, 1971

= Saddleback toad =

Saddleback toads

Genus of amphibians

Saddleback toads are members of the genus Brachycephalus, being very small anurans in the family Brachycephalidae. The genus is further divided into two species groups: the pumpkin toadlets and the flea frogs (or flea toads; once placed in genus Psyllophryne). Some pumpkin toadlets are toxic; their often bright colours are thus considered aposematic. In contrast, the overall brown and more frog-like flea frogs are some of the smallest frogs in the world, measuring around 1 cm (0.4 in) in snout–vent length.

The saddleback toads live among leaf litter in the Atlantic rainforest of southern Bahia to Santa Catarina in southeastern Brazil, ranging from near sea level to an altitude of 1,900 m (6,200 ft), with most species restricted to highland cloud forest. They are mostly diurnal, feeding on leaf-litter invertebrates and breeding through direct development, with eggs laid on land and hatching into young frogs, without a tadpole stage.

The majority of the Brachycephalus species have only been discovered and described in the 21st century. Most species have very restricted ranges and so are seriously threatened.

== Description ==
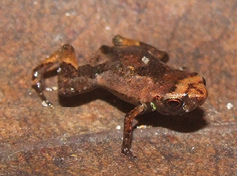
B. pulex is the smallest species in the genus; with its frog-like appearance and overall brown colour, it is a typical flea frog

The common name "saddleback toad" refers to the bony "shields" that cover their vertebrae; these have an unclear function in life and may not be present in some Brachycephalus species. The skin of the saddleback toads can be rugose (bumpy) or smooth. Their digits (toes and fingers) are reduced compared to most other frogs, with typically only two to four being clearly visible on each foot/hand. Some of the bones in their skull are also reduced.

The genus can be divided into two main subgroups: the pumpkin toadlets and the flea frogs. The pumpkin toadlet group comprises most species in the genus, overall having a toad-like morphology and being unable to jump well. The second group are the flea frogs or flea toads (B. didactylus, B. hermogenesi, B. pulex, and B. sulfuratus), which resemble leptodactylid frogs in appearance and morphology and are better jumpers. The name "flea frog" is also sometimes used for the unrelated Adelophryne.

Brachycephalus are very small frogs and adults range from 6.45 to 19.7 mm (0.254–0.776 in) in snout–to–vent length. Females tend to be larger than males of the same species. The flea frogs or flea toads are generally the smallest at 6.45–10.8 mm (0.254–0.425 in) in adults, but overlapping to some extent with the smallest species of pumpkin toadlets. Adults of the pumpkin toadlets are at least 8.3 mm (0.33 in), with most species about 9.5–13.5 mm (0.37–0.53 in), and the largest like B. darkside and B. margaritatus at least 14.8 mm (0.58 in). At 6.45–8.4 mm (0.254–0.331 in), B. pulex has the smallest minimum and maximum adult size reported in the genus. B. dacnis is similarly tiny, with a minimum snout–vent length of 6.95 millimetres (0.274 in). This makes them the smallest known frogs, with only the northeast Brazilian Adelophryne michelin, and Cuban Eleutherodactylus iberia and E. limbatus approaching their tiny dimensions. In other continents, the only similar-sized or slightly smaller frogs are a few species in the genera Mini, Paedophryne and Stumpffia. Newly hatched saddleback toads are much smaller than the already tiny adults. For example, they are typically 5.25–5.45 mm (0.207–0.215 in) in B. ephippium, a species where adults are at least 12.5 mm (0.49 in).

=== Colour and toxicity ===
Members of Brachycephalus vary greatly in colour and this is often useful for species identification. Individual variation may also be seen within each species, especially in the details of their pattern.

The flea frogs or flea toads are well-camouflaged, overall being brown with patterns of grey or near-black, and sometimes with a few poorly defined yellowish spots below. The remaining Brachycephalus species are at least partially yellow or orange in color, on both their ventral (underside) and dorsal surfaces; this orange coloration is referenced in the common name of these pumpkin toadlets. In some species, their yellow or orange coloration is almost uniform throughout their body, though many species are only partially yellow/orange. On the underparts, the yellow or orange may form a spotted or mottled pattern on a dull and dark background. On the upperparts, there can be spots, mottling or patches in black, brown, greenish, whitish or reddish. Two particularly dull-coloured species, B. brunneus and B. curupira, are overall brown, while a few others are essentially all-brown or greenish above (sometimes with whitish on the mid-back), limiting yellow or orange to the underparts. In species where known, including ones that are bright orange-yellow as adults, the newly hatched juveniles are mostly brown overall and may have white markings below.

The bright yellow, orange or reddish colours of the pumpkin toadlets are generally considered aposematic (warning colours), but toxicity has only been studied in a few species. The brightly coloured B. ephippium and B. pernix have tetrodotoxin and similar toxins in their skin and organs, whereas B. nodoterga, which has a much more subdued colouring but still with some yellow-orange, appears to be non-toxic. It is unknown how certain Brachycephalus species attain the strong neurotoxins, but they are possibly absorbed from the small invertebrates they eat, as known from some poison dart frogs and mantella frogs, or produced by bacteria inside their body.

At least two brightly coloured species, B. ephippium and B. pitanga, have bones that are fluorescent, which is visible through the skin of the toadlet when exposed to UV light. It was initially speculated that the fluorescent colour also is aposematic or that it is related to mate choice (species recognition or determining fitness of a potential partner), but later studies indicate that the former explanation is unlikely, as predation attempts on the toadlets appear to be unaffected by the presence/absence of fluorescence.

Primary examples of colours and patterns in pumpkin toadlets
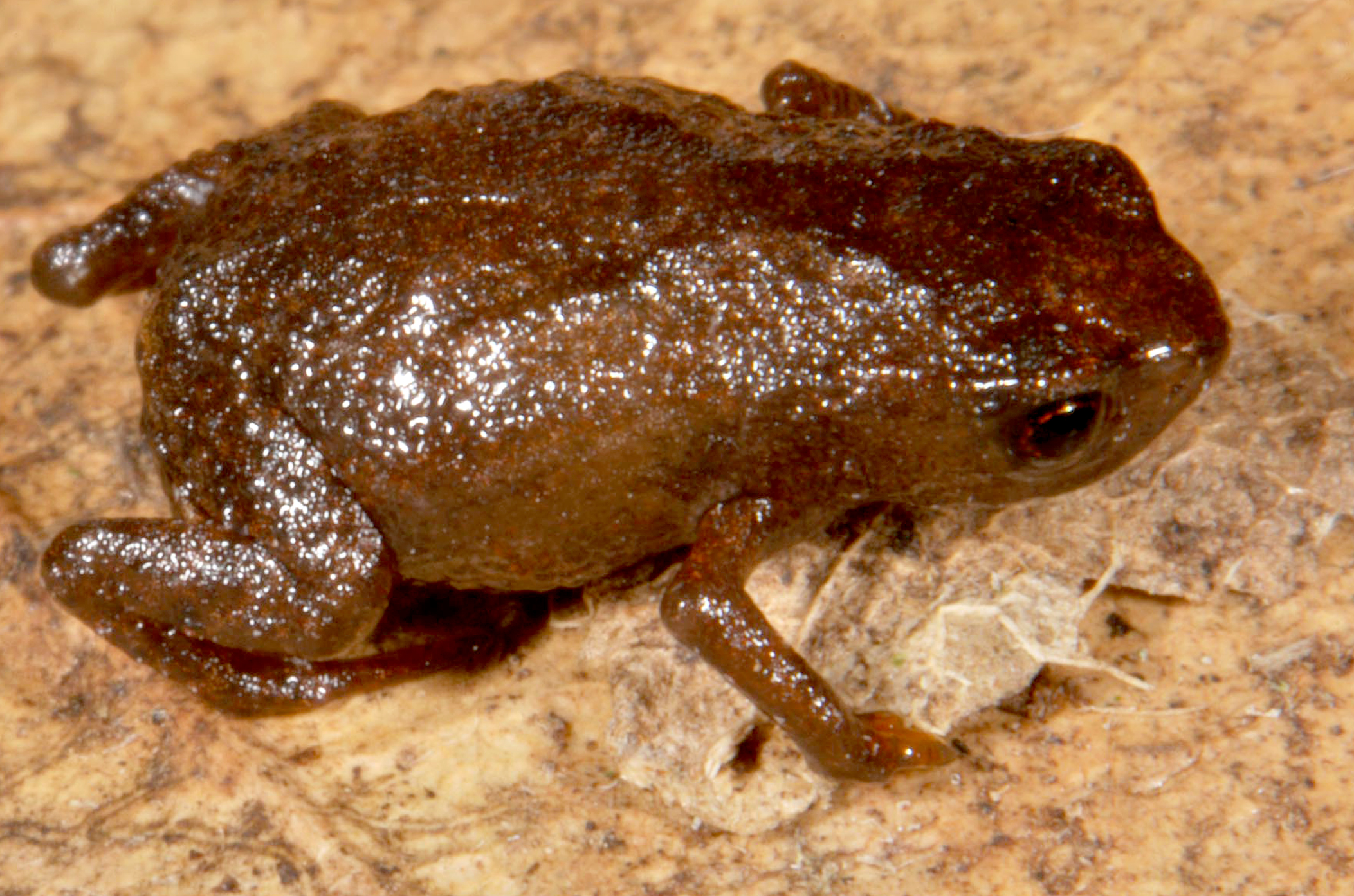
B. curupira (overall dull)

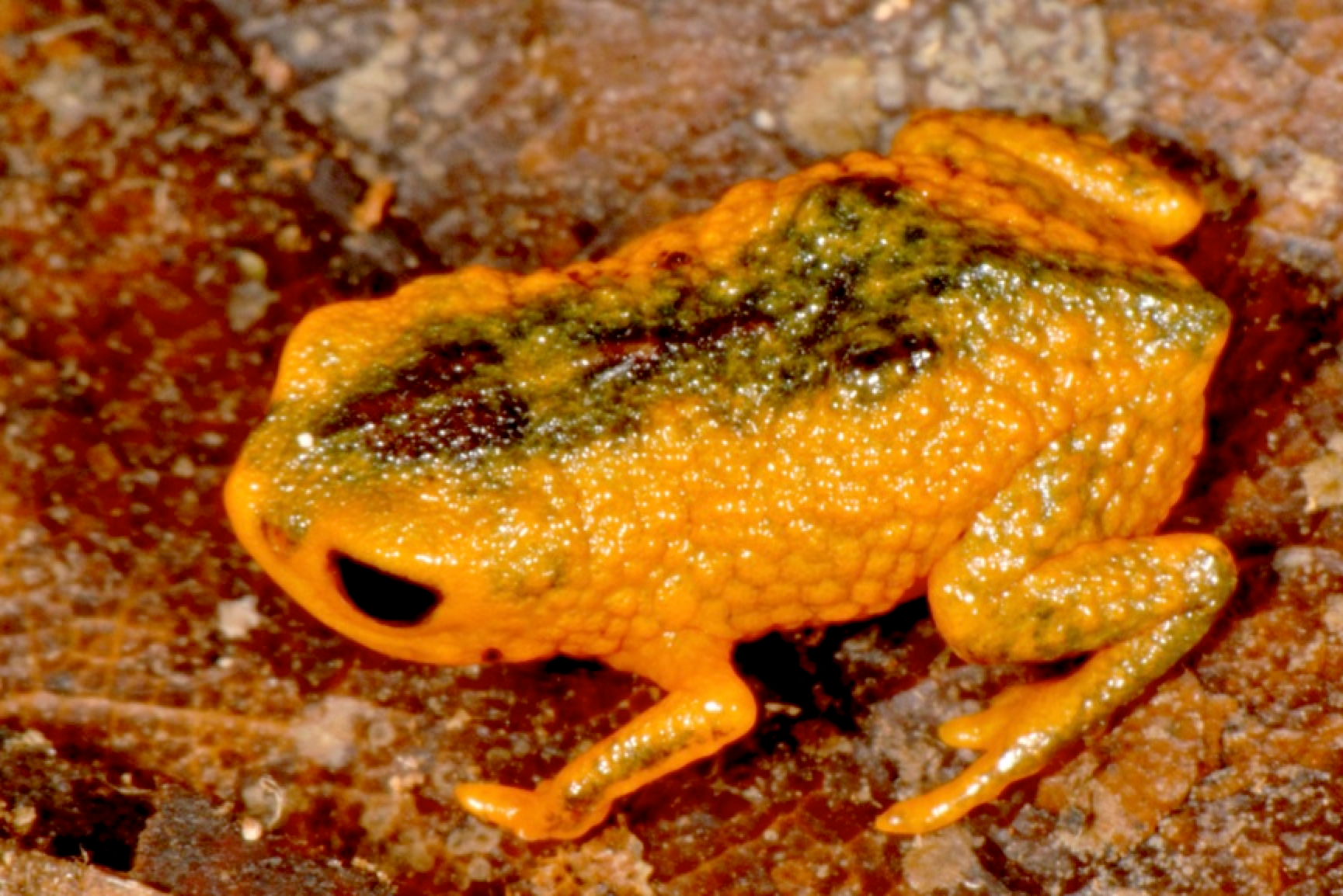
B. fuscolineatus (bright with dull sections above)

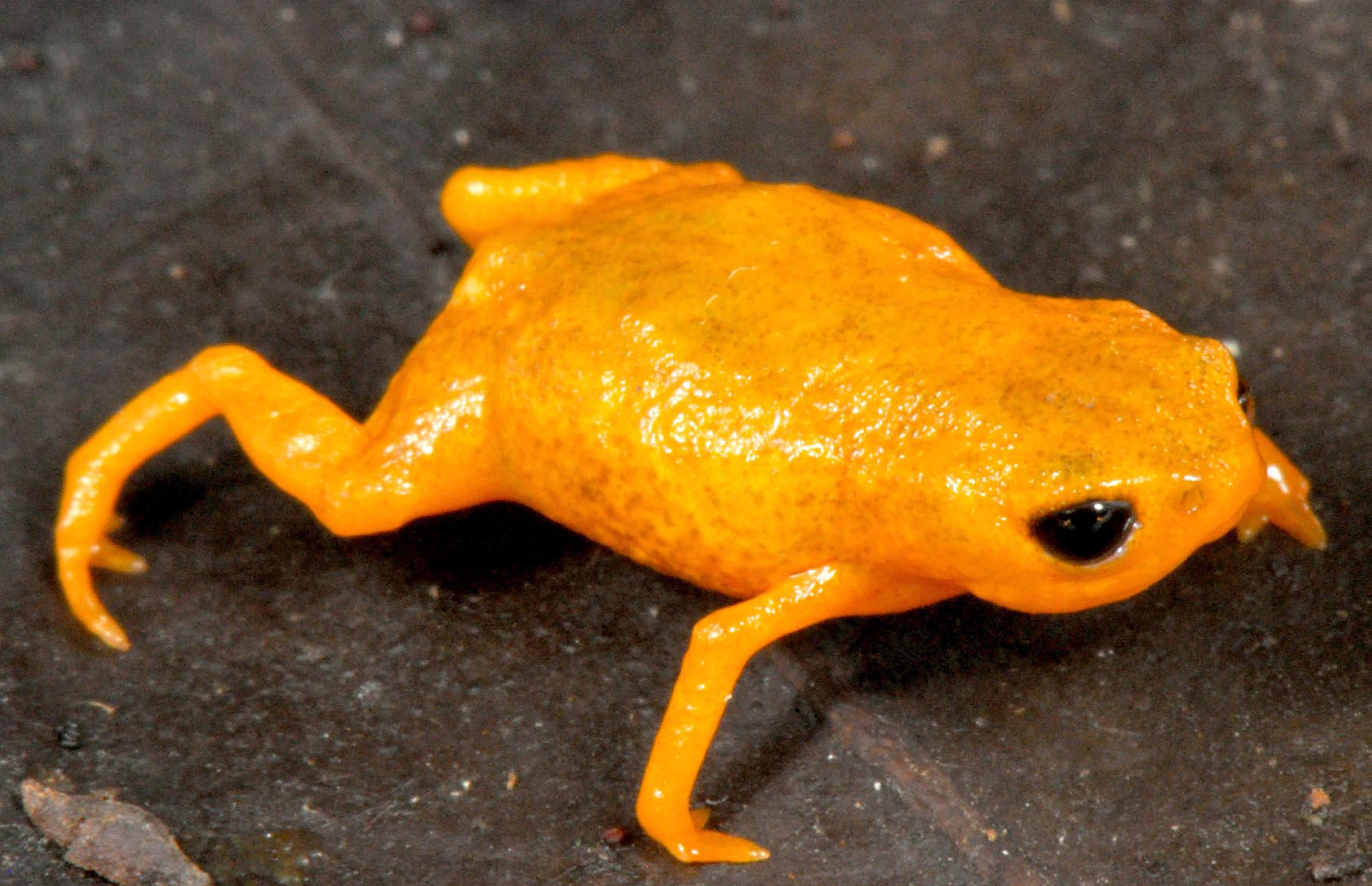
B. izecksohni (overall bright)

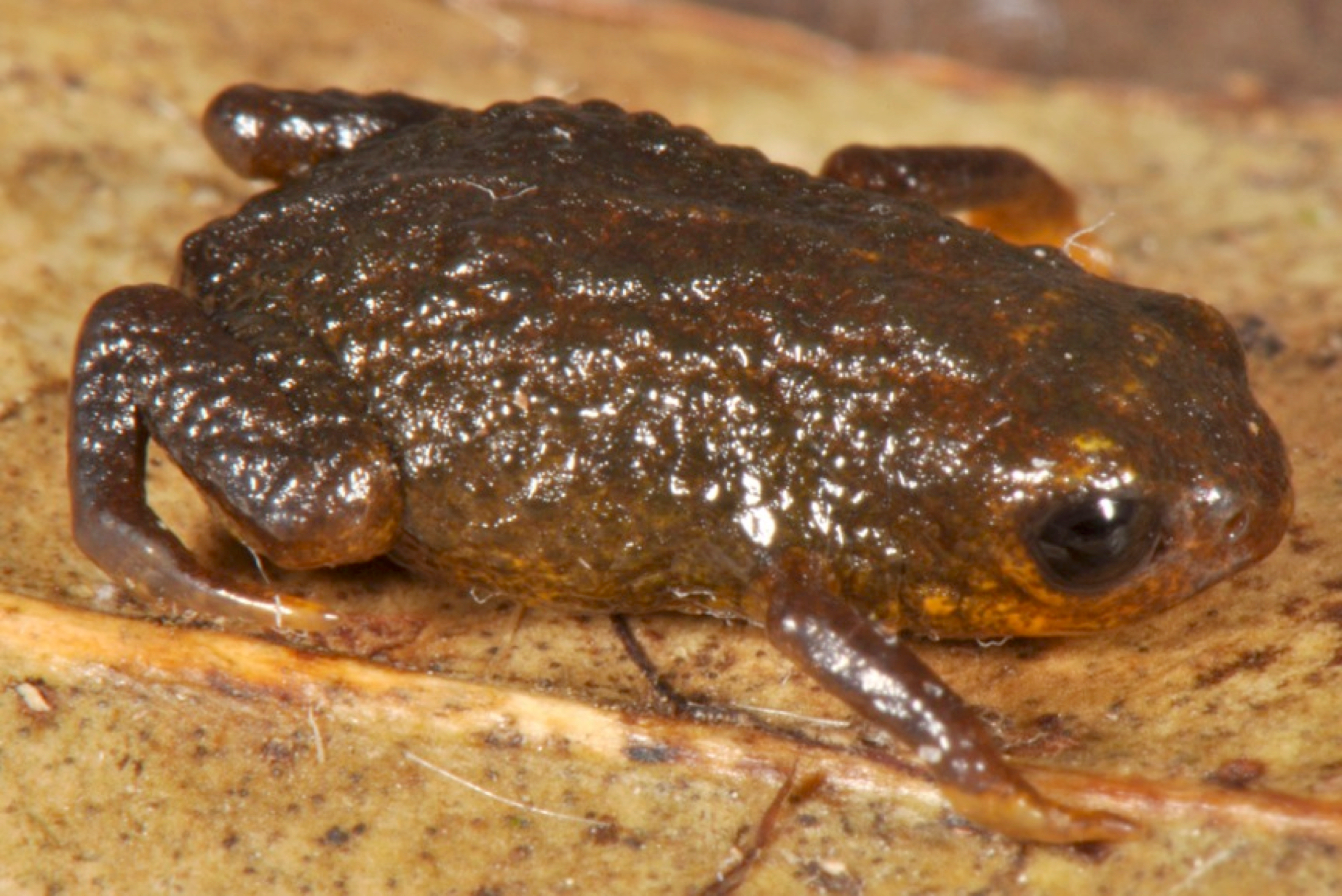
B. olivaceus (dull with bright markings below)

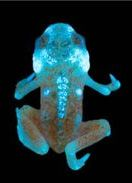
B. pitanga (fluorescence under UV-light)

=== Voice and hearing ===
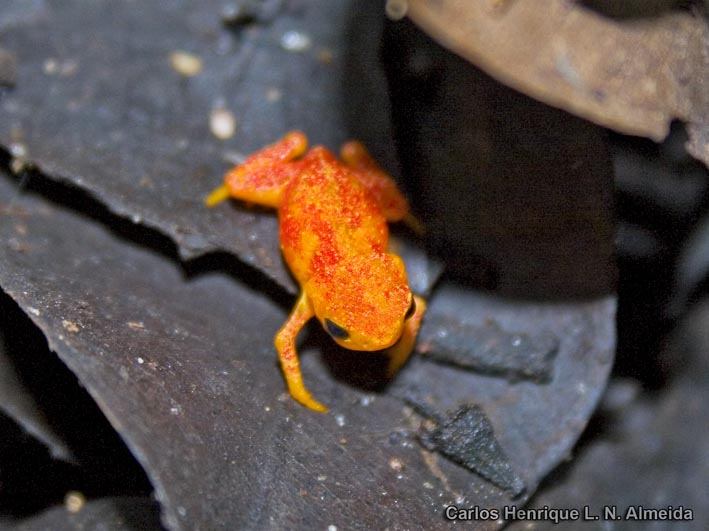
Unique among all animals, B. pitanga and at least one other pumpkin toadlet species are deaf to their own advertising calls

Although not very loud for a frog/toad (even relative to their tiny size), Brachycephalus are most often located in the field by their call. The primary callers are the adult males, but females and young may also call. As many as five calling males may be found in 1 m^{2} (11 sq ft), and at a single location one may hear tens of males at once. Males will defend their small territory from other males, but in most cases voice or visual displays are sufficient and fights are avoided.

The advertising calls by males are performed either from a hidden or an exposed position. Whether a species is dull or brightly coloured does not accurately predict if it prefers an exposed or hidden calling position. In addition to advertising calls, there are aggressive calls directed towards other males when close. The calls of the different species differ to various extent in frequency, speed, structure and other features.

Peculiarly, at least two species of pumpkin toadlets (B. ephippium and B. pitanga) are unable to hear the frequency of their own advertising calls, as their ears are underdeveloped (though they can still hear in other frequencies). They instead appear to rely on other communication methods, such as the vocal sac that inflates when calling, mouth gaping, and waving of their arms. It is speculated that their calling behavior is a vestigial behavior from their ancestral form, whereas their reduced hearing ability is a novel change in these species. Sound production may make them more vulnerable to predators, but there has likely been little direct evolutionary pressure to lose it because of their toxicity. Unlike B. ephippium, B. pitanga and some others, many species in the genus always call from a hidden position, making any signalling by movements inefficient, and it is likely they can hear their own calls. Direct studies of the medium-brightly coloured (mostly dull above, bright below) pumpkin toadlet B. actaeus and the dull-coloured flea frog B. hermogenesi strongly suggest that they are able to hear their own calls.

== Classification ==
Brachycephalus lacks a Bidder's organ, but were historically included in the true toad family Bufonidae, where one of the defining features is its presence. Brachycephalus was subsequently placed in Atelopodidae or Brachycephalidae, with the latter being the generally accepted treatment in recent decades. Initially some authorities placed numerous genera in Brachycephalidae, while others limited it to only contain the genus Brachycephalus. Today, Brachycephalus, along with Ischnocnema, comprise the family Brachycephalidae, which is a member of the larger clade Brachycephaloidea. Brachycephaloids are uniquely characterized by undergoing direct development, meaning individuals hatch from eggs as tiny versions of the adult, rather than tadpoles. The placement of Brachycephalus within this clade is shown in the cladogram below:

- Brachycephaloidea
  - Ceuthomantidae
  - - Neblinaphrynidae
    - - - Craugastoridae
        - Strabomantidae
      - - Eleutherodactylidae
        - - Caligophrynidae
          - Brachycephalidae
            - Ischnocnema
            - Brachycephalus

More than 40 species of Brachycephalus are recognized. Within Brachycephalus, there are two rather distinctive albeit polyphyletic groups: the pumpkin toadlets, characterized by their brighter colors (red, orange, yellow, and green patterns) and bufoniform (more stout) body blan; and the "flea-toads", characterized by their dull colors and leptodactyliform (more slender) body plan. Until 2002, the latter group, which is relatively widespread, was regarded as a separate genus, Psyllophryne, but it is now considered a synonym of Brachycephalus. The pumpkin toadlets, which largely are restricted to highlands and foothills, can be further divided into two subgroups: the southern B. pernix subgroup (Paraná and Santa Catarina) and the northern B. ephippium subgroup (São Paulo and north). Among the pumpkin toadlets, colours alone are not a good indicator of phylogenetic relationships. For example, the brown B. curupira is closely related to the golden B. izecksohni and the brown B. brunneus is closely related to the golden B. leopardus, but these species pairs are more distant from each other.

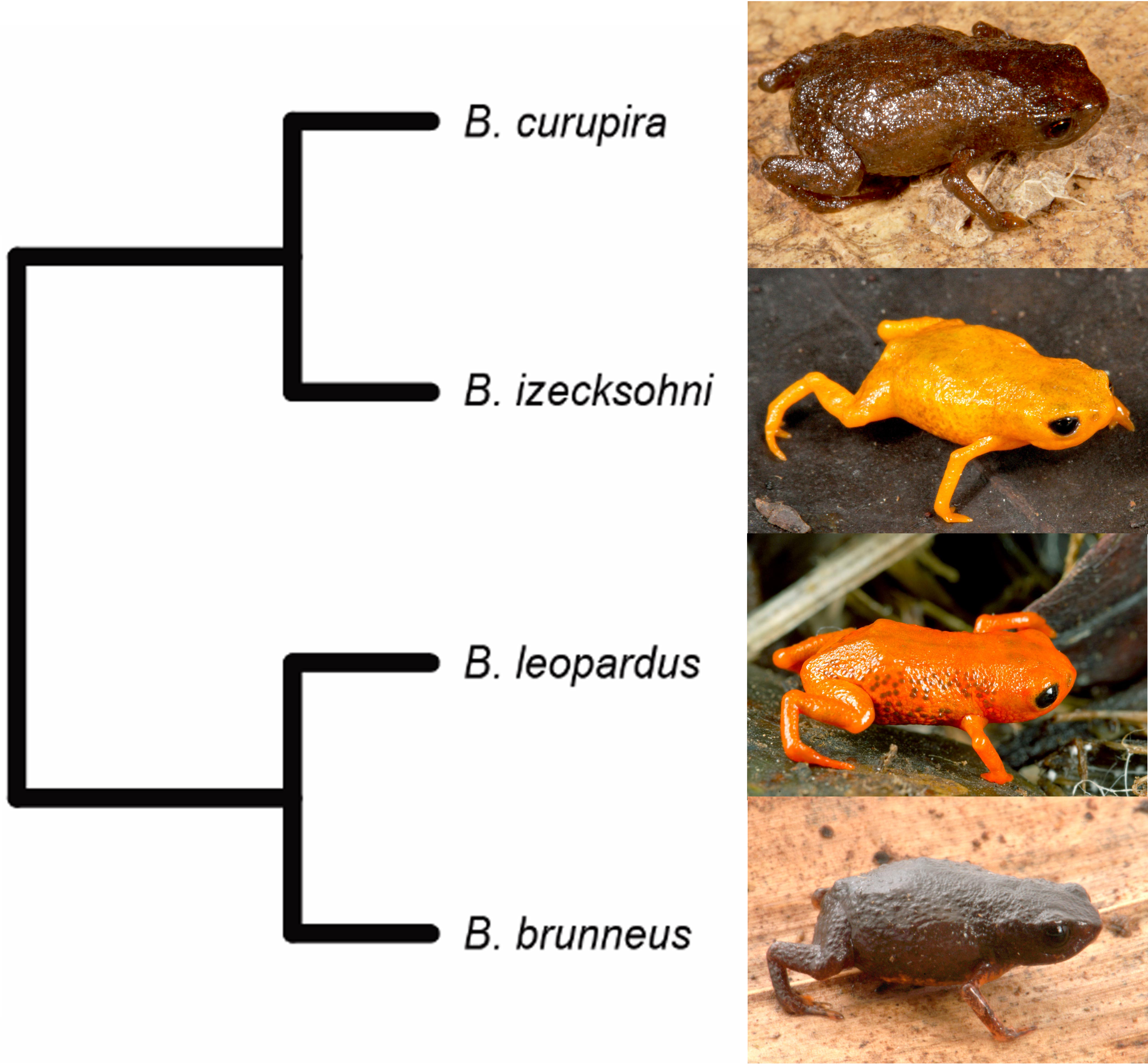
Phylogenetic relationship of four pumpkin toadlet species showing that colours alone are not a good indicator of relatedness

=== Species ===
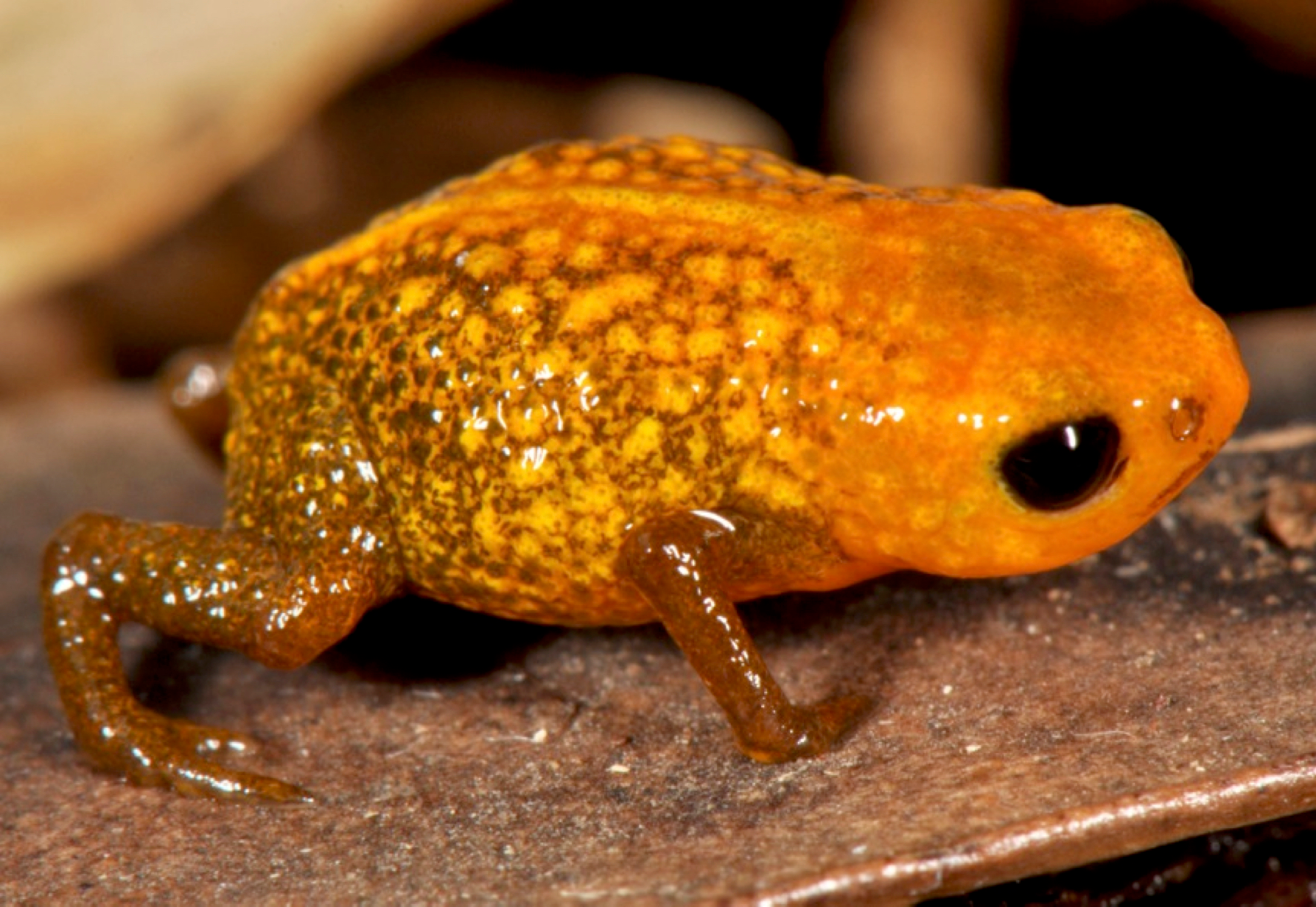
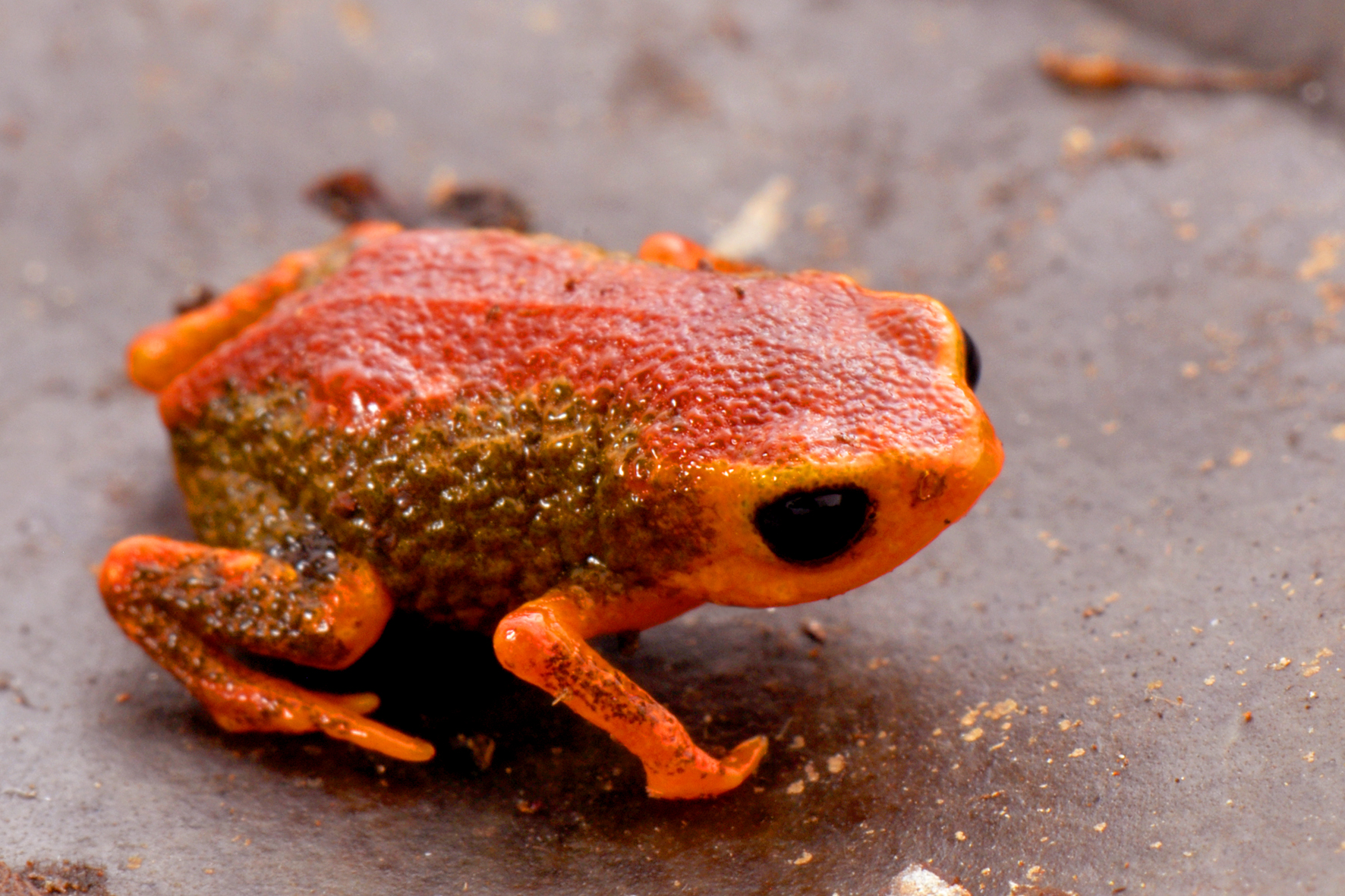
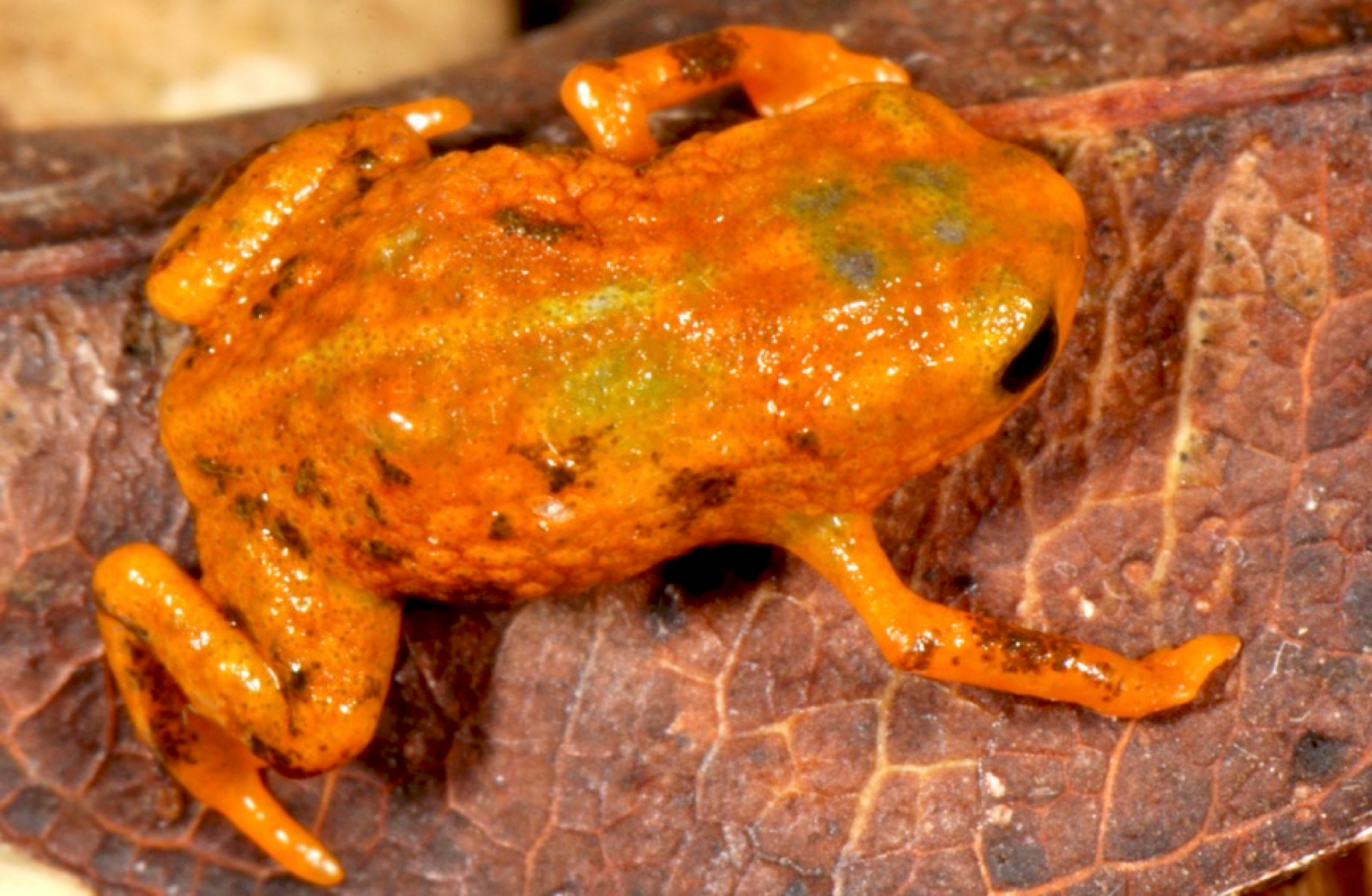

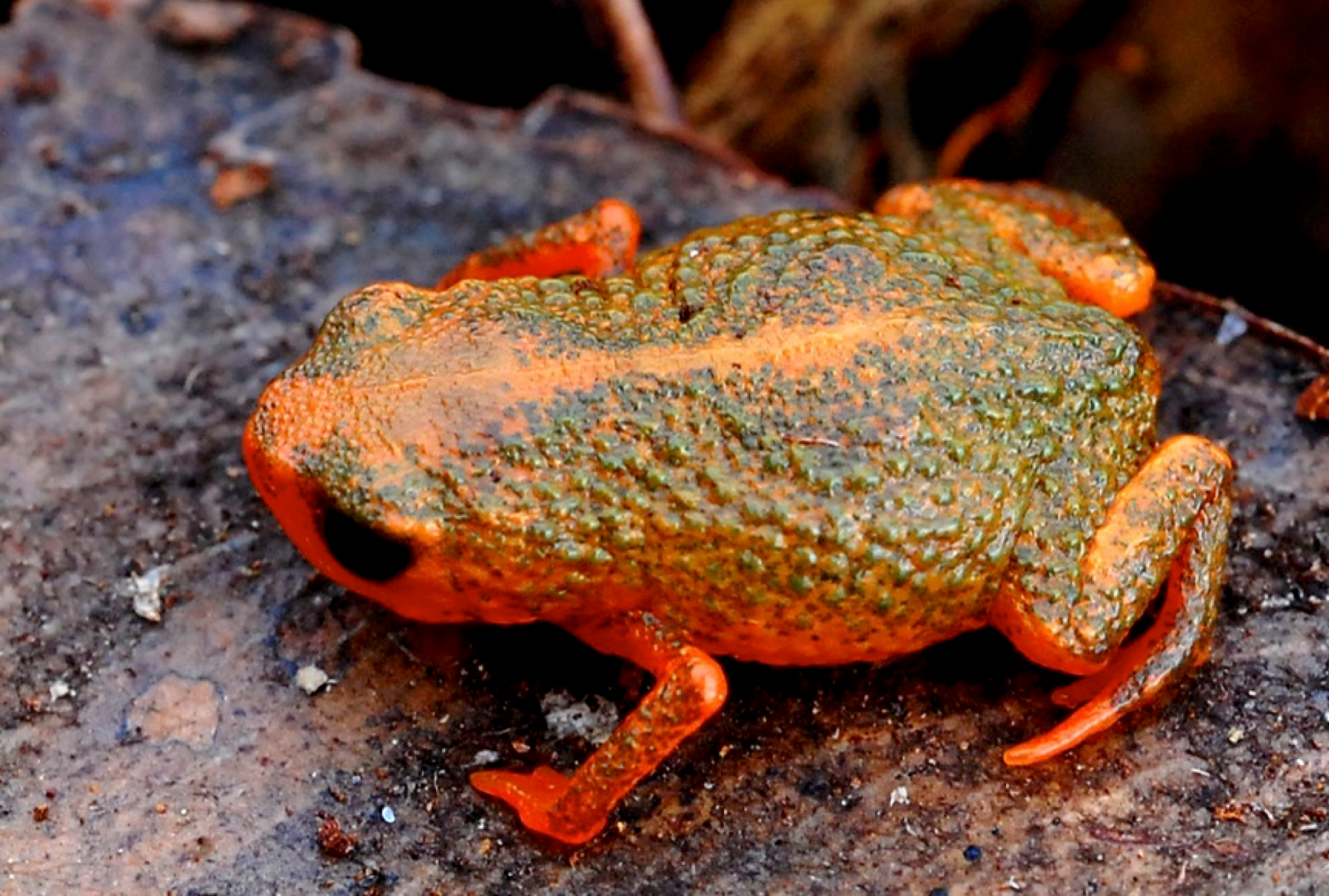
Top to bottom: B. auroguttatus, B. coloratus, B. mariaeterezae and B. verrucosus are four of the thirteen species that were scientifically described from 2015 to 2017

According to Amphibian Species of the World, the following species are recognised in the genus Brachycephalus:

- Brachycephalus actaeus Monteiro et al., 2018
- Brachycephalus albolineatus Bornschein et al., 2016
- Brachycephalus alipioi Pombal & Gasparini, 2006
- Brachycephalus atelopoide Miranda-Ribeiro, 1920
- Brachycephalus auroguttatus Ribeiro et al., 2015
- Brachycephalus boticario Ribeiro et al., 2015
- Brachycephalus brunneus Ribeiro et al., 2005
- Brachycephalus bufonoides Miranda-Ribeiro, 1920
- Brachycephalus clarissae Folly et al., 2022
- Brachycephalus coloratus Ribeiro et al., 2017
- Brachycephalus crispus Condez, et al., 2014
- Brachycephalus curupira Ribeiro et al., 2017
- Brachycephalus dacnis Toledo et al., 2024
- Brachycephalus darkside Guimarães et al., 2017
- Brachycephalus didactylus (Izecksohn, 1971)
- Brachycephalus ephippium (Spix's saddleback toad) (Spix, 1824)
- Brachycephalus ferruginus Alves et al., 2006
- Brachycephalus fuscolineatus Ribeiro et al., 2015
- Brachycephalus garbeanus Miranda-Ribeiro, 1920
- Brachycephalus guarani Clemente-Carvalho et al., 2012
- Brachycephalus herculeus Folly et al., 2024
- Brachycephalus hermogenesi (Giaretta & Sawaya, 1998)
- Brachycephalus ibitinga Condez et al., 2021
- Brachycephalus izecksohni Ribeiro et al., 2005
- Brachycephalus leopardus Ribeiro et al., 2015
- Brachycephalus lulai Bornschein et al., 2025
- Brachycephalus margaritatus Pombal & Izecksohn, 2011
- Brachycephalus mariaeterezae Ribeiro et al., 2015
- Brachycephalus mirissimus Pie et al., 2018
- Brachycephalus nanicus Nune et al., 2025
- Brachycephalus nodoterga (Serra Cantareira saddleback toad) Miranda-Ribeiro, 1920
- Brachycephalus olivaceus Ribeiro et al., 2015
- Brachycephalus pernix Pombal, Wistuba & Bornschein, 1998
- Brachycephalus pitanga (Red pumpkin toadlet) Alves et al., 2009
- Brachycephalus pombali Alves et al., 2006
- Brachycephalus pulex Napoli et al., 2011
- Brachycephalus puri Almeida-Silva et al., 2021
- Brachycephalus quiririensis Pie & Ribeiro, 2015
- Brachycephalus rotenbergae Nunes et al., 2021
- Brachycephalus sulfuratus Condez et al., 2016
- Brachycephalus tabuleiro Mângia et al., 2023
- Brachycephalus toby Haddad et al., 2010
- Brachycephalus tridactylus Garey et al., 2012
- Brachycephalus verrucosus Ribeiro et al., 2015
- Brachycephalus vertebralis Pombal, 2001

== Biology ==
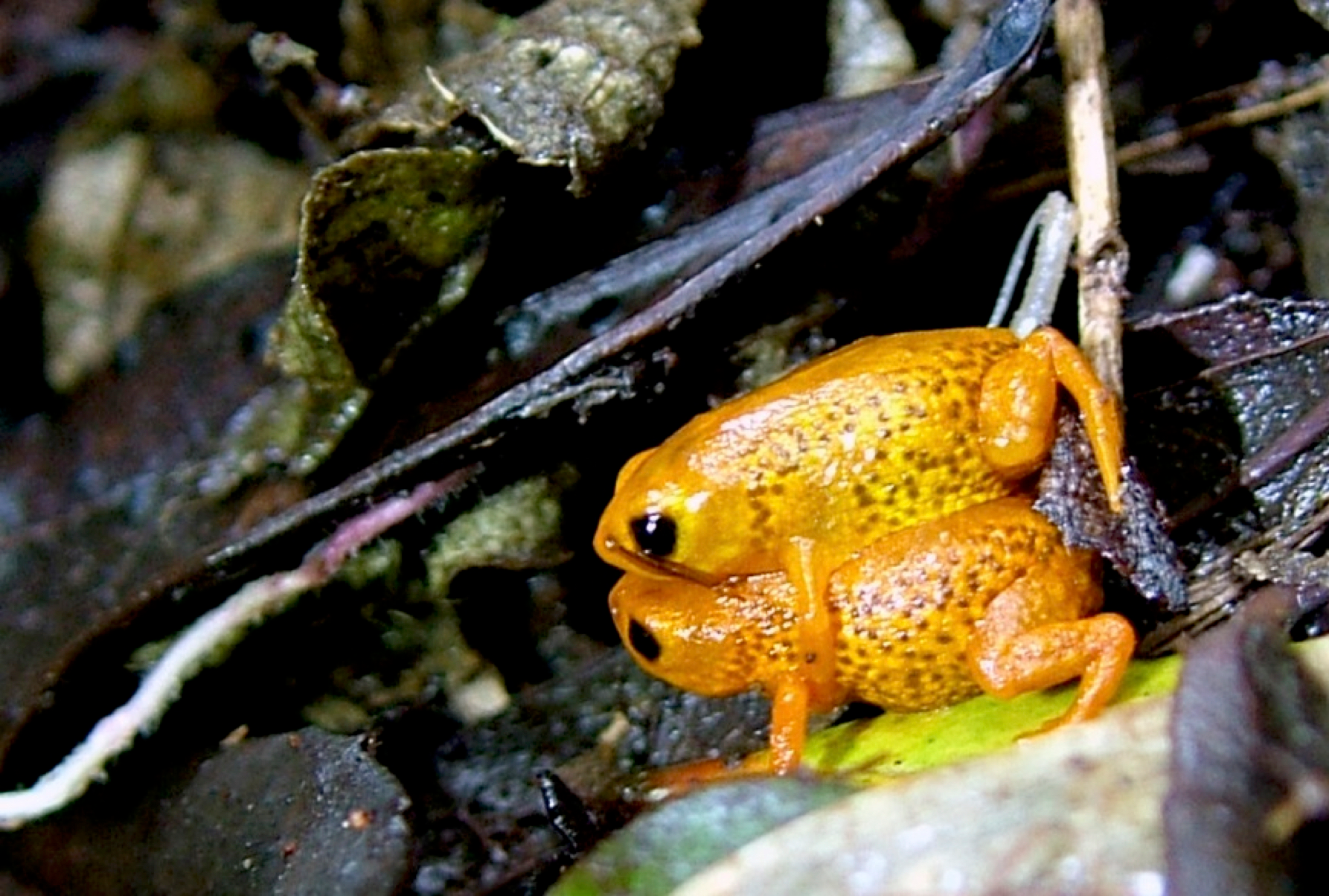
B. leopardus pair in amplexus

Saddleback toads live in the leaf litter on forest floors, but on occasion may move to higher perches up to 1 m (3.3 ft) off the ground. During dry conditions, both sexes tend to remain within the leaf litter and there is little noticeable activity, but during the wet season and high humidity the males and in some species also females may move to the top of the leaf litter. In some species, they often take up quite conspicuous positions during this time.

The saddleback toads are mostly active during the day, but some activity also occurs during the night and some species possibly are mostly nocturnal.

Relatively little is known about the feeding behavior of saddleback toads, but they will take a wide range of minute invertebrates. They are known to feed on insects (among others, ants, true bugs, beetles, grasshoppers and flies) and their larvae, along with springtails, mites, spiders, pseudoscorpions, millipedes, snails and isopods.

=== Jumping ===
B. coloratus jumping, showing a lack of balance

Unlike most amphibians, Brachycephalus are hindered in their ability to land reliably after jumping. Due to Brachycephalus' extremely small head and body size, vestibular systems in the genus are too small for dependable locomotion, and in turn the endolymph — which is regarded by Poiseuille's law — is not detected by sensory hairs and makes it difficult for individuals of Brachycephalus to sense changes in angular acceleration during a jump. For the same reason they move slowly when they walk. Because of the uncontrolled jumping and slow walking, they have evolved defense mechanisms such as toxicity and bony plates (osteoderms) as protection against predators.

=== Reproduction ===
In general, saddleback toads are reported to use axillary or nearly axillary amplexus where a male uses his front limbs to grab a female at her front limbs. However, whereas most frogs typically only use one technique, at least B. ephippium will use two, beginning with an inguinal amplexus (where the male holds the female around the lower waist, just in front of her hindlimbs) and only later changing to a nearly axillary position.

Based on the few species where the breeding behavior is known, the female saddleback toad lays about five or less yellow or yellow-white eggs, which are relatively large compared to the size of the adult. They are deposited in a hidden location (for example, under leaf litter or a tree log) on land. The female rolls them until they are covered in particles, making them almost indistinguishable from the soil where they have been laid, but it may also help to preserve their water content. After about two months, they hatch into juvenile toads/frogs. There is no tadpole or other aquatic stage.

== Relation to humans ==
=== Research history ===
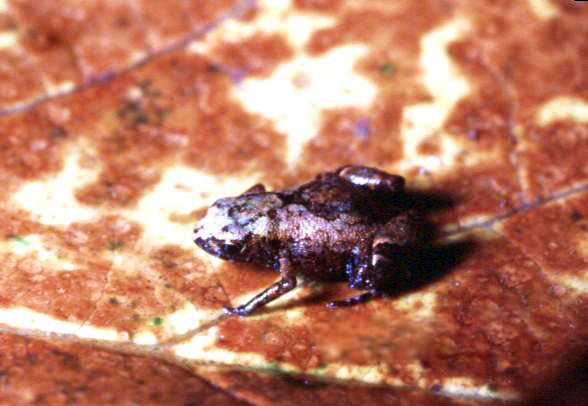
B. hermogenesi, one of the species initially placed in the flea frog genus Psyllophryne

The first species, Brachycephalus ephippium, was already described by Johann Baptist von Spix in 1824, but originally in the genus Bufo. Two years later the genus Brachycephalus was coined by Leopold Fitzinger. In 1920, four additional "variants" were described by Alípio de Miranda-Ribeiro, but in 1955 a review did not recognise them, arguing that they were synonyms of B. ephippium. Another species, B. didactylus, was described in 1971 by Eugênio Izecksohn, but placed in its own genus Psyllophryne. As a consequence, B. ephippium was the only widely recognised species in the genus; it was the pumpkin toadlet. In 1990, B. nodoterga (one of the variants that had been described in 1920) was instated as a valid species, bringing the number of generally recognised Brachycephalus species to two.

Starting in 1998, this changed dramatically. Since that year, there has been a couple of years at most between the description of new species and some years where several were described, peaking at eight species in 2015 alone. Additionally, the three remaining variants that had been described in 1920 were instated as valid species in 2010 and the former Psyllophryne species were moved into Brachycephalus in 2002. As of 2024, there were 42 recognised species of Brachycephalus. The many recently discovered species have mostly been the result of scientists visiting isolated highland peaks, so-called sky islands that are separated from each other by valleys. Although now generally recognised, the distinction of some of these recently described species has been questioned by some authorities since they often have been separated mainly by colour and skin texture, features that can be variable in frogs/toads.

=== Conservation ===
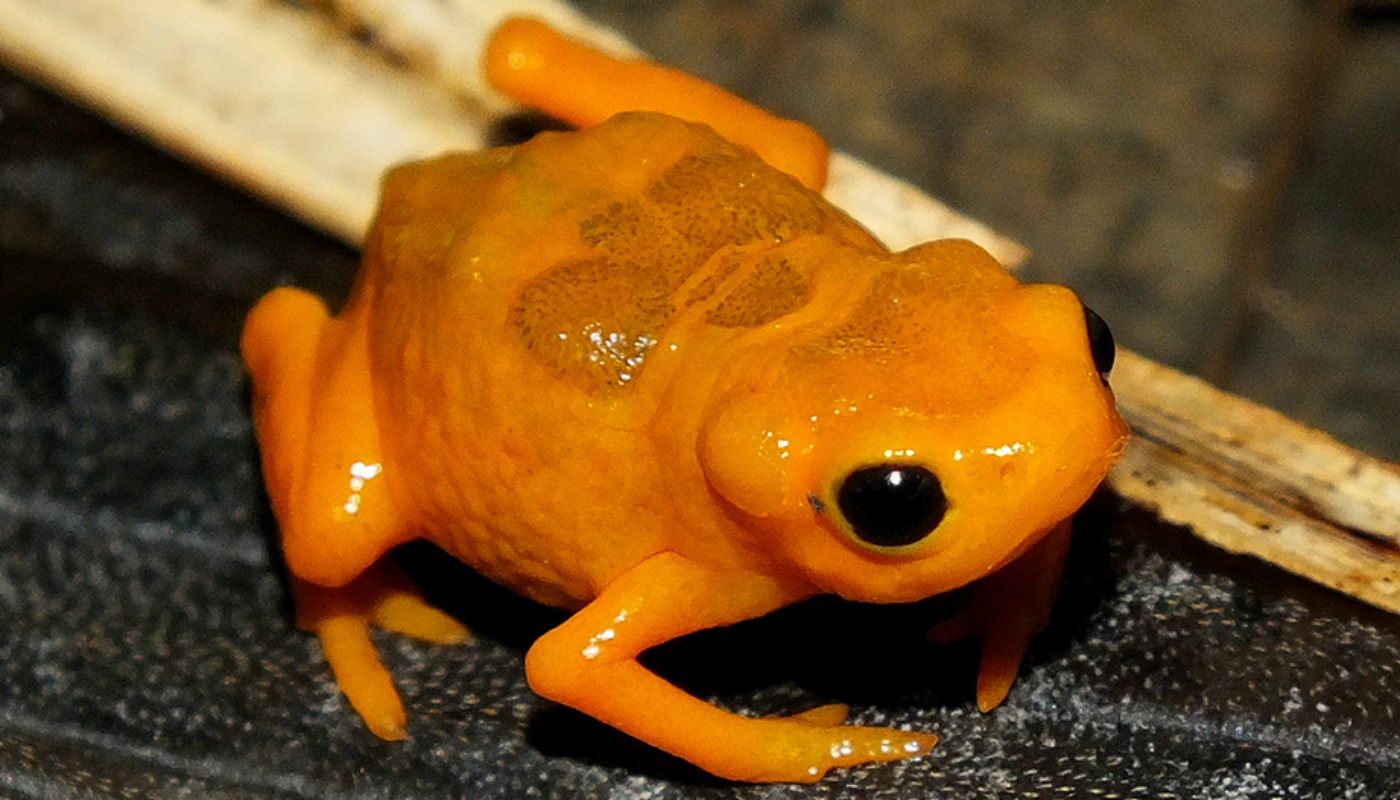
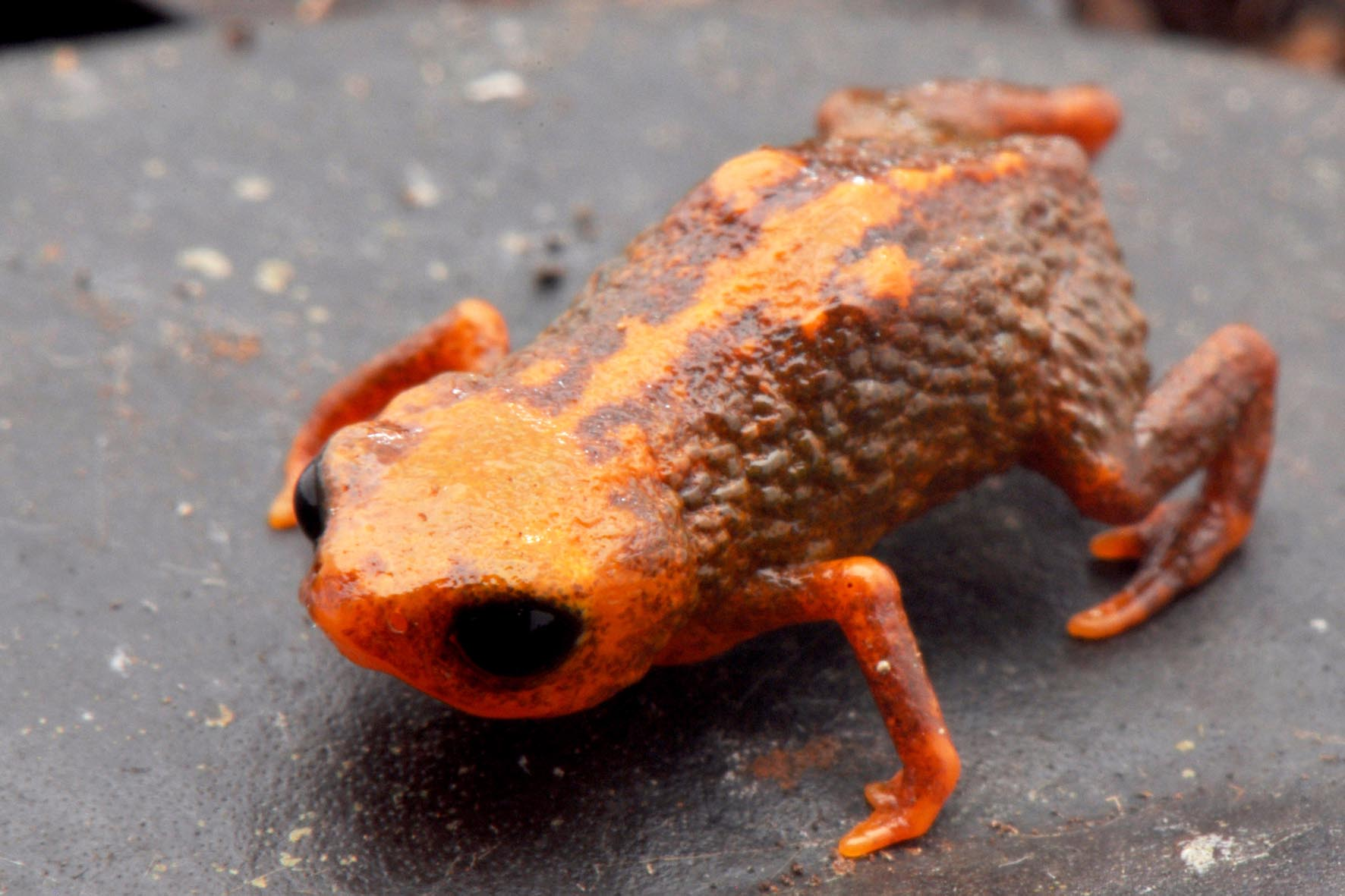
B. darkside (left) and B. quiririensis (right), two recently described species that, according to a review in 2019, are critically endangered

Only 11 species of saddleback toads have been officially rated by the IUCN, all between 2004 and 2010, with 3 species listed as least concern (not threatened) and the remaining data deficient (insufficient data for rating them). Since then, many new species have been recognised and more data has become available for evaluating their conservation status. In a review in 2019 that included all species recognised up until then and used IUCN's definitions, 10 species were data deficient, 5 least concern, 10 vulnerable, 5 endangered and 6 critically endangered. Two of the data deficient species, B. atelopoide and B. bufonoides, have not been recorded since their original scientific descriptions a century ago and they are unknown in life.

The three flea frogs B. didactylus, B. hermogenesi and B. sulfuratus and the pumpkin toadlet B. ephippiumsi are relatively widespread in both distribution and altitude range (lowlands to about 1,100–1,250 m [3,610–4,100 ft]), although it is possible that the last of these actually is a species complex. Each of the remaining species of Brachycephalus are only known from seven or less locations and many at only one or two locations covering less than 1 km^{2} (0.4 mi^{2}) at a very narrow altitude range. These are typically in cloud forest on sky island mountaintops and most species have completely separate distribution, isolated from each other by valleys and unsuitable habitat. Where found, they can however be common, sometimes even abundant. Although some of the range-restricted species have well-protected distributions in reserves, many of the species do not. Their small distributions make them highly vulnerable to habitat loss and degradation from climate change (changing temperature and rain patterns), fire, grazing by livestock, and deforestation for tree extraction and to make room for plantations, farming and cattle ranching. Some Brachycephalus species have also been found to be afflicted by recurrent outbreaks of Batrachochytrium dendrobatidis despite the fungus largely affecting aquatic frogs; these outbreaks have been linked to dry years where low water availability poses a physiological stress on frogs and also forces them to retreat to refugia where they are at a high population density.
