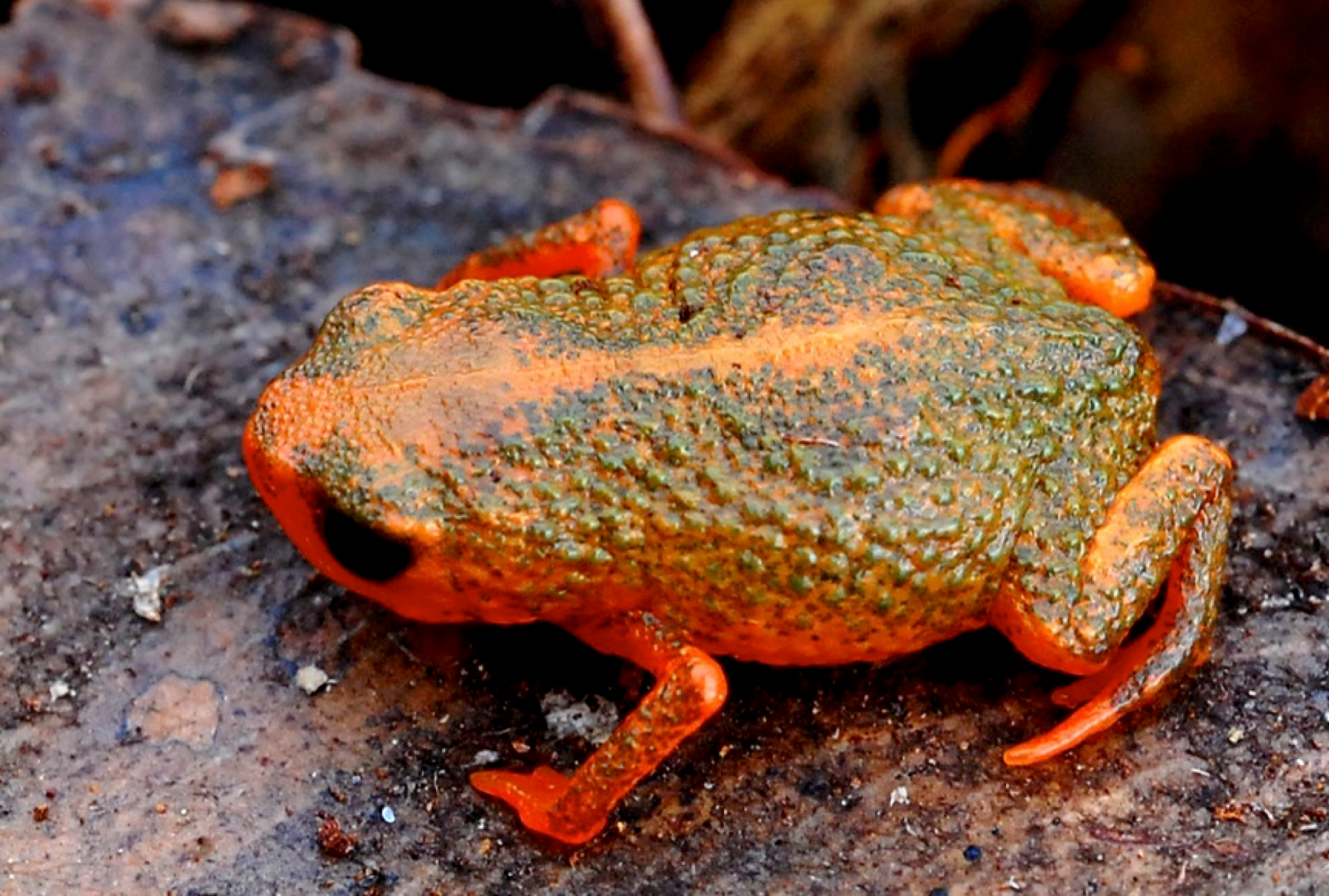

Scientific classification
- Kingdom: Animalia
- Phylum: Chordata
- Class: Amphibia
- Order: Anura
- Family: Brachycephalidae
- Genus: Brachycephalus
- Species: B. verrucosus

Binomial name
- Brachycephalus verrucosus Ribeiro et al., 2015

= Brachycephalus verrucosus =

Species of amphibian

Brachycephalus verrucosus is a species of frogs in the family Brachycephalidae. It is very tiny and was one of seven new species described by LF Ribeiro and a team of scientists from the Mater Natura - Instituto de Estudos Ambientais in Brazil. Like all species in its genus, it is found in a very small strip of Atlantic Forest in the southeastern coast of the country, and has a vibrant colour pattern. The speciation seen in this genus is thought to be a byproduct of the rift between the valley versus mountain terrain and its particular microclimates, to which they are adapted. It might be in population decline due to habitat loss. Its name is derived from the Latin verrucosus, "warty" or "rugged", alluding to the frogs highly rugose dorsum.

== Description ==
This species is distinguished from its cogenerates by having a robust and bufoniform body, the adult body measuring on average between 9.6 to 13.2 millimetres (0.38 to 0.52 in); its very rough dorsum; and its general coloration of the dorsum being light-green with a thin orange stripe along the majority of its vertebral column. The skin on its dorsum shows no dermal co-ossification. Being a representative of the pernix group, it is most similar to B. olivaceus due to their green coloration, yet the orange coloration of this species' belly differs from the yellow and green coloration found in the belly of B. olivaceus. The species dorsal coloration is a lighter colour overall due to the alternation of small yellow and green spots throughout.

== Distribution ==
Brachycephalus verrucosus is only known from its type locality, which is Morro da Tromba in the State of Santa Catarina, at 900 metres (3,000 ft) above sea level.
