= Firmisternal =

Firmisternal denotes a morphology of the pectoral girdle of frogs. In firmisternal girdles, the epicoracoid cartilages are fused anteriorly and posteriorly, and usually have an omosternum present. This is in contrast to the other predominant morphology, an arciferal girdle. Firmisternal morphology is generally considered a unique trait of the broad clade "Ranoidea", including Ranidae, Rhacophoridae and other families.
