= Arciferal =

Morphology of the frog

Arciferal denotes a morphology of the pectoral girdle of frogs. In arciferal girdles, the epicoracoid cartilages are fused anteriorly, but are separate and overlapping posteriorly. This is in contrast to the other predominant morphology, firmisternal girdle. Arciferal morphology is generally considered primitive for anurans.
