= Brachycephalus ferruginus =

Conservation status
- Data Deficient (IUCN 3.1)

Scientific classification
- Kingdom: Animalia
- Phylum: Chordata
- Class: Amphibia
- Order: Anura
- Family: Brachycephalidae
- Genus: Brachycephalus
- Species: B. ferruginus

Binomial name
- Brachycephalus ferruginus Alves, Ribeiro, Haddad, and Reis, 2006
- Range in Brazil

Species of amphibian

Brachycephalus ferruginus is a species of frogs in the family Brachycephalidae. It is endemic to southern Brazil and only known from its type locality, Pico Marumbi, in the Serra do Mar in Morretes, Paraná state. Its altitudinal range is 965–1,470 m (3,166–4,823 ft) above sea level.

== Etymology ==
The specific name ferruginus is a Latin noun and means "rust" or "reddish-brown". This alludes to the dorsal reddish-brown markings of this species.

== Description ==
As all brachycephalids, Brachycephalus ferruginus are small: adult males measure 11.6–12.5 mm (0.46–0.49 in) and females 13.0–14.5 mm (0.51–0.57 in) in snout–vent length; this miniaturization is associated with loss of phalanges in hands and feet. The body is robust and toad-like. There is no tympanum. The general color is orange. There are irregular reddish-brown markings above; the underside has small dark brown spots, and the belly has small brownish spots and dots. The skin on top of the head and central part of the back body is smooth and without dermal co-ossification, whereas skin on the dorso-lateral surfaces of body, flanks, and dorsal surface of thighs is granular.

A dissected female was found to contain three eggs. Eggs are probably terrestrial with direct development (i.e., there is no free-living larval stage), as in B. ephippium.

== Habitat and conservation ==
Brachycephalus ferruginus inhabit the leaf litter in the Atlantic Rainforest. They are active by day; males are exposed on the litter when calling. The species can be locally abundant. There are no known threats to this species, but it is only known from a single location. Its conservation status was last reviewed by the IUCN in 2008 where regarded as data deficient (insufficient information for rating it), but an independent review in 2019 using IUCN's criteria recommended that B. ferruginus should be considered "least concern" (not threatened).
