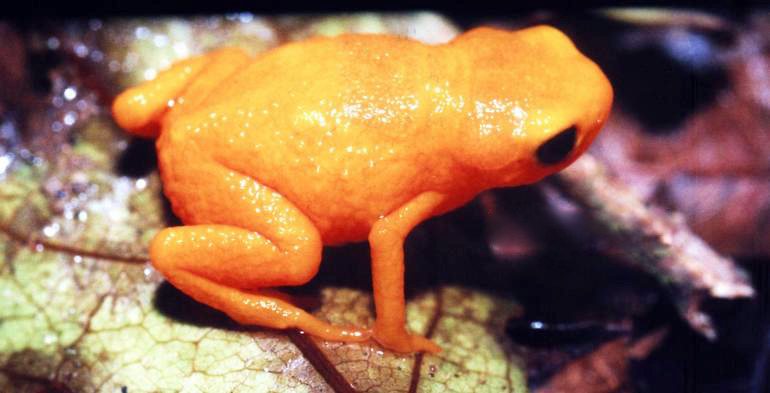

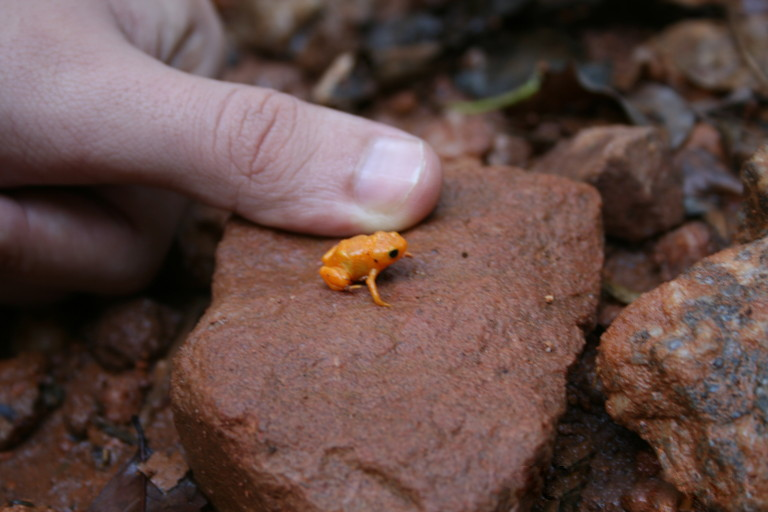
- Close-up (above), size compared to a human thumb (below)

Conservation status
- Least Concern (IUCN 3.1)

Scientific classification
- Kingdom: Animalia
- Phylum: Chordata
- Class: Amphibia
- Order: Anura
- Family: Brachycephalidae
- Genus: Brachycephalus
- Species: B. ephippium

Binomial name
- Brachycephalus ephippium (Spix, 1824)

= Pumpkin toadlet =

Species of amphibian

The pumpkin toadlet (Brachycephalus ephippium), or Spix's saddleback toad, is a small and brightly coloured species of frog in the family Brachycephalidae. This diurnal species is endemic to southeastern Brazil where it is found among leaf litter on the floor of Atlantic rainforests at an altitude of 200–1,250 m (660–4,100 ft). It is found in Espírito Santo, Rio de Janeiro, southeastern São Paulo and southeastern Minas Gerais. Although its type specimen supposedly was collected in Bahia about 200 years ago, there are no confirmed localities in this state and recent reviews consider it more likely that it was from Rio de Janeiro. B. ephippium is locally common, quite widespread compared to most other species of Brachycephalus and it is not considered threatened.

B. ephippium feeds on tiny invertebrates and breeds by direct development, with the female laying a few eggs on land that hatch into young toadlets (no tadpole stage).

== Appearance and toxicity ==
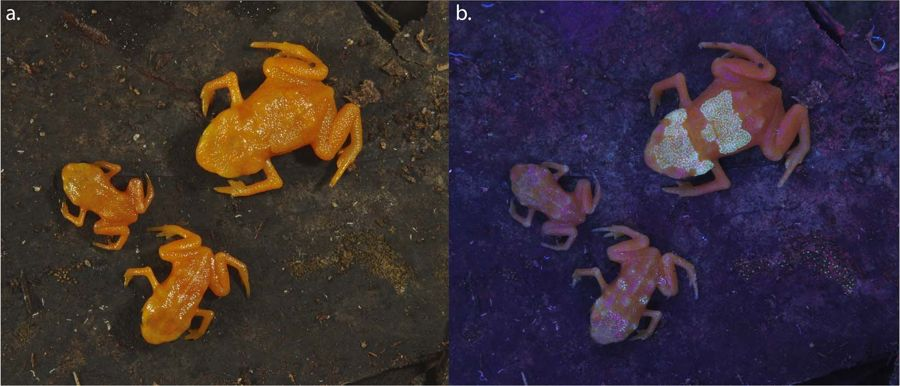
An adult and two young under normal light (left) and UV light (right), showing that fluorescence varies with age

Fluorescent patterns on the back of a pumpkin toadlet under ultraviolet light

B. ephippium is a very small frog with a snout–to–vent length of 12.5–19.7 mm (0.49–0.78 in) in adults, but it is among the largest in its genus together with species such as B. ferruginus and B. garbeanus. Females tend to be larger than males. Newly hatched B. ephippium typically measure just 5.25–5.45 mm (0.207–0.215 in).

While newly hatched B. ephippium are well-camouflaged and brown, adult B. ephippium are bright yellow-orange, which is considered aposematism (a display of warning colours), warning potential predators of its toxicity, like 11-oxotetrodotoxin (11-oxoTTX). Along with being extremely rare in other animals, even marine species, 11-oxotetrodotoxin is considered four to five times more potent than tetrodotoxin itself. Other analogues isolated from this species include tetrodonic acid, 4-epipetrodotoxin, 4.9-anhydrotetrodotoxin and 11-nortetrodotoxin. The toxins can be found in their skin and ovaries, but are mostly concentrated in the liver.

In 2019, scientists discovered that the head and back of this toadlet and the closely related red pumpkin toadlet (B. pitanga) glowed under ultraviolet light, due to their fluorescent skeletons. Juveniles that have gained the bright yellow-orange adult colours still lack fluorescence. It was initially speculated that the fluorescent colour also is aposematic or that it is related to mate choice (species recognition or determining fitness of a potential partner), but later studies indicate that the former explanation is unlikely, as predation attempts on the toadlets appear to be unaffected by either presence or absence of fluorescence.

== Call and hearing ==
Peculiarly, this species and the red pumpkin toadlet are unable to hear the frequency of their own advertising calls, as their ears are underdeveloped. Instead their communication appears to rely on certain movements like the vocal sac that inflates when calling, mouth gaping and waving of their arms. It is speculated that their calling is a vestigiality from the ancestral form of the genus, whereas their reduced hearing ability (they do have some hearing ability in frequencies outside their call) is a novel change in these species. Sounds make them more vulnerable to predators, but there has likely been little direct evolutionary pressure to lose it because of their toxicity.

== See also ==
- Polka-dot tree frog (Hypsiboas punctatus) — the first frog discovered to be fluorescent, in 2017
