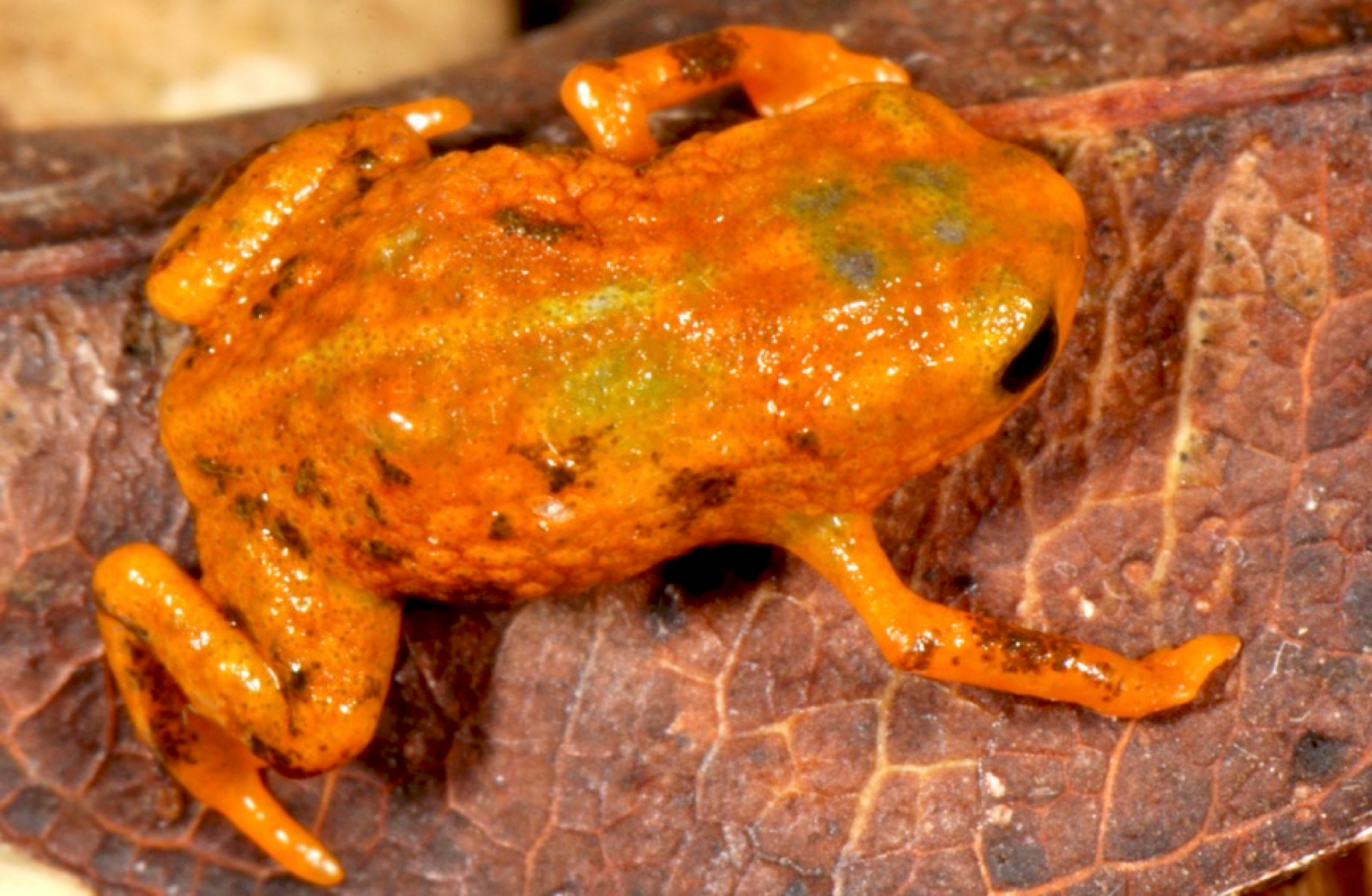

Scientific classification
- Kingdom: Animalia
- Phylum: Chordata
- Class: Amphibia
- Order: Anura
- Family: Brachycephalidae
- Genus: Brachycephalus
- Species: B. mariaeterezae

Binomial name
- Brachycephalus mariaeterezae Ribeiro et al., 2015

= Brachycephalus mariaeterezae =

Species of frog

Brachycephalus mariaeterezae is a species of frog in the family Brachycephalidae. It is very tiny and was one of seven new species described by LF Ribeiro and a team of scientists from the Mater Natura - Instituto de Estudos Ambientais in Brazil. Like all species in its genus, it is found in a very small strip of Atlantic Forest in the southeastern coast of the country, and has a vibrant colour pattern. The speciation seen in this genus is thought to be a byproduct of the rift between the valley versus mountain terrain and its particular microclimates, to which they are adapted. It might be in population decline due to habitat loss. Its name honours Maria Tereza Jorge Pádua, a Brazilian environmentalist.

== Description ==
It is distinguished from its cogenerate species by having a robust body, bufoniform, its adult length measuring between 10.4 to 13.4 millimetres (0.41 to 0.53 in), and a rough dorsum. It has a yellowish background colour, and possesses small brown spots, particularly on the sides of the body and belly and a prominent irregular light-blue stripe on the dorsum of the head and its body (all along the back); it also has small dark spots distributed irregularly throughout its arms and legs; the skin on its dorsum shows no dermal co-ossification.

== Distribution ==
The species is known only from its type locality, specifically at the Reserva Particular do Patrimônio Natural Caetezal, located in the top of the Serra Queimada, State of Santa Catarina.
