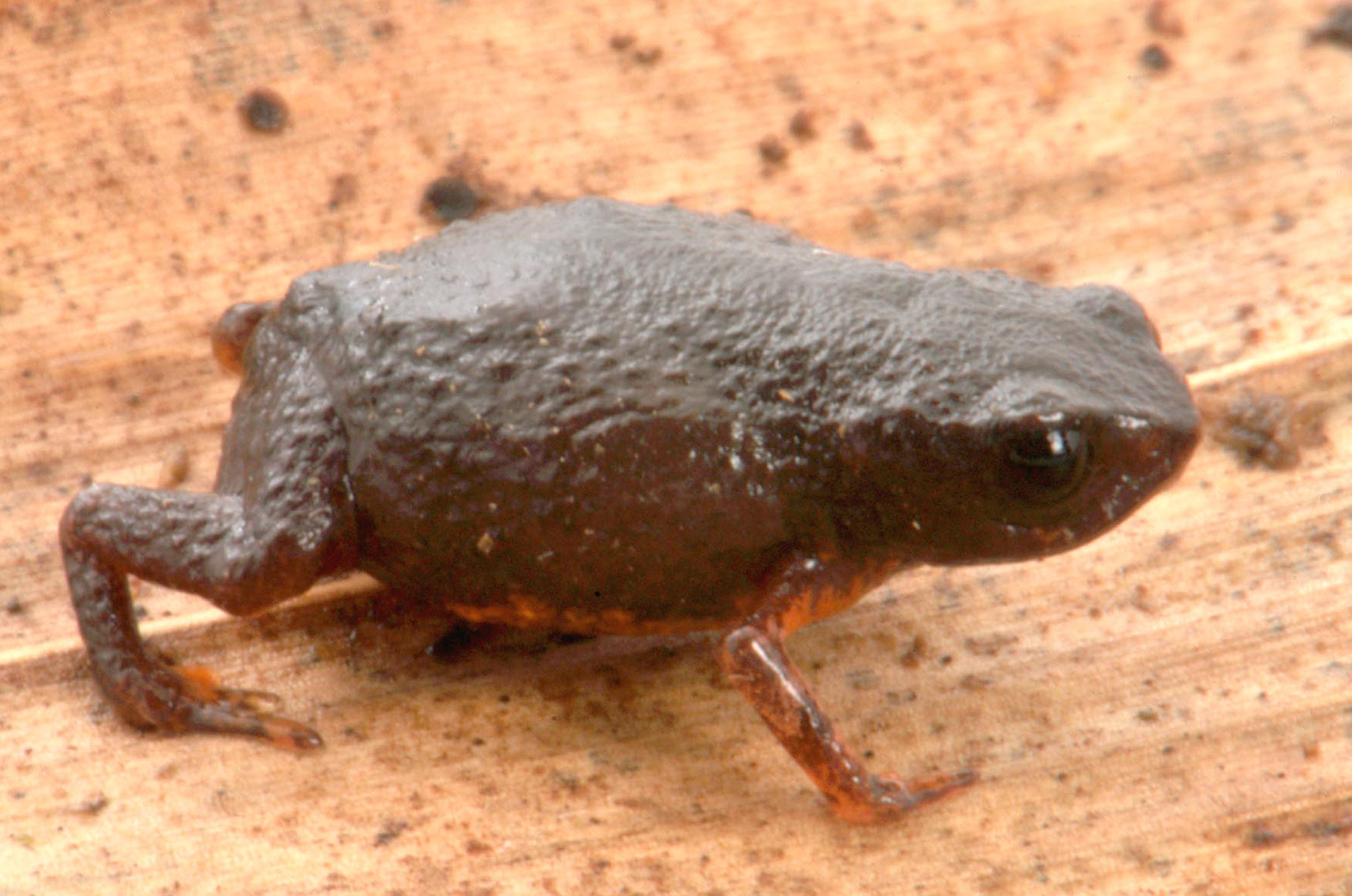

Conservation status
- Data Deficient (IUCN 3.1)

Scientific classification
- Kingdom: Animalia
- Phylum: Chordata
- Class: Amphibia
- Order: Anura
- Family: Brachycephalidae
- Genus: Brachycephalus
- Species: B. brunneus

Binomial name
- Brachycephalus brunneus Ribeiro, Alves, Haddad & Dos Reis, 2005

= Brachycephalus brunneus =

Species of frog

Brachycephalus brunneus is a species of frog in the family Brachycephalidae. It is endemic to Brazil and known only from Pico Caratuva, Campina Grande do Sul, Paraná. It is found in thick leaf-litter in Atlantic forest and is diurnal, active especially from December to February. Its natural habitat is subtropical or tropical moist montane forests. It is threatened by habitat loss for cattle pasture and agriculture such as sugar cane, coffee, and exotic trees.
