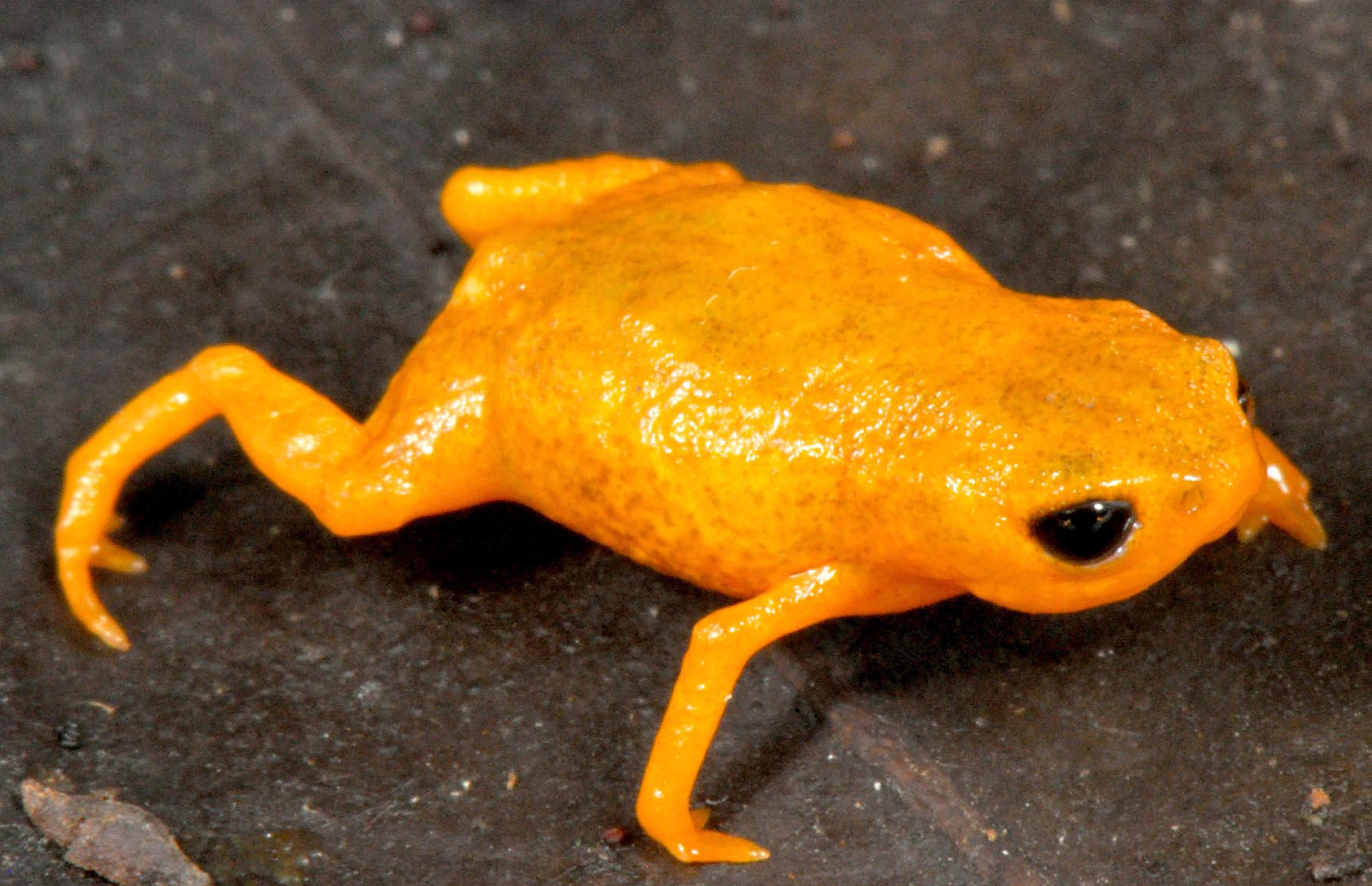

Conservation status
- Data Deficient (IUCN 3.1)

Scientific classification
- Kingdom: Animalia
- Phylum: Chordata
- Class: Amphibia
- Order: Anura
- Clade: Brachycephaloidea
- Family: Brachycephalidae
- Genus: Brachycephalus
- Species: B. izecksohni

Binomial name
- Brachycephalus izecksohni Ribeiro, Alves, Haddad & Dos Reis, 2005

= Brachycephalus izecksohni =

Species of frog

Brachycephalus izecksohni is a species of frog in the family Brachycephalidae endemic to Brazil. Its natural habitat is subtropical or tropical moist montanes in the areas of Pico Torre da Prata, between the districts of Guaratuba and Paranaguá in Paraná, Brazil. Named for Brazilian herpetologist Eugenio Izecksohn, it is found in leaf-litter and is diurnal.

It is threatened by habitat loss for logging, cattle pasture and agriculture such as sugar cane, coffee, and exotic trees.
