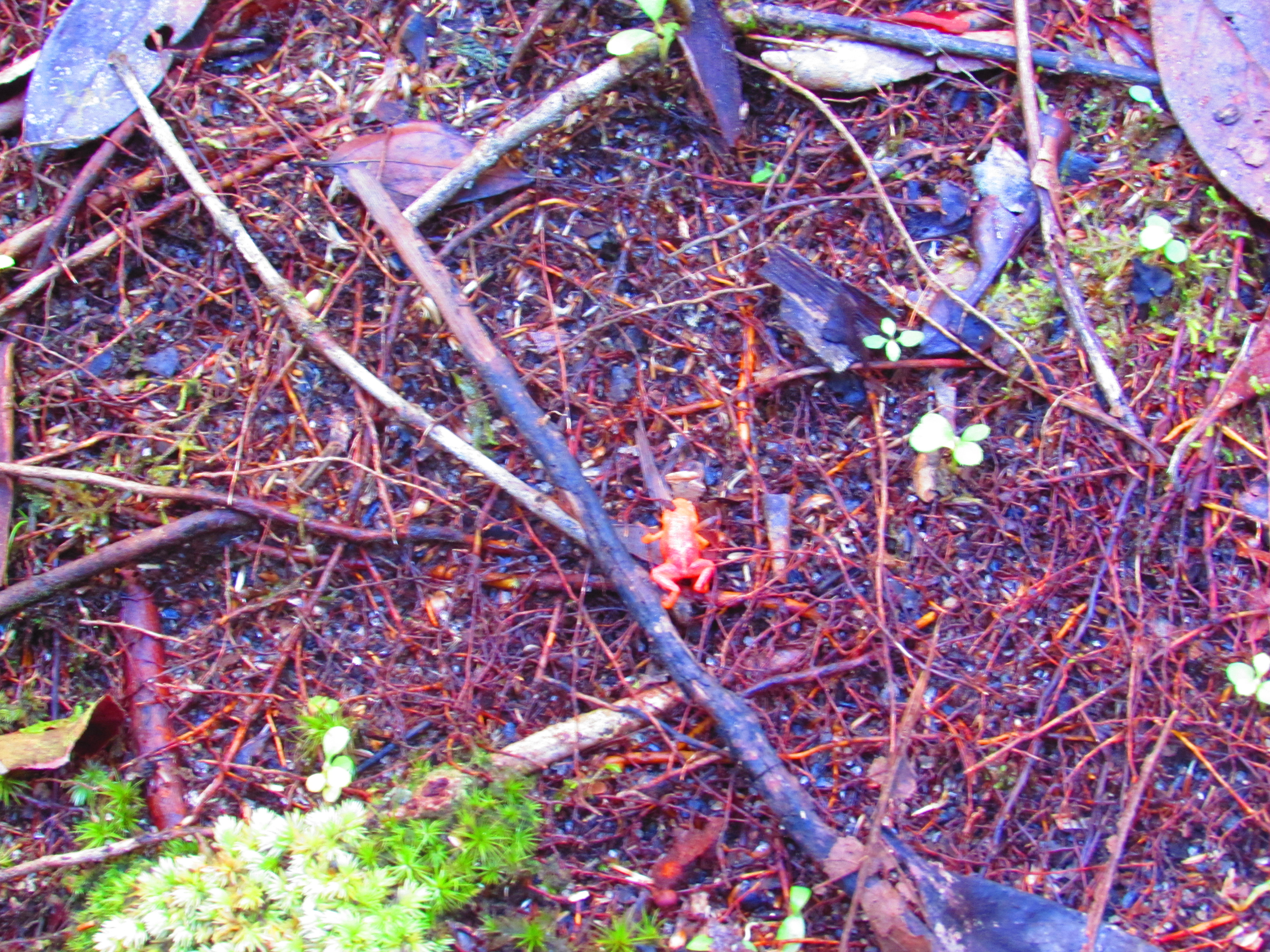

Conservation status
- Data Deficient (IUCN 3.1)

Scientific classification
- Kingdom: Animalia
- Phylum: Chordata
- Class: Amphibia
- Order: Anura
- Clade: Brachycephaloidea
- Family: Brachycephalidae
- Genus: Brachycephalus
- Species: B. pernix

Binomial name
- Brachycephalus pernix Pombal, Wistuba & Bornschein, 1998

= Brachycephalus pernix =

Species of amphibian

Brachycephalus pernix is a small and brightly coloured species of frog in the family Brachycephalidae. It is endemic to Paraná in southeastern Brazil and only known from a single location at an altitude of 1,135–1,405 m (3,724–4,610 ft) on Serra da Baitaca in Serra da Baitaca State Park. This diurnal species lives among leaf litter on the floor of Atlantic rainforest.

Its conservation status was last reviewed by the IUCN in 2004 where regarded as data deficient (insufficient information for rating it), but an independent review in 2019 that used IUCN's criteria recommended that B. pernix should be recognised as vulnerable.

== Appearance and toxicity ==
Although very small with a snout–to–vent length of 12–13.3 mm (0.47–0.52 in) in adult males and 14.1–15.8 mm (0.56–0.62 in) in adult females, B. pernix is a medium-large species of Brachycephalus. It is overall bright orange with a variable amount of black mottling or spotting above, ranging from little in some individuals (largely orange above) to much in others (extensively black above with pure orange essentially restricted to top of head and mid-back). The bright pattern is considered aposematic (warning colours) since its skin and organs contain tetrodotoxin and similar toxins.
