= Brachycephalus nanicus =

Scientific classification
- Kingdom: Animalia
- Phylum: Chordata
- Class: Amphibia
- Order: Anura
- Clade: Brachycephaloidea
- Family: Brachycephalidae
- Genus: Brachycephalus
- Species: B. nanicus

Binomial name
- Brachycephalus nanicus Nunes et al., 2025

Species of tiny frogs

Brachycephalus nanicus is a species of small frog in the family Brachycephalidae endemic to the Atlantic Forest of Brazil. It is one of more than 40 named species within the genus Brachycephalus, and is most closely related to Brachycephalus puri. B. nanicus is a very small species; adult males range from 6.9–9.0 millimetres (0.27–0.35 in) (SVL), while females are slightly larger, at 9.2–9.6 mm (0.36–0.38 in). It is characterized as a "flea-toad", having a more slender body and more dull coloration than the rounder and brighter "pumpkin toadlet" members of the genus. It has smooth skin, a rounded snout when seen from above, a lacking first toe, and a brown coloration with scattered golden spots and a dark stripe running down the side and thigh.

== Taxonomy ==
Brachycephalus, along with Ischnocnema, comprise the family Brachycephalidae, which is a member of the larger clade Brachycephaloidea. Brachycephaloids are uniquely characterized by undergoing direct development, meaning individuals hatch from eggs as tiny versions of the adult, rather than tadpoles. The placement of Brachycephalus within this clade is shown in the cladogram below:

- Brachycephaloidea
  - Ceuthomantidae
  - - Neblinaphrynidae
    - - - Craugastoridae
        - Strabomantidae
      - - Eleutherodactylidae
        - - Caligophrynidae
          - Brachycephalidae
            - Ischnocnema
            - Brachycephalus

More than 40 species of Brachycephalus are recognized, generally divided into two major subcategories, both of which are polyphyletic groups: the more speciose "pumpkin toadlets", characterized by their brighter colors (red, orange, yellow, and green patterns) and bufoniform (more stout) body blan, and the less diverse "flea-toads", characterized by their dull colors and leptodactyliform (more slender) body plan. B. nanicus is one of the seven named flea-toads (B. clarissae exhibiting an intermediate anatomy between the two groupings). In their 2025 description of B. nanicus, Nunes and colleagues tested the phylogenetic relationships of Brachycephalus species, recovering B. nanicus as the sister taxon to B. puri. The results from their analysis are displayed in the cladogram below, with flea-toads noted indicated. ⊞ buttons can be clicked to expand nodes.

- Brachycephalus
  - Brachycephalus pulex
  - - - B. puri species group
        - Brachycephalus puri
        - - Brachycephalus sp. 8
          - Brachycephalus nanicus
      - - Brachycephalus didactylus
        - - Brachycephalus clarissae
          - - B. ephippium species group
              ⊞
              - Brachycephalus garbeanus
              - - Brachycephalus ephippium
                - - Brachycephalus ibitinga
                  - - - Brachycephalus darkside
                      - Brachycephalus rotenbergae
                    - - Brachycephalus sp. 6
                      - Brachycephalus margaritatus
              ⊟
            - B. vertebralis species group
              ⊞
              - - Brachycephalus bufonoides
                - Brachycephalus herculeus
              - - Brachycephalus alipioi
                - - - Brachycephalus toby
                    - Brachycephalus nodoterga
                  - - Brachycephalus vertebralis
                    - - Brachycephalus crispus
                      - - Brachycephalus pitanga
                        - - Brachycephalus guarani
                          - - Brachycephalus pitanga
                            - Brachycephalus sp. 3
              ⊟
    - - - Brachycephalus dacnis
        - Brachycephalus hermogenesi
      - - Brachycephalus sulfuratus
        - B. pernix species group
          ⊞
          - - Brachycephalus tridactylus
            - - Brachycephalus brunneus
              - - Brachycephalus leopardus
                - - Brachycephalus curupira
                  - Brachycephalus izecksohni
          - - - Brachycephalus boticario
              - - Brachycephalus albolineatus
                - - Brachycephalus mirissimus
                  - Brachycephalus fuscolineatus
            - - Brachycephalus actaeus
              - - - Brachycephalus quiririensis
                  - Brachycephalus verrucosus
                - - - Brachycephalus tabuleiro
                    - - Brachycephalus sp. 9
                      - - Brachycephalus mariaeterezae
                        - Brachycephalus olivaceus
                  - - Brachycephalus auroguttatus
                    - - Brachycephalus pombali
                      - - Brachycephalus ferruginus
                        - - Brachycephalus coloratus
                          - Brachycephalus pernix
          ⊟

flea-toads
