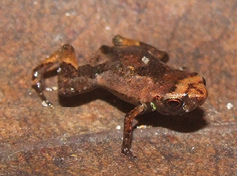

Conservation status
- Endangered (IUCN 3.1)

Scientific classification
- Kingdom: Animalia
- Phylum: Chordata
- Class: Amphibia
- Order: Anura
- Clade: Brachycephaloidea
- Family: Brachycephalidae
- Genus: Brachycephalus
- Species: B. pulex

Binomial name
- Brachycephalus pulex Napoli, Caramaschi, Cruz & Dias, 2011
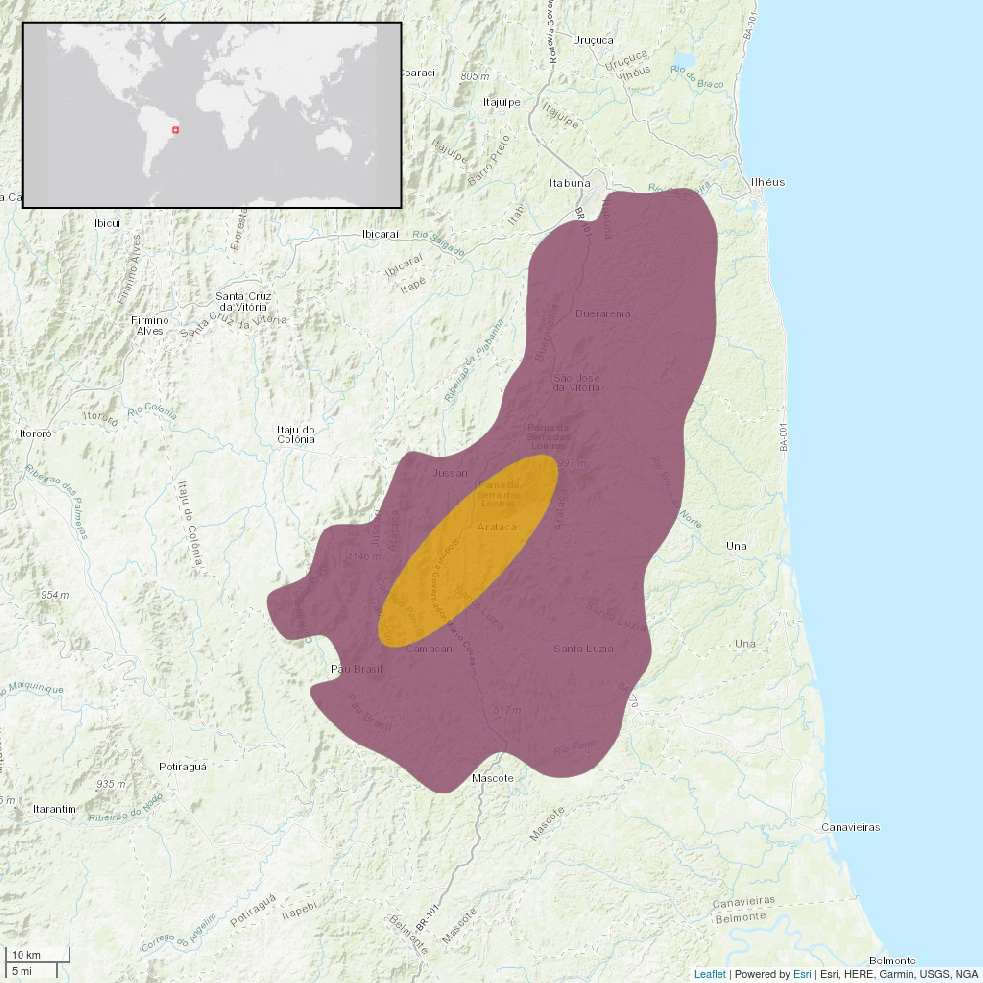
- Geographic distribution of Brachycephalus pulex

= Brachycephalus pulex =

Species of tiny frogs

Brachycephalus pulex, also known as the Brazilian flea toad and the Serra Bonita flea toad, is a species of small frog in the family Brachycephalidae. It is one of more than 40 named species within the genus Brachycephalus. B. pulex is the smallest known vertebrate, with an average length of 7.10 millimetres (0.280 in) in mature males.

== Discovery ==
The first Brachycephalus pulex specimens were found between December 2009 and July 2010 in the Serra Bonita mountain range in the Camacan and Pau Brasil municipalities of Bahia, Brazil. In January 2011, Marcelo Felgueiras Napoli, Ulisses Caramaschi, Carlos Alberto Gonçalves da Cruz & Iuri Ribeiro Dias described Brachycephalus pulex as a new species of Brachycephalus based on these specimens. The holotype specimen, MNRJ 69646, is an adult individual. Many other specimens, including juveniles, sub-adults, and adults, were collected and assigned as paratopotypes (paratype specimens found in the holotype locality).

=== Etymology ===
The specific name, "pulex", is also the generic name of the flea, Pulex irritans. This references the tiny size of the species and the comparable ability to jump well. It is also fitting since certain species of Brachycephalus are also known as "flea-toads". Brachycephalus pulex is also known by the common names "Brazilian flea toad" and "Serra Bonita flea toad".

== Description ==
Brachycephalus pulex—along with other related flea-toads—has a leptodactyliform body shape, with a slender pectoral girdle and body, well-developed hind limbs, and a long, narrow head and snout. This is in contrast to the bufoniform body plan of the pumpkin toadlets within the genus Brachycephalus, which have poorly-developed hind limbs and wider heads. Because of its developed hind limbs, Brachycephalus pulex is capable of long-distance jumping. Its describers noted this behavior when observing individuals in natura, when one specimen feigned death after jumping several times and landing on a leaf. Bufoniform pumpkin toadlets, however, have very poor jumping ability.

The skeletal structure of Brachycephalus pulex is nonhyperossified, meaning that the skull bones and spinal processes of the sacral and presacral vertebral lack sculpturing.

=== Size ===
The miniature size of Brachycephalus pulex is notable; one adult specimen had a snout–vent length of 6.45 millimetres (0.254 in). This makes B. pulex the smallest known vertebrate. Mature males exhibit an average length of 7.10 millimetres (0.280 in), while females are consistently slightly larger, with an average length of 8.15 millimetres (0.321 in). The second smallest vertebrate is also a species in the Brachycephalus genus, B. dacnis, with a minimum length of 6.95 millimetres (0.274 in).

== Distribution and conservation ==
Brachycephalus pulex has only been found in the type locality. It lives in mountainous evergreen subtropical to tropical moist montane forests in the Atlantic Forest biome, ranging from an elevation of 220–930 metres (720–3,050 ft) above sea level. In can most easily be found inhabiting dense leaf litter in areas with epiphytic bromeliads.

There is a low abundance of this species, and populations are decreasing in numbers due to habitat loss. The IUCN listed urban expansion, agriculture, and livestock grazing as the leading causes for habitat loss—and thus declining populations—in this species.

== Classification ==
More than 40 species of Brachycephalus are recognized. Brachycephalus pulex is considered to be a "flea-toad", one of the two major subcategories of frogs within the genus Brachycephalus (the other being pumpkin toadlets). Pumpkin toadlets are the more speciose of the two groups, with only seven named flea-toad species, which form a paraphyletic group. Brachycephalus, along with Ischnocnema, are the two genera comprising the family Brachycephalidae. The relationships of this clade in relation to other frog families are shown in the cladogram below:

- - Rana catesbeiana
  - - - Agalychnis callidryas
      - Litoria caerulea
    - - Eleutherodactylidae
        - Phyzelaphryninae
        - Eleutherodactylinae
      - - Brachycephalidae
          - Brachycephalus
          - Ischnocnema
        - - Craugastoridae
          - Strabomantidae
            - Holoadeninae
            - Strabomantinae

In 2020, Condez, Haddad & Zamudio tested the phylogenetic relationships of Brachycephalus species. In their first analysis, fellow flea-toad Brachycephalus hermogenesi was recovered as the basalmost member of the genus, followed by B. pulex, which was the sister taxon to all other species in the genus. Their second analysis placed B. hermogenesi as the sister taxon to B. pulex, with this clade within one of two major Brachycephalus clades. Their results from this analysis are displayed in the cladogram below, including distinct, unnamed species. Flea-toads are noted in orange.

- Brachycephalus
  - Brachycephalus sp. 7
  - - - Brachycephalus didactylus
      - - - Brachycephalus sp. 1
          - - Brachycephalus sp. 2
            - - Brachycephalus alipioi
              - - - Brachycephalus nodoterga
                  - Brachycephalus toby
                - - Brachycephalus vertebralis
                  - - Brachycephalus guarani
                    - Brachycephalus pitanga
                    - Brachycephalus crispus
                    - Brachycephalus sp. 3
        - - Brachycephalus garbeanus
          - - Brachycephalus ephippium
            - - Brachycephalus sp. 4
              - - Brachycephalus sp. 5
                - - Brachycephalus margaritatus
                  - Brachycephalus sp. 6
    - - - Brachycephalus hermogenesi
        - Brachycephalus pulex
      - - Brachycephalus sp. 8
        - - Brachycephalus sulfuratus
          - - - Brachycephalus brunneus
              - Brachycephalus izecksohni
            - - Brachycephalus olivaceus
              - - Brachycephalus actaeus
                - - - Brachycephalus quiririensis
                    - Brachycephalus sp. 9
                  - - Brachycephalus pombali
                    - - Brachycephalus ferruginus
                      - Brachycephalus pernix

In contrast, dos Reis et al. (2020) also analyzed the phylogenetic relationships of Brachycephalus species, in the context of skull morphology and skeletal ossification. They recovered Brachycephalus pulex as the basalmost member of the genus, as the sister taxon to all other species.

== See also ==
- Smallest organisms
- Brachycephalus dacnis
- Paedophryne amauensis
