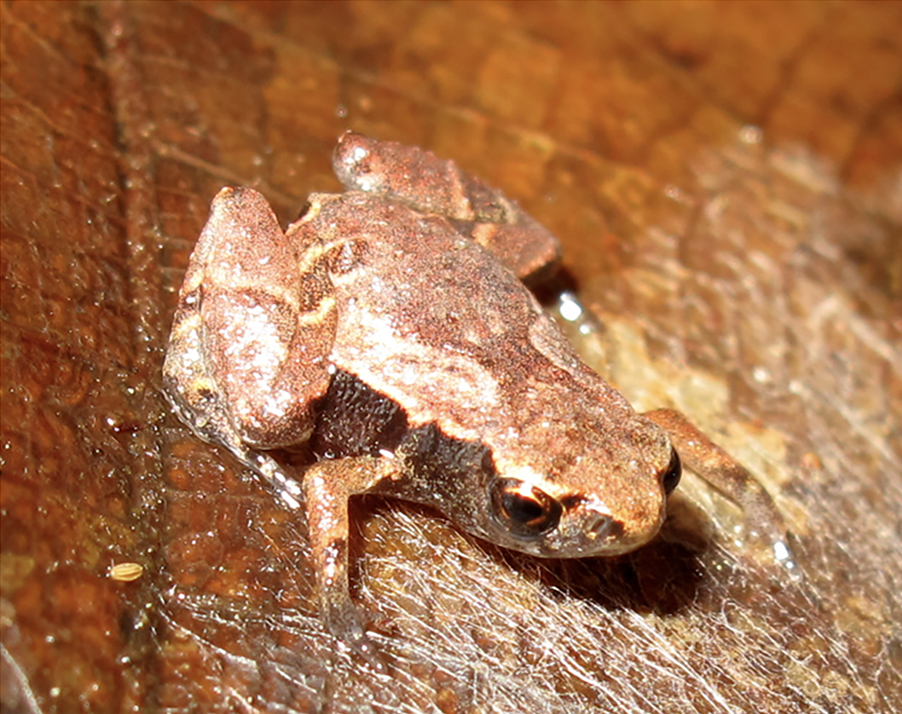

Scientific classification
- Kingdom: Animalia
- Phylum: Chordata
- Class: Amphibia
- Order: Anura
- Clade: Brachycephaloidea
- Family: Brachycephalidae
- Genus: Brachycephalus
- Species: B. dacnis

Binomial name
- Brachycephalus dacnis Toledo et al., 2024
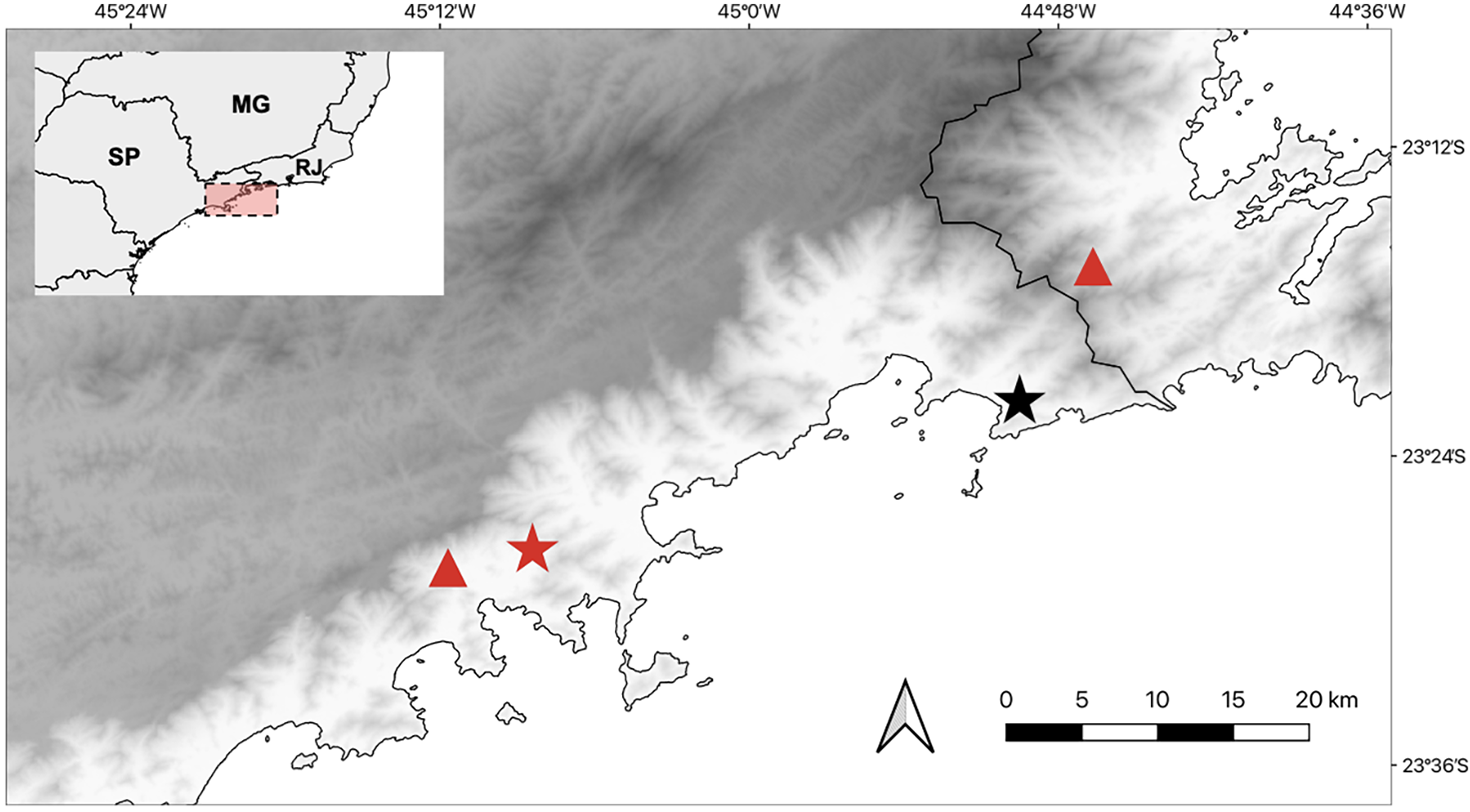
- Geographic distribution of B. dacnis (type locality [★] and other known localities [▲])

= Brachycephalus dacnis =

Species of tiny frogs

Brachycephalus dacnis is a species of small frog in the family Brachycephalidae endemic to the Atlantic Forest of Brazil. It is one of more than 40 named species within the genus Brachycephalus, and is most similar to B. hermogenesi. B. dacnis is one of the smallest known vertebrates, with the congeneric B. pulex being the only smaller species.

== Discovery ==
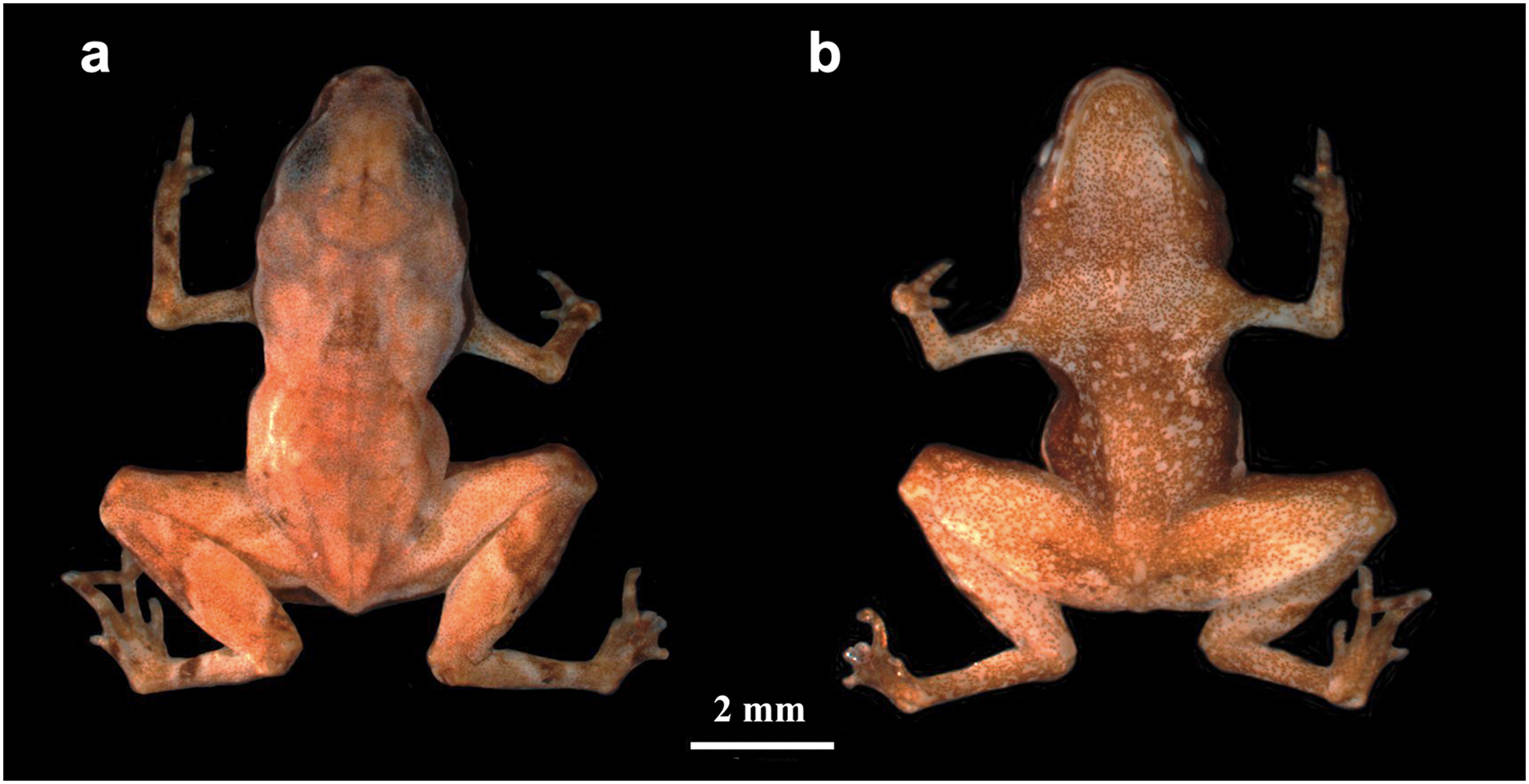
B. dacnis preserved holotype specimen

Many Brachycephalus species are cryptic species, with the only differential characters being the patterns of their advertisement calls. This was pointed out in a 2021 review by Bornschein et al. analyzing the visually similar B. sulfuratus and B. hermogenesi. Based on call recordings, they recognized these two species in addition to a third distinct taxon, which remained unnamed.

Fieldwork was subsequently performed from June 2021 to May 2022 in Atlantic Forest localities in the Projeto Dacnis private reserve in Ubatuba, São Paulo. Several new Brachycephalus specimens were collected and recorded, corresponding with the calls previously recognized as belonging to a new species. In October 2024, Luís Felipe Toledo and colleagues described Brachycephalus dacnis as a new species of Brachycephalus based on these specimens. The holotype specimen, ZUEC-AMP 24982, is an adult male collected in May 2021. Eleven other adult specimens were collected in the type locality.

=== Etymology ===
The specific name, "dacnis", honors the Projeto Dacnis reserve on which the Brachycephalus dacnis specimens were collected, and the organization's support for biodiversity research.

== Description ==
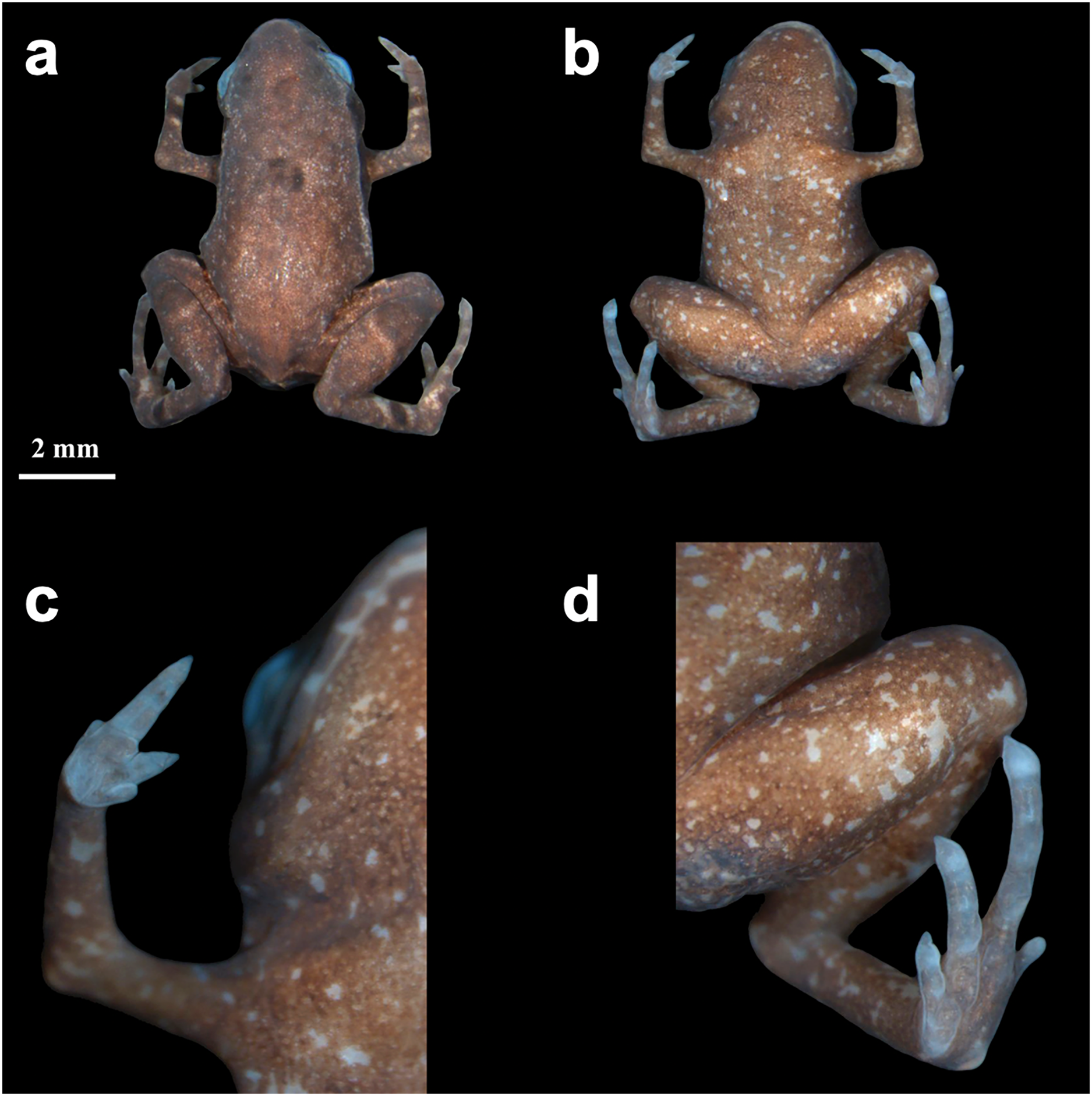
Anatomy of a B. dacnis specimen

The Brachycephalus is separated into two categories based on external appearance: the dull, cryptic-colored "flea-toads" and the more vibrant "pumpkin toadlets". B. dacnis—along with other related flea-toads—has a leptodactyliform body shape, with a slender pectoral girdle and body, well-developed hind limbs, and a long, narrow head and snout. This is in contrast to the bufoniform body plan of the pumpkin toadlets within the genus Brachycephalus, which have poorly-developed hind limbs and wider heads. Because of its developed hind limbs, Brachycephalus dacnis is capable of long-distance jumping. Its describers noted this behavior when observing individuals in natura, when one specimen jumped 21.8 centimetres (8.6 in), which is a striking 31 times its snout-vent length. In contrast, bufoniform pumpkin toadlets have very poor jumping ability.

The first and fourth fingers of B. dacnis are vestigial and rounded, while the second and third are pointed. The first toe is not externally visible, but the others (three–five) are all distinct. The skin of B. dacnis is smooth, lacking the dermal ossifications seen in some other Brachycephalus species. The dorsal coloration and patterning are variable, with most specimens exhibiting shades of striped or mottled dark brown to yellowish-brown. Some specimens have leaflike or rocklike camouflage. B. dacnis eyes feature black pupils surrounded by distinct bronze-colored irises. The vent is marked by black or light brown marbled patterns and small white blotches. In contrast to some other flea toads, B. dacnis lacks dark markings over the pectoral region.

Brachycephalus dacnis uniquely retains certain skull bones that are either fused or lost in other miniature frogs, including other larger Brachycephalus species. Its digits are also more prominent and distinct than some other miniaturized Brachycephalus species such as B. pulex, B. puri, and B. didactylus in which the outermost toes are vestigial.

=== Size ===
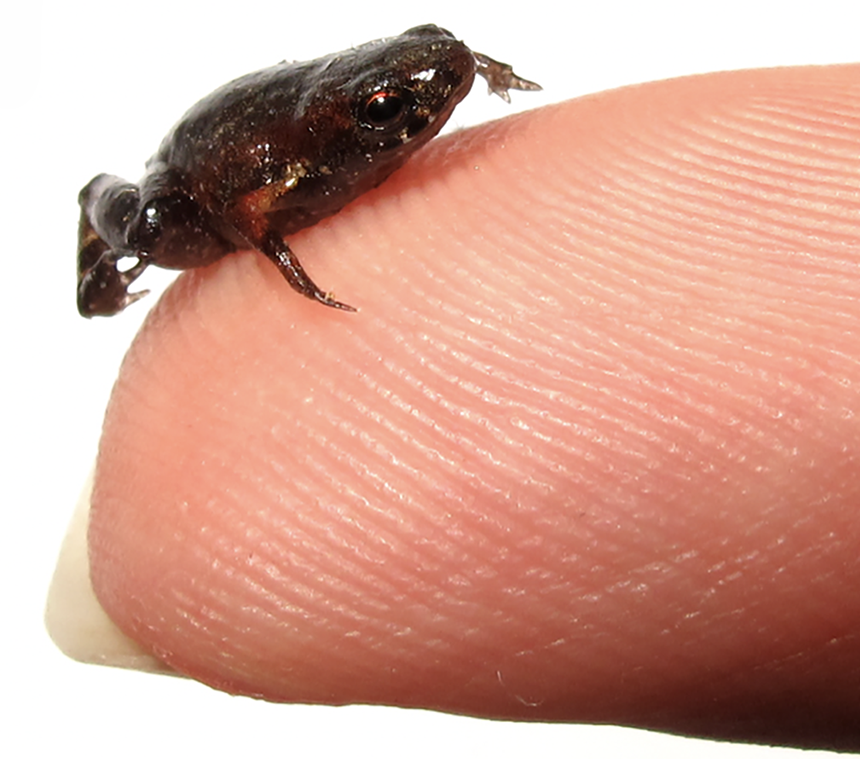
A B. dacnis individual on a human fingertip

The miniature size of Brachycephalus dacnis is notable; one adult specimen had a snout–vent length of 6.95 millimetres (0.274 in). This makes B. dacnis the second smallest known vertebrate; the only smaller taxon is B. pulex in the same genus, with a minimum length of 6.45 millimetres (0.254 in). The B. dacnis holotype is 7.55 millimetres (0.297 in) long, and the largest measured specimen is 9.90 millimetres (0.390 in) long.

== Classification ==
More than 40 species of Brachycephalus are recognized. B. dacnis is considered to be a "flea-toad", one of the two major subcategories of frogs within the genus Brachycephalus (the other being pumpkin toadlets). Pumpkin toadlets are the more speciose of the two groups, with only seven named flea-toad species, which form a polyphyletic group. Brachycephalus, along with Ischnocnema, are the two genera comprising the family Brachycephalidae. The relationships of this clade in relation to other frog families are shown in the cladogram below:

- - Rana catesbeiana
  - - - Agalychnis callidryas
      - Litoria caerulea
    - - Eleutherodactylidae
        - Phyzelaphryninae
        - Eleutherodactylinae
      - - Brachycephalidae
          - Brachycephalus
          - Ischnocnema
        - - Craugastoridae
          - Strabomantidae
            - Holoadeninae
            - Strabomantinae

In their 2024 description of B. dacnis, Toldedo et al. tested the phylogenetic relationships of Brachycephalus species. They recovered B. dacnis as the sister taxon to B. hermogensi. The results from their analyses are displayed in the cladogram below, with flea-toads noted in orange.

- Brachycephalus
  - Brachycephalus pulex
  - - - - Brachycephalus puri
        - - Brachycephalus nanicus
          - Brachycephalus sp. 8
      - - Brachycephalus didactylus
        - - Brachycephalus clarissae
          - - Brachycephalus ephippium species group
            - Brachycephalus vertebralis species group
    - - - Brachycephalus hermogenesi
        - Brachycephalus dacnis
      - - Brachycephalus sulfuratus
        - Brachycephalus pernix species group

== See also ==
- Smallest organisms
- Brachycephalus pulex
- Paedophryne amauensis
