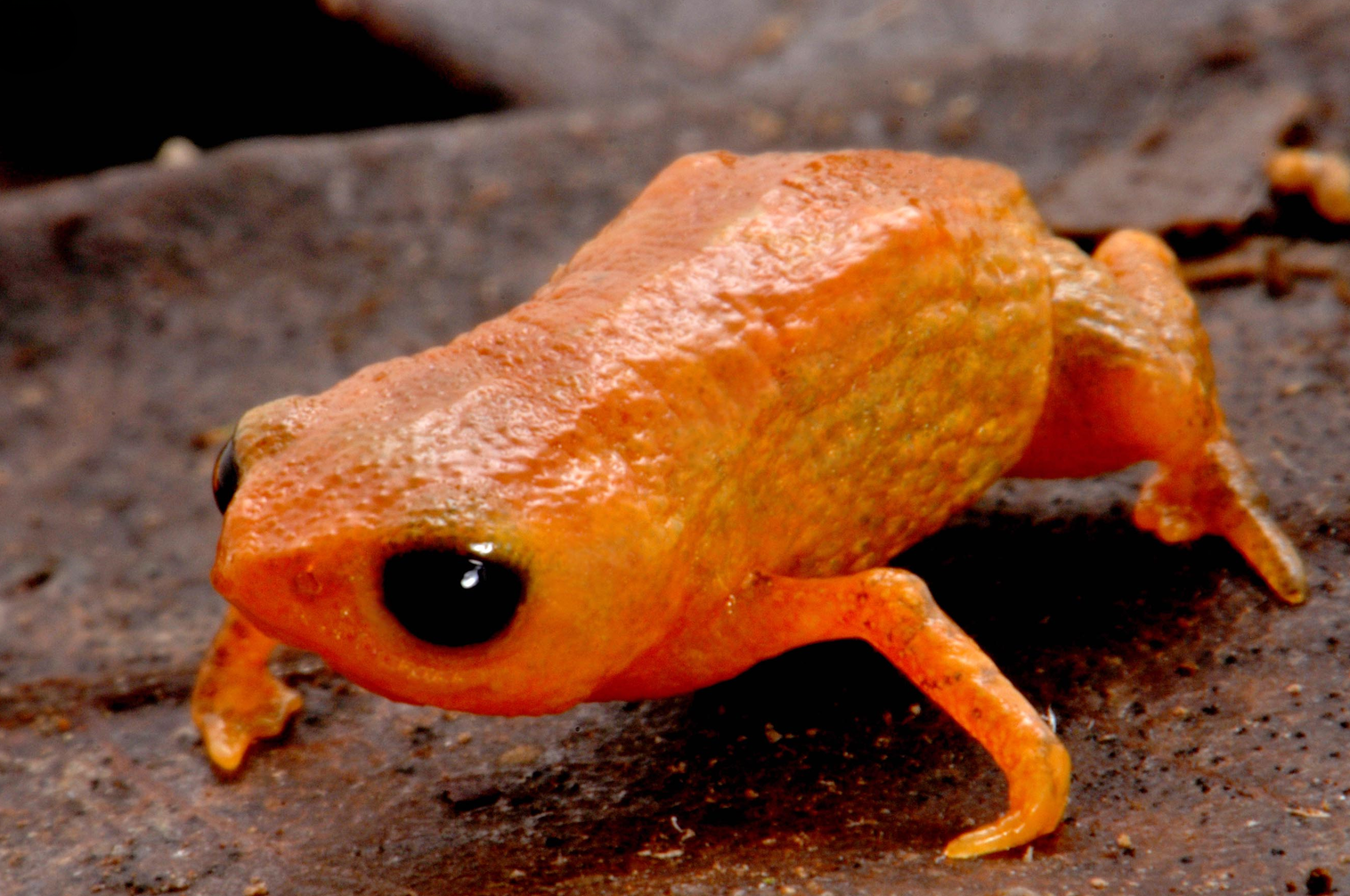
- Holotype male in life

Scientific classification
- Kingdom: Animalia
- Phylum: Chordata
- Class: Amphibia
- Order: Anura
- Clade: Brachycephaloidea
- Family: Brachycephalidae
- Genus: Brachycephalus
- Species: B. lulai

Binomial name
- Brachycephalus lulai Bornschein et al., 2025
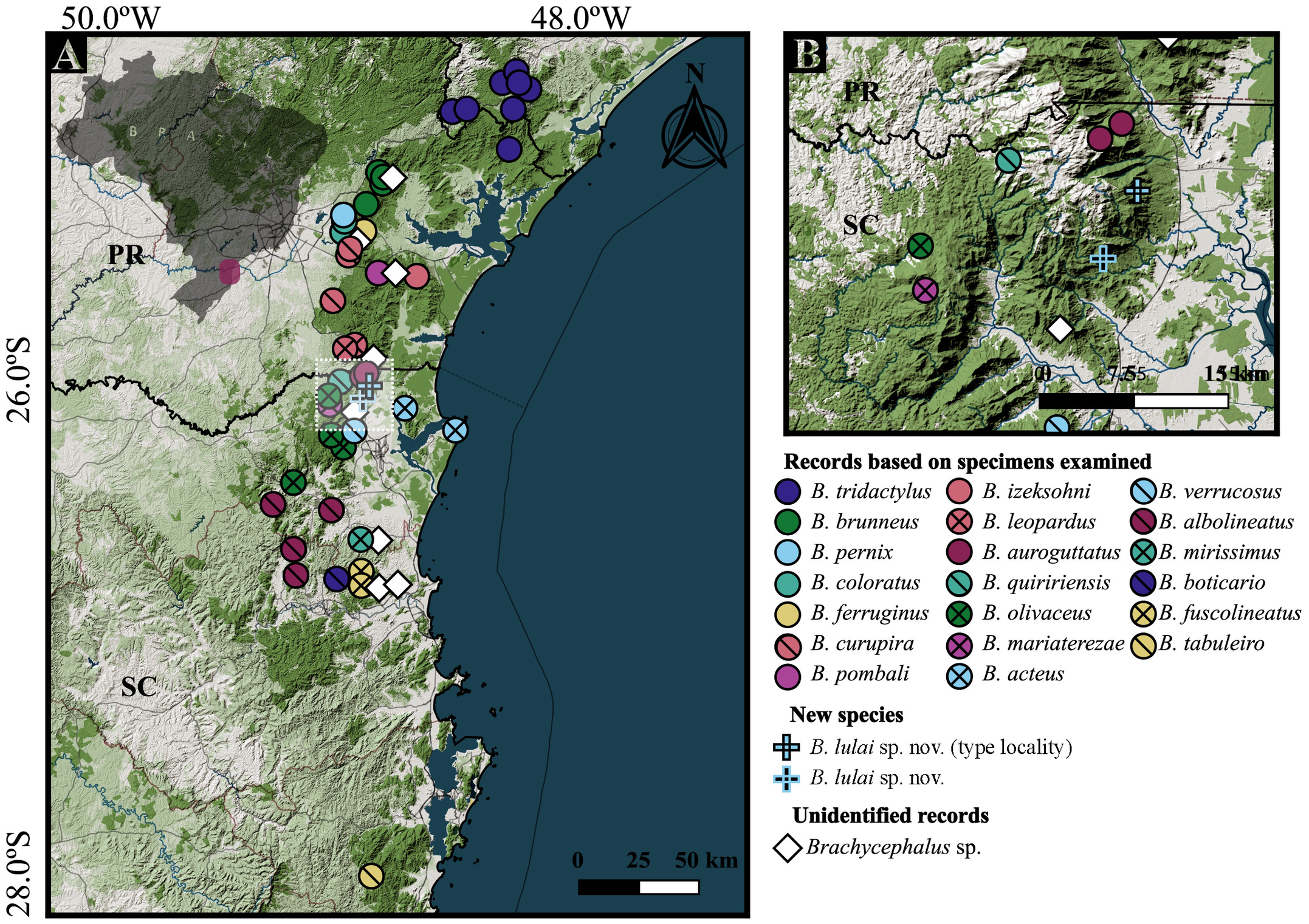
- Geographic distribution of B. lulai, marked with a blue cross [+]

= Brachycephalus lulai =

Species of tiny frog

Brachycephalus lulai is a species of small frog in the family Brachycephalidae endemic to the Atlantic Forest of Brazil. It is one of more than 40 named species within the genus Brachycephalus, and is most closely related to Brachycephalus auroguttatus and Brachycephalus quiririensis.

== Etymology ==
The specific name lulai honours Luiz Inácio Lula da Silva, the President of Brazil.

== Taxonomy ==
More than 40 species of Brachycephalus are recognized, generally divided into two major subcategories, both of which are polyphyletic groups: the more speciose "pumpkin toadlets", characterized by their brighter colors (red, orange, yellow, and green patterns) and bufoniform (more stout) body blan, and the less diverse "flea-toads", characterized by their dull colors and leptodactyliform (more slender) body plan. B. lulai is recognized as a pumpkin toadlet. In their 2025 description of this species, Bornschein and colleagues tested its phylogenetic relationships with select members of the Brachycephalus pernix species group, which they hypothesized B. lulai belongs to. They recovered it in an unresolved polytomous clade with B. auroguttatus and B. quiririensis, both of which are known from the same region. These results are displayed in the cladogram below:

- - - Brachycephalus pombali
    - - Brachycephalus ferruginus
      - Brachycephalus pernix
  - - Brachycephalus auroguttatus
    - Brachycephalus lulai
    - Brachycephalus quiririensis

== Description ==
Brachycephalus lulai is a small species; adult males range from 8.9–11.3 millimetres (0.35–0.44 in) (SVL), while females are slightly larger, at 11.7–13.4 mm (0.46–0.53 in). As a pumpkin toadlet, it has a rounder body and brighter coloration than the more slender and dull flea-toads of the genus. Its skin is smooth on the top but rough on the sides, its snout is rounded when seen from above, and it has a bright orange color with irregular greenish to brownish dots on the sides and belly.
