= Eleutherodactylus jaumei =

Conservation status
- Critically Endangered (IUCN 3.1)

Scientific classification
- Kingdom: Animalia
- Phylum: Chordata
- Class: Amphibia
- Order: Anura
- Clade: Brachycephaloidea
- Family: Eleutherodactylidae
- Genus: Eleutherodactylus
- Species: E. jaumei

Binomial name
- Eleutherodactylus jaumei Estrada & Alonso, 1997

Species of amphibian

Eleutherodactylus jaumei is a species of frog in the family Eleutherodactylidae. This critically endangered species is endemic to a tiny area in Sierra Maestra in southeastern Cuba, where it mostly lives in closed mesic forest.

E. jaumei is relatively brightly marked in yellow-orange and very small, up to c. 1.3 cm (0.51 in) in snout–to–vent length. It is part of a closely related Cuban group that contains five additional described species (E. cubanus, E. etheridgei, E. iberia, E. limbatus and E. orientalis) and at least one undescribed species; most of which are of tiny size, relatively brightly colored and possibly aposematic (at least E. iberia and E. orientalis have alkaloid toxins in their skin).
