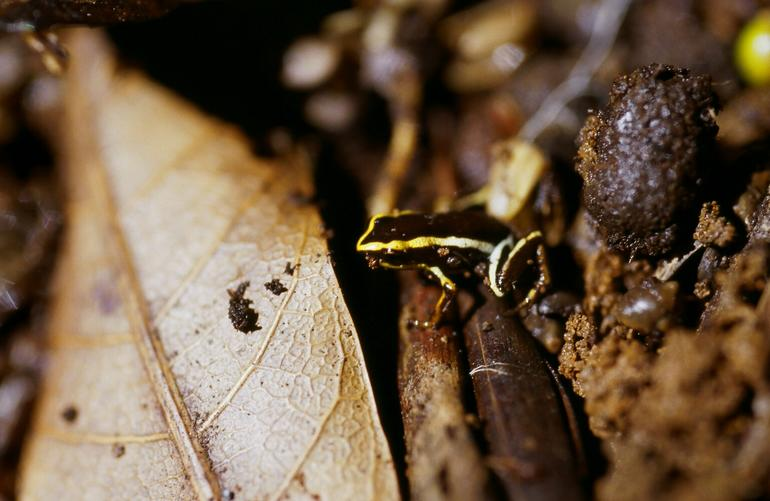

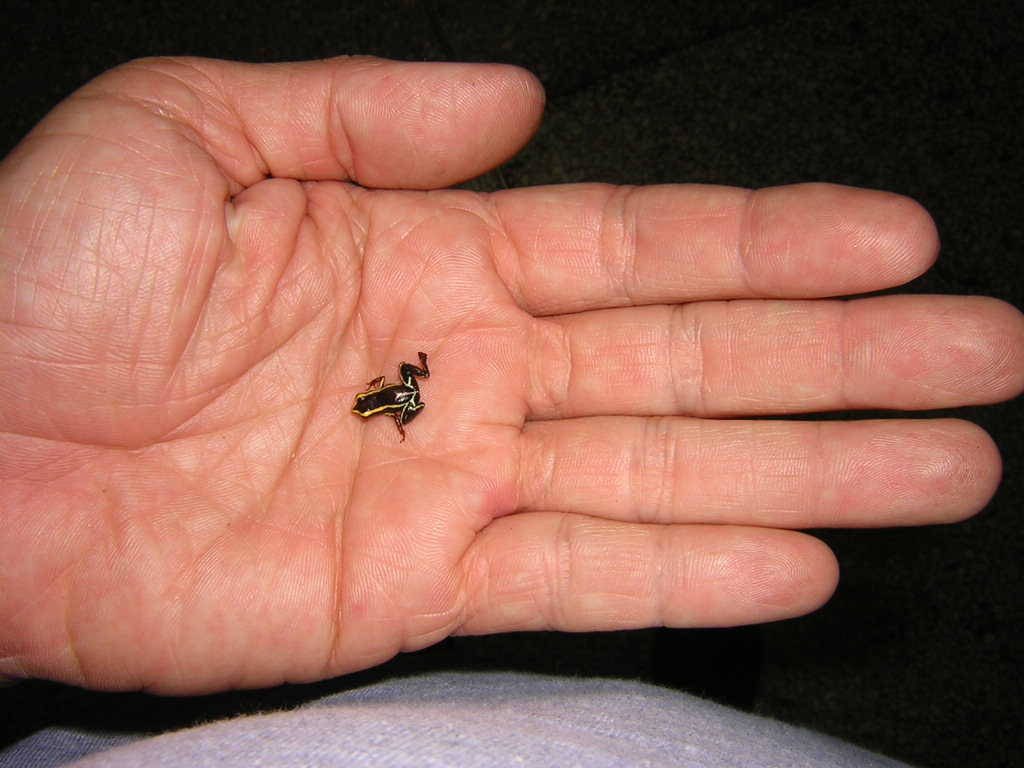
- Individual on the forest floor (above), another on a hand showings the species' minute size (below)

Conservation status
- Critically Endangered (IUCN 3.1)

Scientific classification
- Kingdom: Animalia
- Phylum: Chordata
- Class: Amphibia
- Order: Anura
- Clade: Brachycephaloidea
- Family: Eleutherodactylidae
- Genus: Eleutherodactylus
- Subgenus: Euhyas
- Species: E. iberia

Binomial name
- Eleutherodactylus iberia Estrada and Hedges, 1996
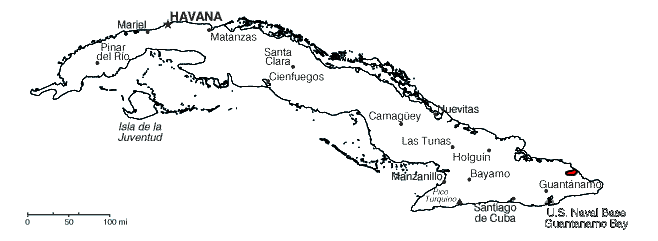
- Distribution in Cuba in red

= Monte Iberia eleuth =

Species of amphibian

The Monte Iberia eleuth (Eleutherodactylus iberia), also known as the Monte Iberia dwarf frog, is a species of eleutherodactylid frog. It is critically endangered and endemic to rainforest in a small part of easternmost Cuba. It is the smallest frog in the Northern Hemisphere and the third smallest frog in the world, at about 10 mm (0.4 in) in snout–to–vent length (only a few members of the Southern Hemisphere genera Brachycephalus, Mini, Paedophryne and Stumpffia are smaller).

It was first discovered in 1993 on Mount Iberia in the Holguín Province, from which it gets its name. Much remains unknown about this small creature. It is part of a closely related Cuban group that contains five additional described species (E. cubanus, E. etheridgei, E. jaumei, E. limbatus and E. orientalis) and at least one undescribed species; most of which are of tiny size, relatively brightly colored and possibly aposematic (at least E. iberia and E. orientalis have alkaloid toxins in their skin).

== Discovery ==
This diminutive species was first documented by Cuban scientist Alberto R. Estrada of the Institute of Forest Research in Havana, working with S. Blair Hedges of Pennsylvania State University in association with the National Science Foundation's Biotic Surveys and Inventories Program. On a 1993 expedition to Cuchillas de Moa in search of the ivory-billed woodpecker (now believed to be extinct), four E. iberia specimens were collected after being uncovered under leaf litter and among the roots of ferns in a secondary hardwood forest on the western slope of Monte Iberia. The find was published in the journal Copeia, where the name Eleutherodactylus iberia was introduced.

== Description ==
Three adult males in the type series measure 9.6–10 mm (0.4–0.4 in) and the sole adult female 10.5 mm (0.4 in) in snout–vent length.

E. iberia is physically similar to E. limbatus and E. orientalis, but it is generally darker and the lines on its back do not extend as far to the rear. Because of the extreme miniaturization of the species, it possesses fewer teeth than related species and a laryngeal apparatus comparable in size to the head of a pin (resulting in a high-pitched call of a series of irregular chirps, comparable to other species of the genus).

Reproductive information is extremely limited. The female specimen which was the sole source of data thus far was found beside an egg, suggesting E. iberia lays a single egg in each clutch and the parents are closely involved in raising the young (as is common with animals which birth few offspring a time).

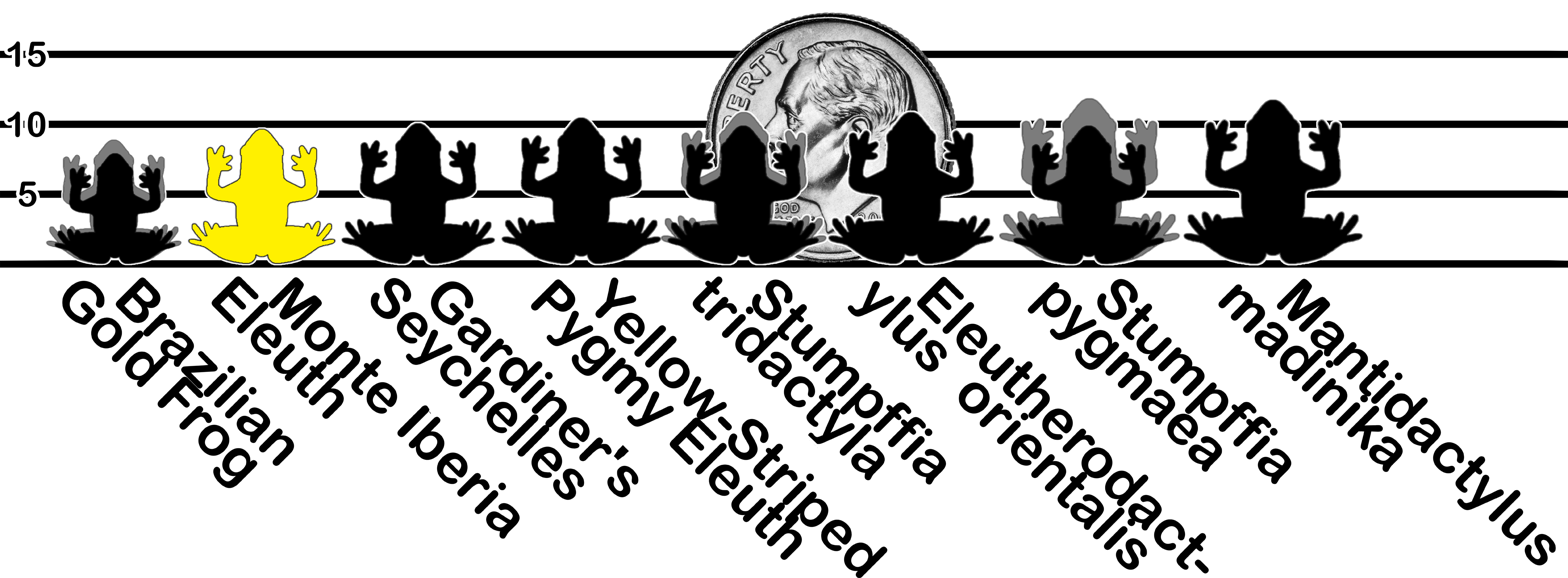

== Habitat ==
Only two isolated populations are known to exist, both in the Holguín Province of eastern Cuba at elevations under 600 m above sea level. The first location is on top of the Monte Iberia tableland where the frog was discovered. The second is smaller (less than 100 km^{2}) and sparsely occupied, near Nibujón at sea level. This latter area has suffered great disturbances over the past 40 years from human activities.

E. iberia exists in areas of closed rainforest with poorly drained soil; it requires high humidity for its survival.

== Diet ==
The Monte Iberia Eleuth has a similar diet to other small frogs, despite its miniature size. It hunts and eats a wide range of invertebrates, feeding on insects, moths, and spiders.
