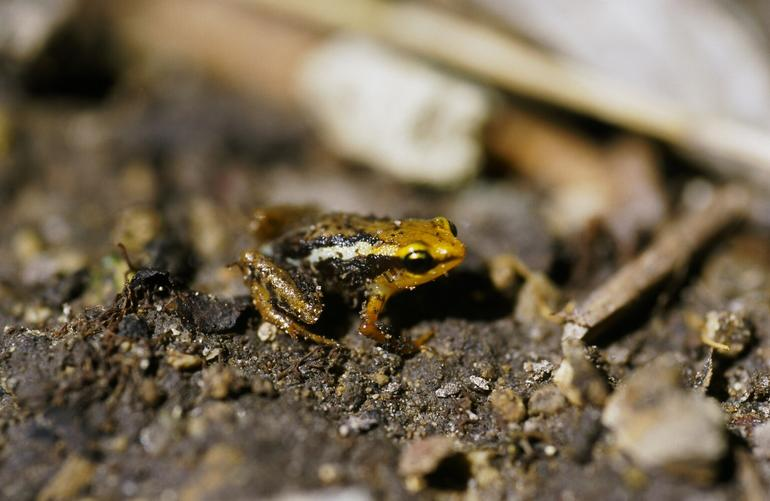

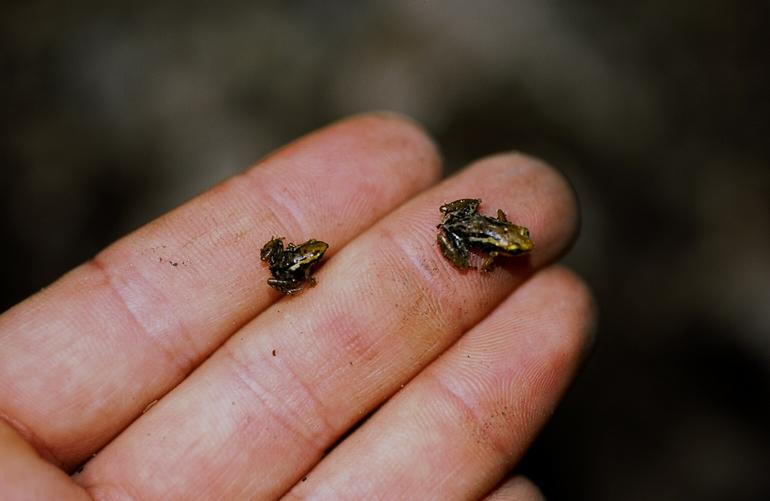
- Individual on the forest floor (above), two on a hand showings the species' minute size (below)

Conservation status
- Critically Endangered (IUCN 3.1)

Scientific classification
- Kingdom: Animalia
- Phylum: Chordata
- Class: Amphibia
- Order: Anura
- Family: Eleutherodactylidae
- Genus: Eleutherodactylus
- Species: E. orientalis

Binomial name
- Eleutherodactylus orientalis (Barbour & Shreve, 1937)

Synonyms
- Sminthillus limbatus ssp. orientalis Barbour & Shreve, 1937

= Eleutherodactylus orientalis =

Species of amphibian

Eleutherodactylus orientalis, the Oriental robber frog or Baracoa dwarf frog, is a species of frog in the family Eleutherodactylidae. It is endemic to the vicinity of El Yunque, Baracoa, in easternmost Cuba. Although locally common, it requires undisturbed moist forest and has a tiny range, making it critically endangered from habitat loss and degradation.

E. orientalis is relatively brightly marked in yellow and very small, females averaging 1.33 cm (0.52 in) in snout–to–vent length and males 1.25 cm (0.49 in). It is part of a closely related Cuban group that contains five additional described species (E. cubanus, E. etheridgei, E. iberia, E. jaumei and E. limbatus) and at least one undescribed species; most of which are of tiny size, relatively brightly colored and possibly aposematic (at least E. iberia and E. orientalis have alkaloid toxins in their skin).

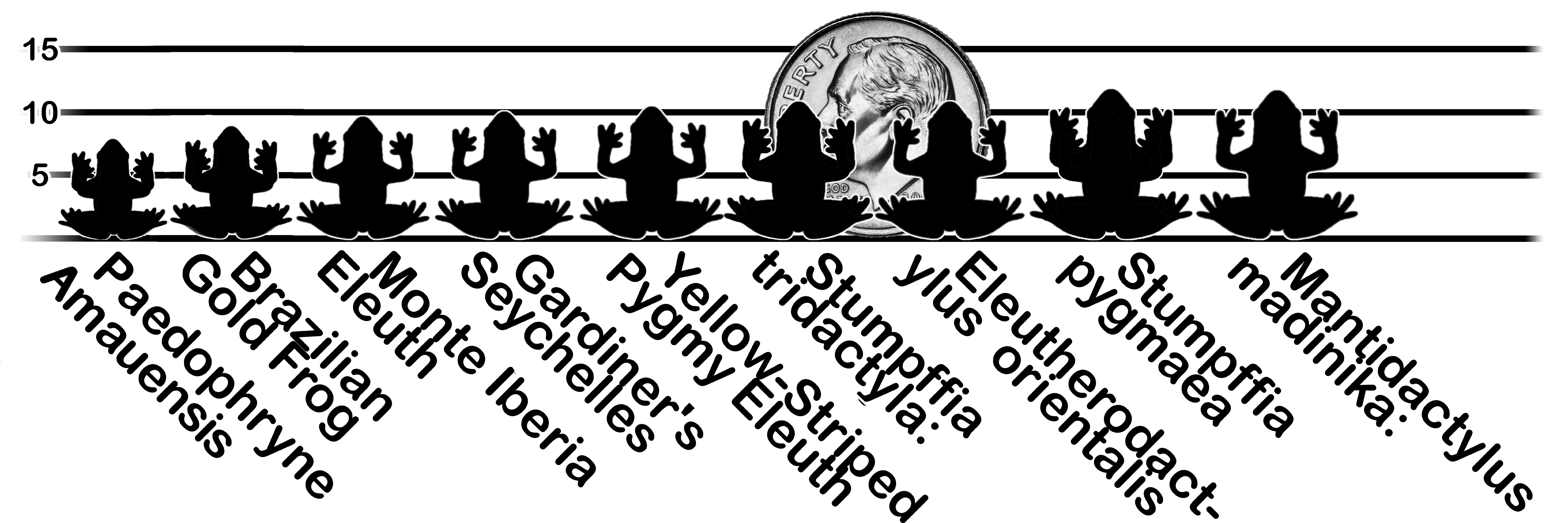
