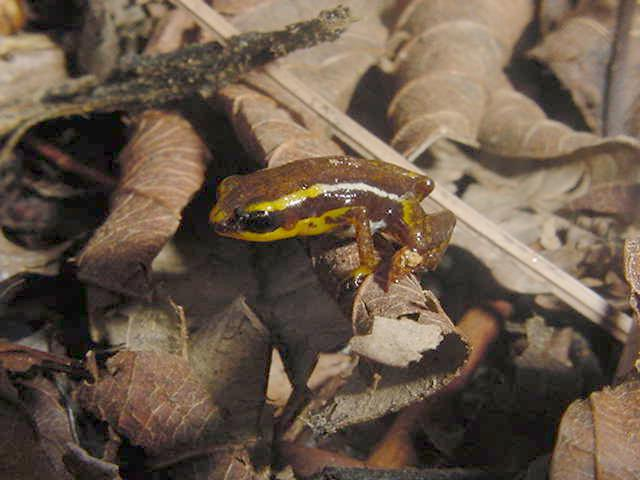

Conservation status
- Vulnerable (IUCN 3.1)

Scientific classification
- Kingdom: Animalia
- Phylum: Chordata
- Class: Amphibia
- Order: Anura
- Family: Eleutherodactylidae
- Genus: Eleutherodactylus
- Species: E. limbatus

Binomial name
- Eleutherodactylus limbatus (Cope, 1862)

Synonyms
- Eleutherodactylus (Euhyas) limbatus (Cope, 1862); Euhyas limbatus (Cope, 1862); Phyllobates limbatus Cope, 1862; Sminthillus limbatus

= Yellow-striped pygmy eleuth =

Species of amphibian

The yellow-striped pygmy eleuth (Eleutherodactylus limbatus), also known as the yellow-striped dwarf frog, is a species of frog in the family Eleutherodactylidae from closed mesic and xeric forests in Cuba.

The yellow-striped pygmy eleuth is relatively brightly marked in orange-yellow and among the smallest frogs in the world, up to 1.18 cm (0.46 in) in snout–to–vent length with males marginally smaller than females. It is part of a closely related Cuban group that contains five additional described species (E. cubanus, E. etheridgei, E. iberia, E. jaumei and E. orientalis) and at least one undescribed species; most of which are of tiny size, relatively brightly colored and possibly aposematic (at least E. iberia and E. orientalis have alkaloid toxins in their skin). Among these, the yellow-striped pygmy eleuth is unique in being quite widespread in Cuba, whereas the others all have very small ranges in the eastern part of the island.

== Mating calls and reproduction ==
E. limbatus has a very intense mating call, but it is brief (6.9 to 24.8 milliseconds) and high-pitched (6.5 to 8.3 kHz), at a rate of 278 per minute. Female frogs have a single ovary and lay one egg at a time, which is subsequently buried in the ground, where it develops quickly.

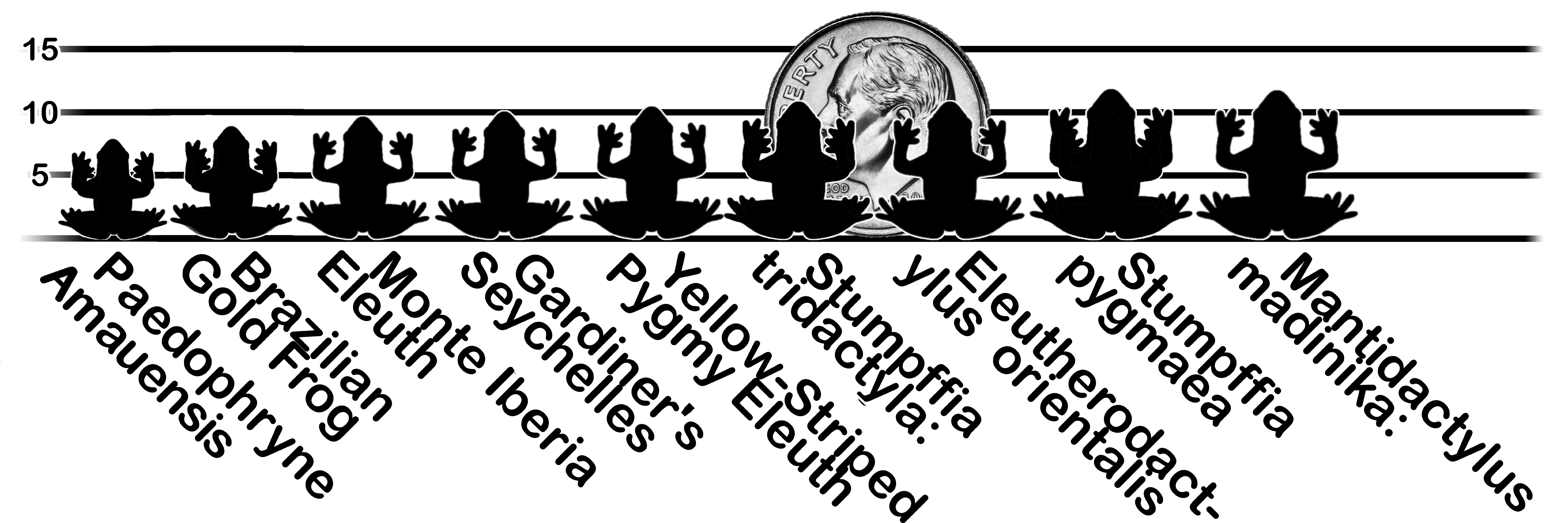

== Habitat ==
These frogs are found in Cuba at elevations up to 1,150 m above sea level, in closed-canopy mesic and xeric forests. Their distribution is highly fragmented, with the total land area equaling 7,700 mi^{2} (20,000 km^{2}). Within this limited area, though, they are quite numerous.
