= Cochlodispus =

Scientific classification
- Domain: Eukaryota
- Kingdom: Animalia
- Phylum: Arthropoda
- Subphylum: Chelicerata
- Class: Arachnida
- Order: Trombidiformes
- Family: Microdispidae
- Genus: Cochlodispus; Mahunka, 1972

Type species
- Cochlodispus cochleatus Mahunka, 1969

Diversity
- 11 species

Genus of mite

Cochlodispus is a genus of mites from the family Microdispidae. One member of the genus, Cochlodispus minimus, is considered the smallest known mite species with a recorded adult body length of 79 μm (0.079 mm).

== Characteristics ==
The Microdispidae are the least diverse family of pygmephoroid mites, with 20 described genera and about 120 species. Most members of the family are fungivores, although some may be parasitoids of insects. All 11 described species of Cochlodispus inhabit soil and litter. The type species, Cochlodispus cochleatus, was originally designated Microdispus cochleatus by Sándor Mahunka in 1969. Three years later, Mahunka formally described Cochlodispus as a distinct genus.

== Species ==
The genus Cochlodispus currently contains 11 species:

- Cochlodispus africanus Mahunka, 1975 – described from Ethiopia
- Cochlodispus chilensis Mahunka, 1972 – described from Chile
- Cochlodispus cochleatus Mahunka, 1969 – described from Brazil
- Cochlodispus europaeus Mahunka and Mahunka-Papp, 1994 – described from Hungary
- Cochlodispus fimbrisetus Mahunka, 1975 – described from Ethiopia
- Cochlodispus ghilarovi Mahunka, 1977 – described from Abkhazia
- Cochlodispus minimus Mahunka, 1976 – described from Ethiopia
- Cochlodispus pectinifer Mahunka, 1971 – described from Sri Lanka
- Cochlodispus reticordis Mahunka, 1972 – described from New Guinea
- Cochlodispus tarandus Mahunka, 1972 – described from New Guinea
- Cochlodispus zanzibariensis Khaustov and Ermilov, 2018 – described from Zanzibar

An additional species from Belgium was originally described as Cochlodispus operosus but later research suggested it be reassigned to the genus Bakerdania of the family Neopygmephoridae.
