= Cochlodispus minimus =

Scientific classification
- Kingdom: Animalia
- Phylum: Arthropoda
- Subphylum: Chelicerata
- Class: Arachnida
- Order: Trombidiformes
- Family: Microdispidae
- Genus: Cochlodispus
- Species: C. minimus

Binomial name
- Cochlodispus minimus Sándor Mahunka, 1976

Species of mite

Cochlodispus minimus is a species of mite from the family Microdispidae, formally described by Sándor Mahunka in 1976. One adult individual was measured with a body length of 79 μm (0.079 mm), making it the smallest known mite species. It was originally described from Ethiopia, along with cogeners C. africanus and C. fimbrisetus, and inhabits soil and litter.

== Taxonomy ==
The Microdispidae are the least diverse family of pygmephoroid mites, with 20 described genera and about 120 species. Most members of this family are fungivores, although some may be parasitoids of insects. Cochlodispus minimus is one of 11 species currently described from the genus Cochlodispus. It can be distinguished within its genus by the absence of barbs on setae ps_{2} (a characteristic shared only with C. zanzibariensis) and by the absence of barbs on setae f and on the setae of the anterior sternal plate (both distinctly barbed in C. zanzibariensis).

== See also ==
- Smallest organisms
