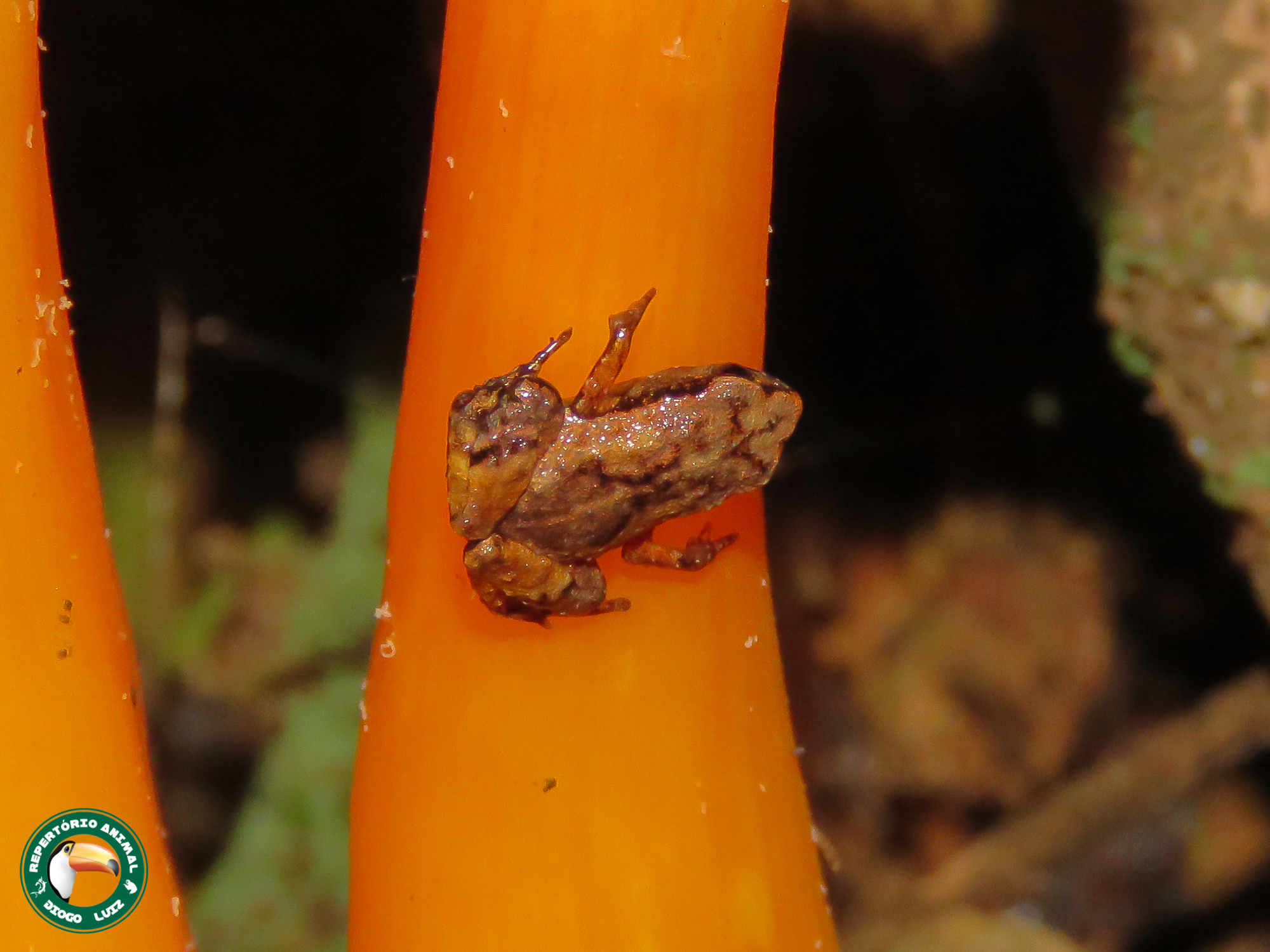
- An adult in Tinguá Biological Reserve, in Rio de Janeiro, Brazil.

Conservation status
- Least Concern (IUCN 3.1)

Scientific classification
- Kingdom: Animalia
- Phylum: Chordata
- Class: Amphibia
- Order: Anura
- Family: Brachycephalidae
- Genus: Brachycephalus
- Species: B. didactylus

Binomial name
- Brachycephalus didactylus (Izecksohn, 1971)

Synonyms
- Psyllophryne didactyla Izecksohn, 1971

= Brazilian gold frog =

Species of amphibian

The Brazilian gold frog (Brachycephalus didactylus), also known as Izecksohn's toad or flea-frog, is a very small species of frogs in the family Brachycephalidae. It is endemic to southeastern Brazil and is known from the central part of the state of Rio de Janeiro and from Serra das Torres in extreme southern Espírito Santo.

All three English names are misleading or potentially confusing. Many species in the genus Brachycephalus are bright yellow-orange, hence the name "Brazilian gold frog", but B. didactylus is all brown. "Izecksohn's toad" leads to easy confusion with another species in the genus, B. izecksohni, and both names refer to the herpetologist Eugênio Izecksohn. "Flea-frog" or "flea-toad" was historically restricted to B. didactylus, once placed in its own genus Psyllophryne instead of Brachycephalus, but a second species, B. hermogenesi, was described in 1998 and two others, B. pulex and B. sulfuratus, have been described since then, bringing it to four species of flea-frogs/toads.

== Comparison with other small frog species ==
At 8.6–10.2 mm (0.34–0.40 in) in snout–to–vent length, B. didactylus is one of the smallest frogs in the world. This species and the roughly similar-sized Eleutherodactylus iberia from Cuba were once regarded as the smallest, but several others that are smaller have since been discovered, including the closely related B. pulex at 8–8.4 mm (0.31–0.33 in), Stumpffia contumelia from Madagascar at 8–9 mm (0.31–0.35 in), and Paedophryne amauensis from New Guinea at 7–8 mm (0.28–0.31 in).

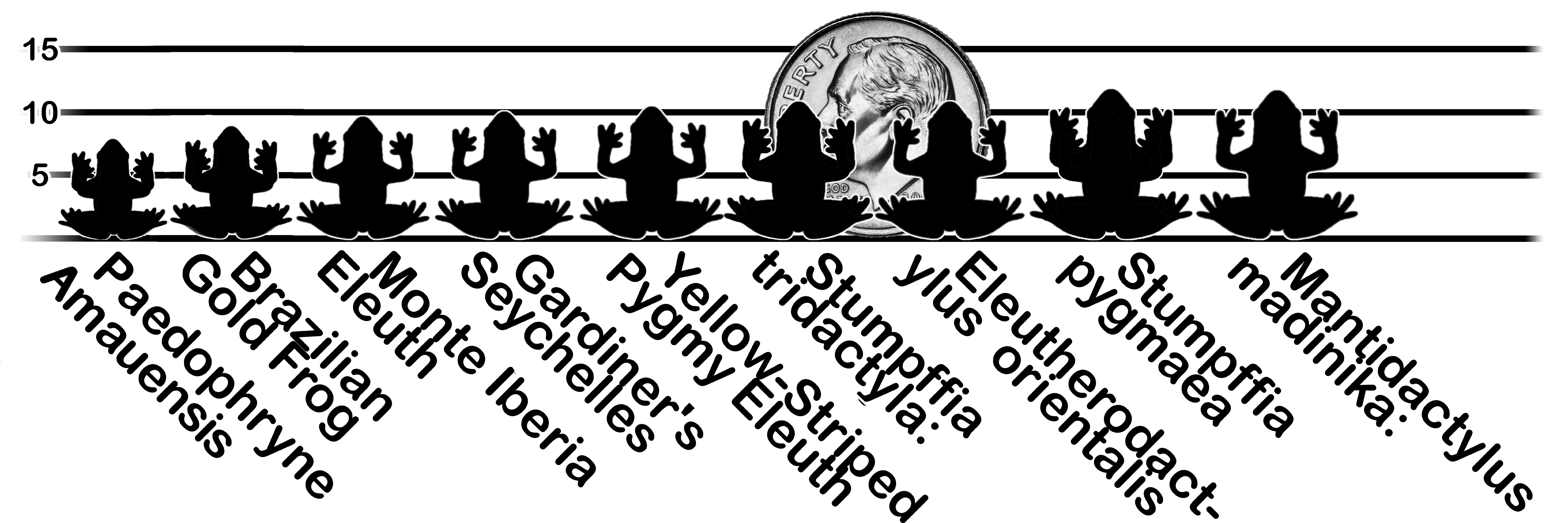
A relative comparison of some of the world's smallest frogs
