= Kelly Zamudio =

American biologist

- Education: University of California Berkeley (B.A.); University of Washington (Ph.D.)
- Scientific career
- Fields: Evolutionary Ecology, Herpetology
- Workplaces: University of Texas Austin
- Website: zamudiolab.org

Kelly Zamudio is the Doherty chair in molecular biology in the Department of Integrative Biology at the University of Texas Austin. She was formerly the Goldwin Smith professor of ecology and evolutionary biology at Cornell University and curator of herpetology at the Cornell Museum of Vertebrates.

== Education ==
Zamudio completed a B.A. in Biology at University of California Berkeley in 1991. She earned a Ph.D. from the University of Washington in 1996.

== Research ==
The Zamudio lab, also known as KZ lab, supports research in the origin and maintenance of biodiversity in reptiles and amphibians. Zamudio, her students, and collaborators have been instrumental in understanding population decline faced by amphibians, with a particular focus on the roles played by disease resistance and the toll of human activity on the landscape. Zamudio's academic interests lie in the fields of population biology, population genetics, systematics, and the genetics of conservation, where she is particularly interested in the links between patterns of geographic genetic differentiation and attributes of the ecology and life history of organisms such as mating systems, dispersal, and demography. She was also an early adopter at Cornell in the Active Learning Initiative which improved student outcomes for members of underrepresented groups. As of April 2020, Zamudio has published over 150 papers which have together received over 9,000 citations.

== Awards and honors ==
- 2019 elected fellow of the American Academy of Arts and Sciences.
- 2018 Stephen H. Weiss Presidential fellow at Cornell University.
- 2017 Menschel distinguished teaching fellow at Cornell University.
