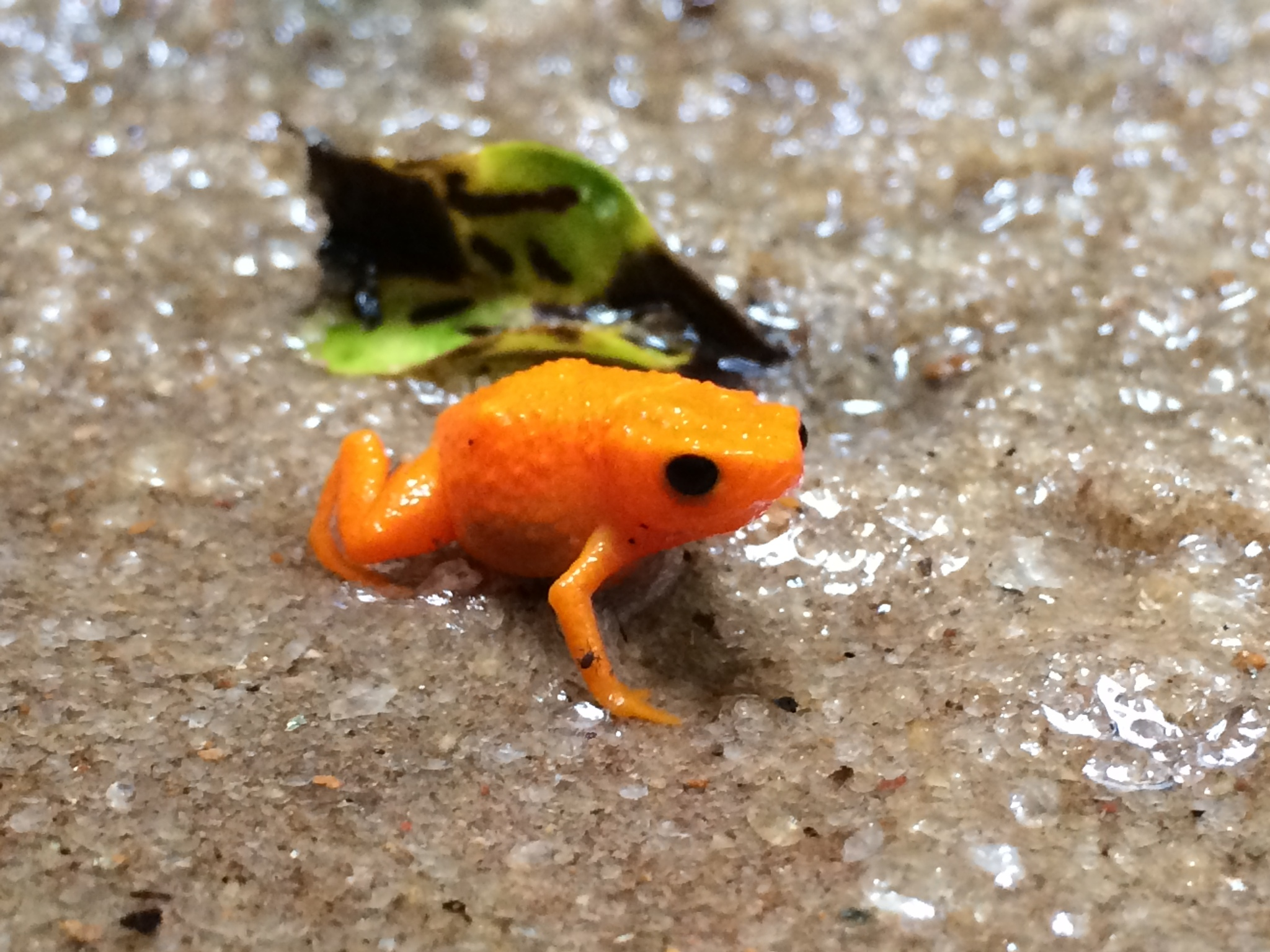

Conservation status
- Critically Endangered (IUCN 3.1)

Scientific classification
- Kingdom: Animalia
- Phylum: Chordata
- Class: Amphibia
- Order: Anura
- Family: Brachycephalidae
- Genus: Brachycephalus
- Species: B. alipioi

Binomial name
- Brachycephalus alipioi Pombal and Gasparini, 2006

= Brachycephalus alipioi =

Species of amphibian

Brachycephalus alipioi is a species of frogs in the family Brachycephalidae, genus Brachycephalus. It is endemic to the Atlantic rainforest of the Espírito Santo state of southeastern Brazil. They can be found walking slowly on the leaf litter or on the forest floor. Mites and spiders were found in the stomachs of two of the specimen, although their diet may be more abundant. All specimens were diurnal.

== Appearance ==
A small, robust species with a SVL of 12.5-16.2 mm. Females are more robust and larger than males. Its body is a uniform orange color, and the eye and a thin line surrounding the eye are black. Its head is wider than it is long with a snout that is semicircular in shape from the dorsal view and is rounded from the lateral view. The nostrils are small and slip shaped, not protuberant and are directed anterolaterally at the end of the snout. The eyes are medium in size and protrude dorsally. The tongue is long and narrow and lacks indentation on the free posterior border. Vomerine teeth and premaxillary teeth are absent. Choanae is small, rounded and anterior to the eye. Arms are slender and fingers are robust, and legs are short and moderately robust, with robust toes. The skin is smooth on the head, throat, and chest, while the dorsum, center of belly, and legs are slightly wrinkled, and the flanks and posterior parts of the thighs are very wrinkled.

== Etymology ==
The name, Brachycephalus alipioi, is in honor of Alipio de Miranda-Ribeiro
