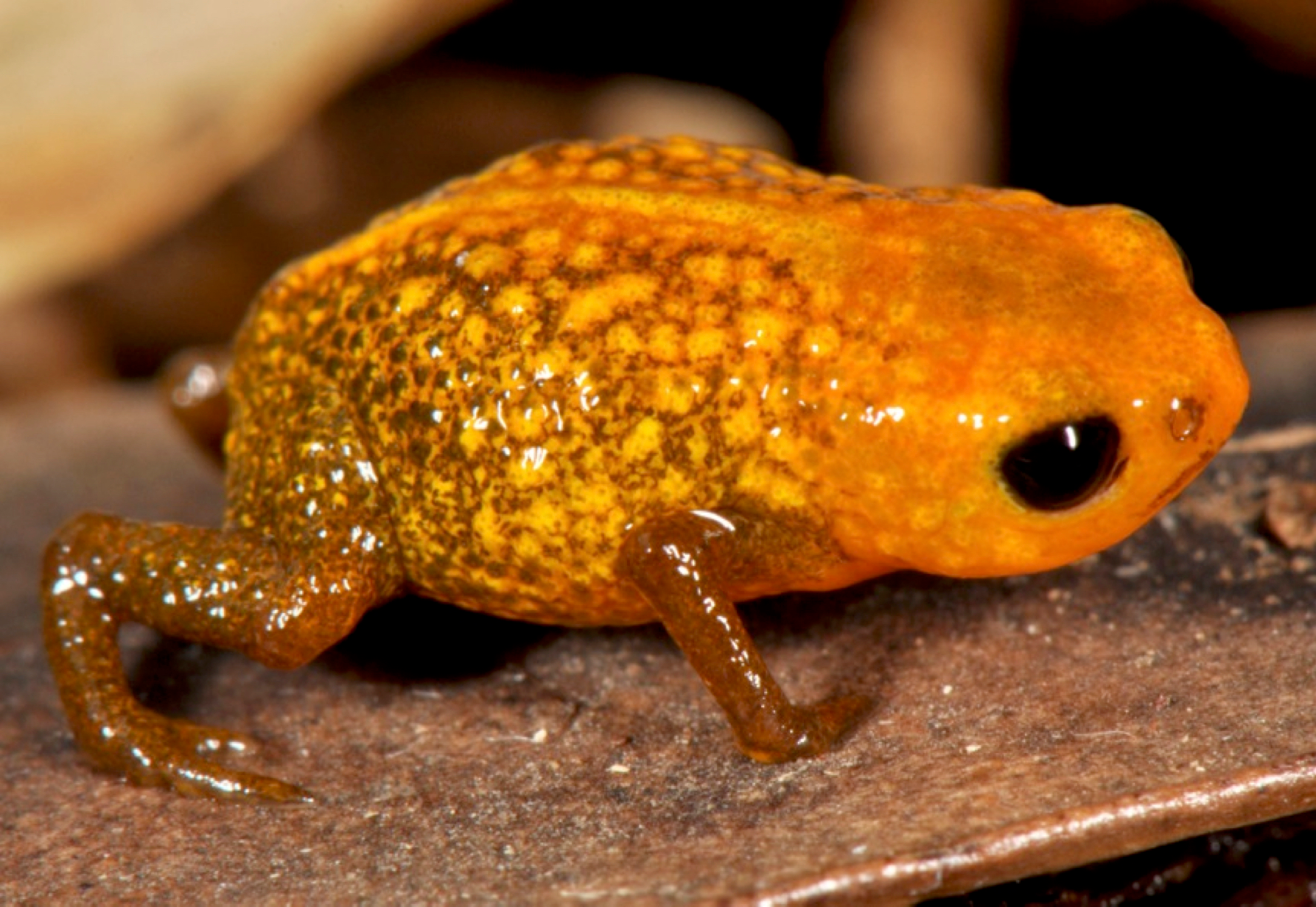

Scientific classification
- Kingdom: Animalia
- Phylum: Chordata
- Class: Amphibia
- Order: Anura
- Family: Brachycephalidae
- Genus: Brachycephalus
- Species: B. auroguttatus

Binomial name
- Brachycephalus auroguttatus Ribeiro et al., 2015

= Brachycephalus auroguttatus =

Species of frog

Brachycephalus auroguttatus is a species of frog in the family Brachycephalidae. It is very tiny and was one of seven new species described by LF Ribeiro and a team of scientists from the Mater Natura - Instituto de Estudos Ambientais in Brazil. Like all species in its genus, it is found in a very small strip of Atlantic Forest in the southeastern coast of the country, and has a vibrant colour pattern. The speciation seen in this genus is thought to be a byproduct of the rift between the valley versus mountain terrain and its particular microclimates, to which they are adapted. It might be in population decline due to habitat loss. Its name comes from the Latin aurum for "gold" and gutta "drop" or "speck", in reference to golden spots found throughout the skin of this species.

== Description ==
It differs from its cogenerate species by its robust, bufoniform body; adult average length between 9.0 to 13.6 millimetres (0.35 to 0.54 in); its rough dorsum; and its dorsal coloration that shifts from a bright yellow colour on its head with increasingly brownish towards its posterior section, while its legs and arms carry yellow spots along the back; also, the skin on its dorsum shows no dermal co-ossification. Being a representative of the pernix group, its dorsum is similar to that of B. olivaceus and B. mariaeterezae, which is different to B. izecksohni or B. brunneusto, for example. The species also possesses a yellow stripe on its back, which is less orange than B. pombali's. This species also shows dark spots along the sides of its body and lacks the dermal co-ossification specific within species of the theephippium group.

== Distribution ==
Brachycephalus auroguttatus is known only from its type locality, which is a cloud forest in the Pedra da Tartaruga, a rocky formation in the State of Santa Catarina, at a height of between 1,070 to 1,100 metres (3,510 to 3,610 ft) above sea level.
