= Brachycephalus pombali =

Conservation status
- Data Deficient (IUCN 3.1)

Scientific classification
- Kingdom: Animalia
- Phylum: Chordata
- Class: Amphibia
- Order: Anura
- Family: Brachycephalidae
- Genus: Brachycephalus
- Species: B. pombali

Binomial name
- Brachycephalus pombali Alves, Ribeiro, Haddad, and Reis, 2006
- Brachycephalus pombali is only known from Guaratuba, in the Serra do Mar of Brazil

Species of amphibian

Brachycephalus pombali is a species of frogs in the family Brachycephalidae. It is endemic to Brazil and only known from its type locality, "Morro dos Padres, Pico da Igreja", in the Serra do Mar in Guaratuba, Paraná state. The type locality is at about 1,300 m (4,300 ft) above sea level.

== Etymology ==
The specific name pombali honors José Perez Pombal, Jr., a Brazilian herpetologist who has worked with the genus Brachycephalus.

== Description ==
As all brachycephalids, Brachycephalus pombali are small: adult males measure 12.6–13.9 mm (0.50–0.55 in) and females 14.6–15.3 mm (0.57–0.60 in) in snout–vent length; this miniaturization is associated with loss of phalanges in hands and feet. The body is robust and toad-like. There is no tympanum. The general color is orange, lateral surfaces have small dark brown spots, and belly has brownish coalescent spots and small dots. The skin on top of the head and central part of the back body is smooth and without dermal co-ossification, whereas the skin on dorso-lateral surfaces of body, flanks, and dorsal surface of thighs is granular.

== Habitat and conservation ==
Brachycephalus pombali inhabit the leaf litter in the Atlantic Rainforest. They are active by day. Adult males are exposed on the litter when calling. There are no known threats to this species, but it is only known from a single location.
