= Brachycephalus vertebralis =

Conservation status
- Data Deficient (IUCN 3.1)

Scientific classification
- Kingdom: Animalia
- Phylum: Chordata
- Class: Amphibia
- Order: Anura
- Family: Brachycephalidae
- Genus: Brachycephalus
- Species: B. vertebralis

Binomial name
- Brachycephalus vertebralis Pombal, 2001

Species of frog

Brachycephalus vertebralis is a species of frog in the family Brachycephalidae endemic to Brazil. It is known only from Serra da Bocaina National Park and Cunha, São Paulo and occurs at 800 meters above sea level. It has not been seen again since 1998 despite several surveys, and it was first collected on the forest floor of primary forest. Its natural habitat is subtropical or tropical moist lowland forests.

It is threatened by habitat loss from agriculture and logging, but the species occurs in three protected areas including Serra da Bocaina.
