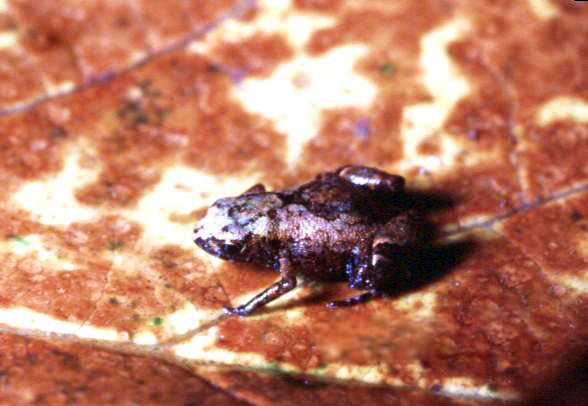

Conservation status
- Least Concern (IUCN 3.1)

Scientific classification
- Kingdom: Animalia
- Phylum: Chordata
- Class: Amphibia
- Order: Anura
- Clade: Brachycephaloidea
- Family: Brachycephalidae
- Genus: Brachycephalus
- Species: B. hermogenesi

Binomial name
- Brachycephalus hermogenesi (Giaretta & Sawaya, 1998)

= Flea-frog =

Species of amphibian

The flea-frog (Brachycephalus hermogenesi) is a species of frog in the family Brachycephalidae. It is endemic to Brazil and its distribution includes the states of São Paulo and Rio de Janeiro.

Its natural habitat is subtropical or tropical moist lowland forests. It is threatened by habitat loss.

Brachycephalus hermogenesi is part of the dull colored assemblage of the family Brachycephalidae and is distinguished from other species of the genus Brachycephalus by its complex calling activity.
