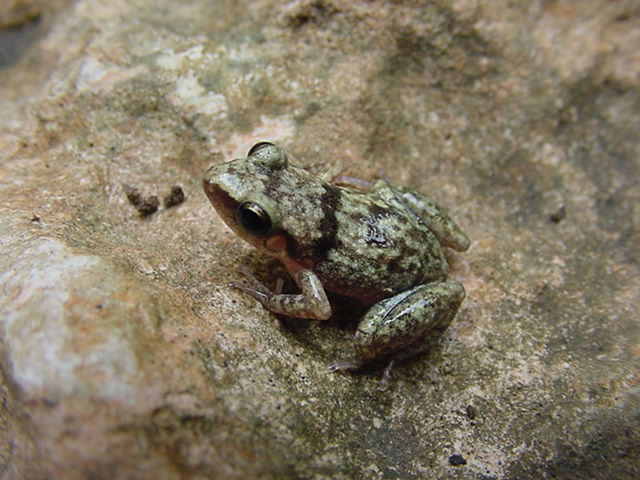

Conservation status
- Endangered (IUCN 3.1)

Scientific classification
- Kingdom: Animalia
- Phylum: Chordata
- Class: Amphibia
- Order: Anura
- Clade: Brachycephaloidea
- Family: Eleutherodactylidae
- Genus: Eleutherodactylus
- Species: E. etheridgei

Binomial name
- Eleutherodactylus etheridgei Schwartz, 1958

= Eleutherodactylus etheridgei =

Species of amphibian

Eleutherodactylus etheridgei is a species of frog in the family Eleutherodactylidae endemic to Cuba. Its natural habitats are subtropical or tropical moist lowland forest and rocky areas. It is threatened by habitat loss.
