= Ischnocnema bolbodactyla =

Conservation status
- Least Concern (IUCN 3.1)

Scientific classification
- Kingdom: Animalia
- Phylum: Chordata
- Class: Amphibia
- Order: Anura
- Family: Brachycephalidae
- Genus: Ischnocnema
- Species: I. bolbodactyla

Binomial name
- Ischnocnema bolbodactyla (Lutz, 1925)

Synonyms
- Eupemphix bolbodactyla Lutz, 1925; Basanitia bolbodactyla (Lutz, 1925); Eleutherodactylus bolbodactylus (Lutz, 1925)

Species of frog

Ischnocnema bolbodactyla is a species of frog in the family Brachycephalidae. It is endemic to the southern Rio de Janeiro state in Brazil; records from São Paulo apply to Ischnocnema nigriventris and Ischnocnema gehrti.

Ischnocnema bolbodactyla is a leaf-litter species inhabiting primary and secondary forest and forest edge. Reproduction is probably through direct development. It is threatened by habitat loss caused by deforestation, infrastructure development, and fires.
