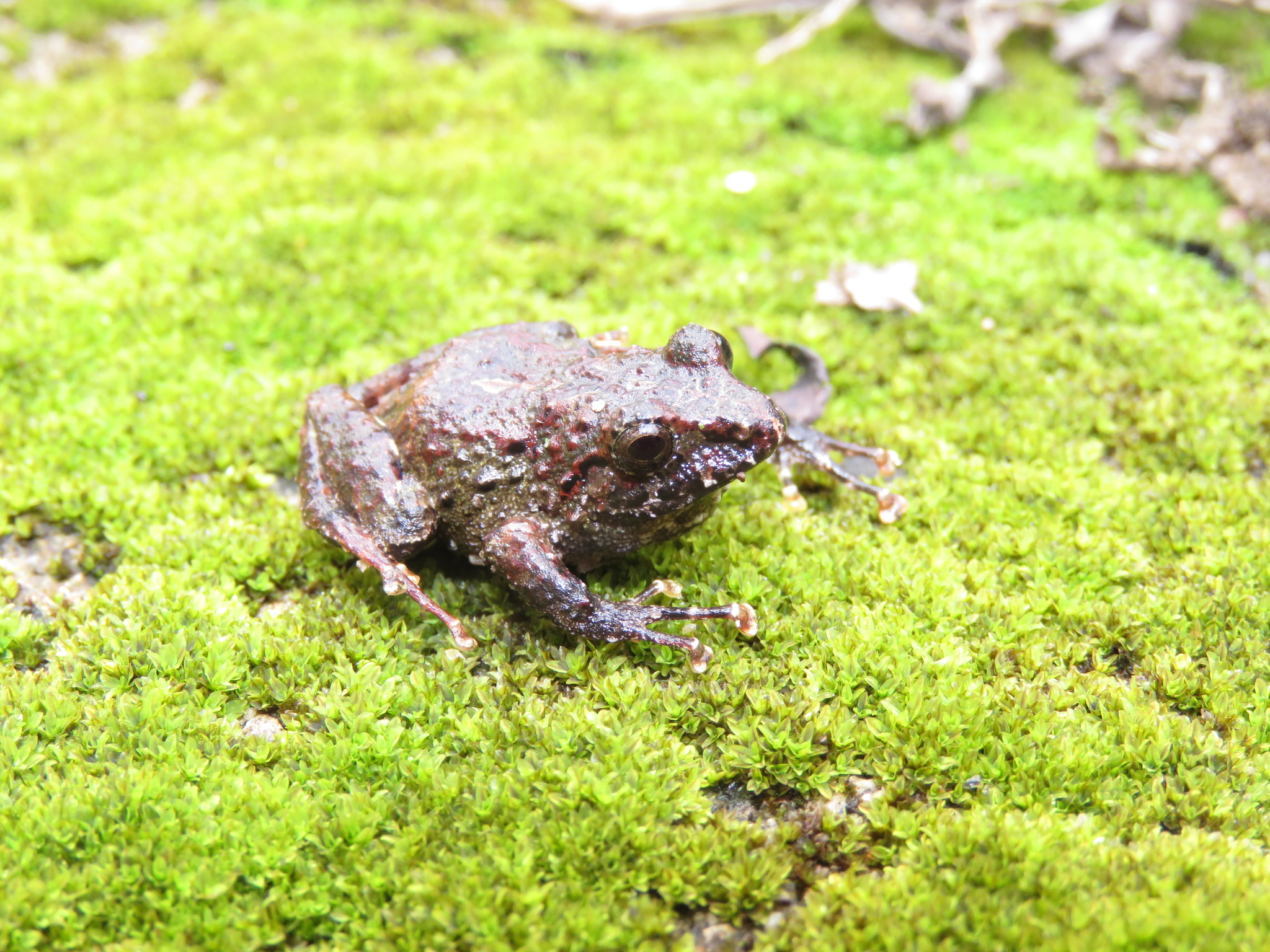
- An adult in Nova Iguaçu, Rio de Janeiro, Brazil.

Conservation status
- Data Deficient (IUCN 3.1)

Scientific classification
- Kingdom: Animalia
- Phylum: Chordata
- Class: Amphibia
- Order: Anura
- Family: Brachycephalidae
- Genus: Ischnocnema
- Species: I. holti

Binomial name
- Ischnocnema holti (Cochran, 1948)

Synonyms
- Eleutherodactylus unistrigatus holti Cochran, 1948; Eleutherodactylus holti Cochran, 1948

= Ischnocnema holti =

Species of frog

Ischnocnema holti is a species of frog in the family Brachycephalidae. It is endemic to the state of Rio de Janeiro, Brazil, and is known from the Serra da Mantiqueira in Itatiaia and Serra dos Órgãos in Teresópolis. The species name is from the collector Ernest Golsan Holt and the common name Holt's robber frog has been coined for this species.

== Description ==
Adult males measure 14–32 mm (0.55–1.26 in) and females 18–31 mm (0.71–1.22 in) in snout–vent length. The habitus is robust. The head is wider than long. The snout is rounded. The tympanum is distinct. The dorsum is smooth to granular, with small granulations on the sides. Discs on fingers and toes are well-developed. The dorsal coloration is variable: uniformly dark brown or gray, exhibiting green or irregularly distributed red spots, sometimes with two dark longitudinal bands running from the eyes to the posterior region, or light green with brown spots.

== Habitat and conservation ==
Ischnocnema holti inhabits forests, ravines, and high-altitude grasslands. Its altitudinal range in Itatiaia is 2,000–2,400 m (6,600–7,900 ft) above sea level, although a male was heard calling at 1670 m in Garganta do Registro. In Serra dos Órgãos it occurs above 1,200 m (3,900 ft). Males call from vegetation up to 4 m above the ground.

The species is present in the Itatiaia National Park, where its type locality lies, as well as in the Serra dos Órgãos National Park. It is abundant in both locations.
