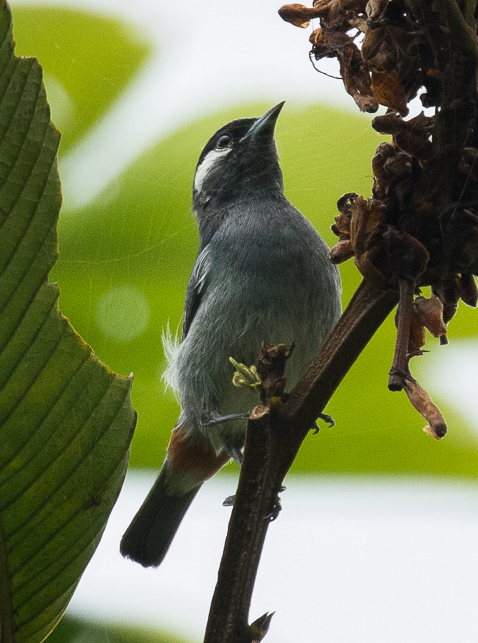
- A male White-eared conebill in Darién, Panama

Conservation status
- Least Concern (IUCN 3.1)

Scientific classification
- Kingdom: Animalia
- Phylum: Chordata
- Class: Aves
- Order: Passeriformes
- Family: Thraupidae
- Genus: Conirostrum
- Species: C. leucogenys

Binomial name
- Conirostrum leucogenys (Lafresnaye, 1852)

= White-eared conebill =

Species of bird

The white-eared conebill (Conirostrum leucogenys) is a species of bird in the family Thraupidae.

It is found in Colombia, Panama, and Venezuela. Its natural habitats are subtropical or tropical moist lowland forests and heavily degraded former forest.

== Taxonomy ==
The white-eared conebill was described by French ornithologist Frédéric de Lafresnaye in 1852. It was originally described by de Lafresnaye as a dacnis, and placed in the genus Dacnis, before later being moved into the defunct genus Ateleodacnis, and then later into its current genus Conirostrum with the rest of the conebill species. There are currently three recognized subspecies:

- C. l. leucogenys - (Lafresnaye, 1852): The Magdalena River Valley in Colombia to the area between the Sierra de Perijá and the Mérida Andes in Zulia state
- C. l. panamense - (Griscom, 1927): Darién Gap of Panama and bordering northwest Colombia
- C. l. cyanochorum - (Todd, 1924): Mérida Andes and the Sierra de Perijá of Venezuela

== Description ==
The white-eared conebill is a small (7g) bird. Subspecies are similar in appearance across their range. Adult males have a blue back, wings, and tail, and a light blue, sometimes greyish, underpart with a rufous undertail covert. They have a black crown, face, and lores, and a white cheek. Immature males are similar but have a less bold black colouring on the face and crown. Females are more subtly coloured, with a lighter blue back, crown, nape, and tail, with the primaries being olive coloured and the breast, belly, flanks, and face being yellow. Both sexes have greyish-black legs, silver bills, and brown eyes.

== Behaviour ==
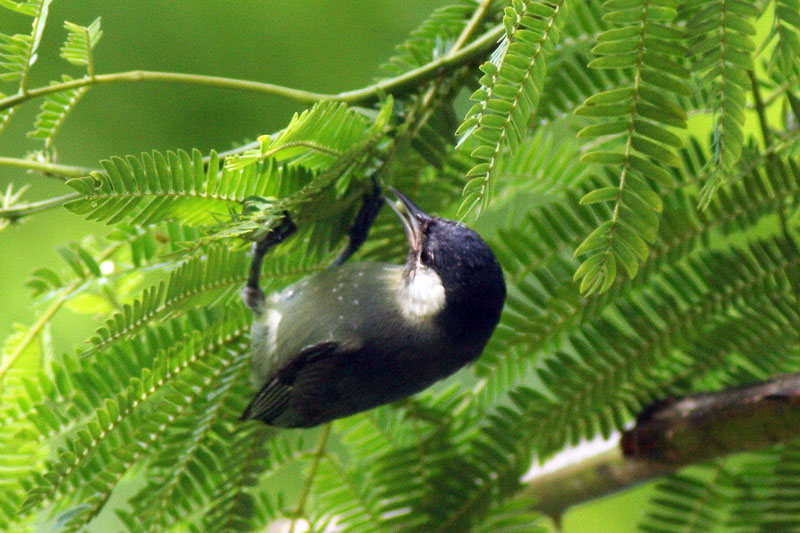
White-eared conebill foraging in Zulia, Venezuela

Like other conebills, the white-eared conebill mainly eats insects, foraging usually in the canopies of trees. It has also been known to join mixed species flocks but not to the same frequency as other relatives like the blue-backed conebill and the white-browed conebill.

== Distribution ==
The white-eared conebill is found in South and Central America, in the countries of Colombia, Panama, and Venezuela.
