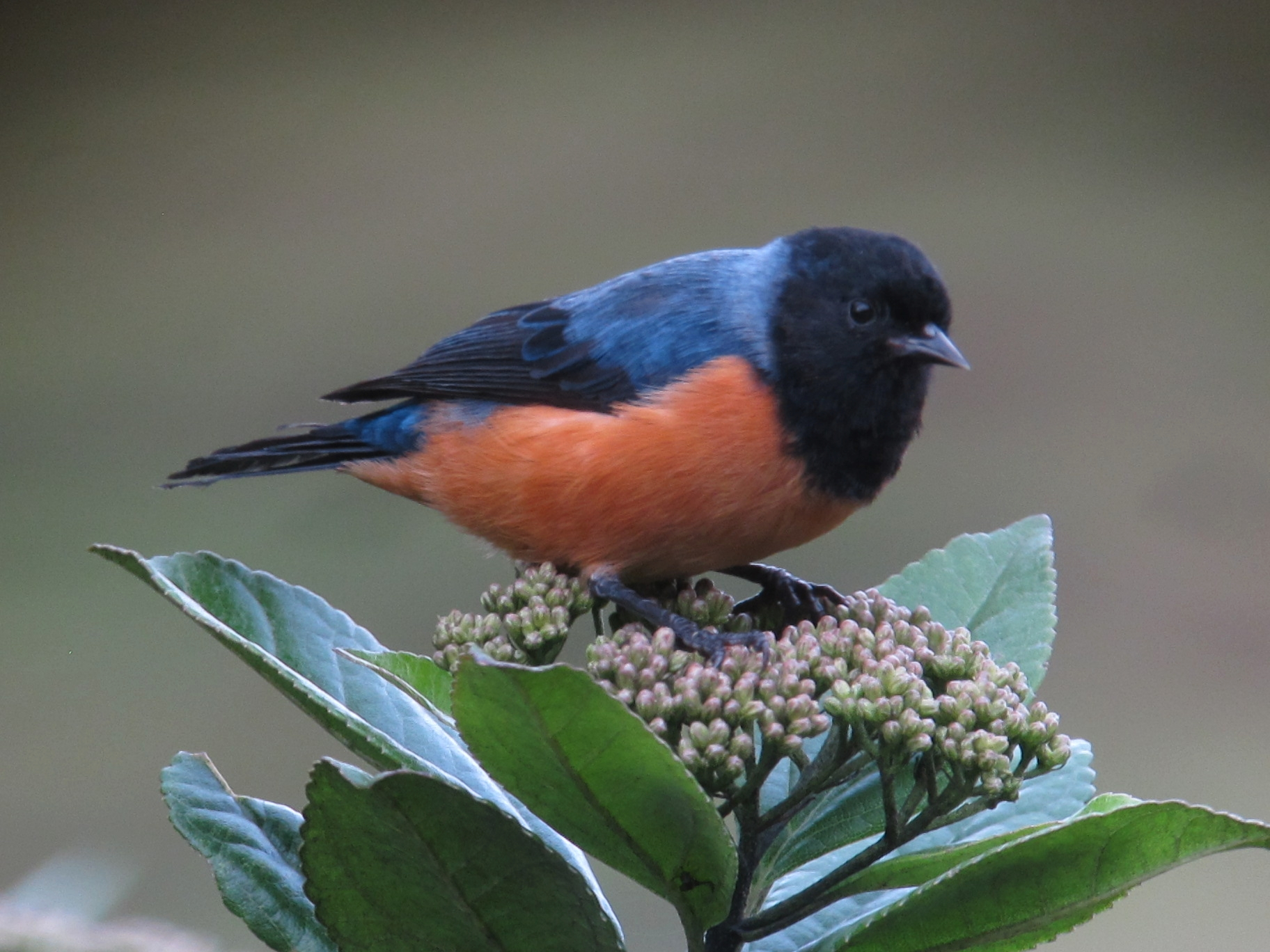
- C. s. sitticolor seen in Caldas, Colombia on top of a Chilca plant Song and calls of Blue-backed Conebill

Conservation status
- Least Concern (IUCN 3.1)

Scientific classification
- Kingdom: Animalia
- Phylum: Chordata
- Class: Aves
- Order: Passeriformes
- Family: Thraupidae
- Genus: Conirostrum
- Species: C. sitticolor

Binomial name
- Conirostrum sitticolor Lafresnaye, 1840

= Blue-backed conebill =

Species of bird

The blue-backed conebill (Conirostrum sitticolor) is a species of bird in the family Thraupidae (South American tanagers). It is found in Bolivia, Colombia, Ecuador, Peru, and Venezuela. Its natural habitat is subtropical or tropical moist montane forests.

== Taxonomy ==
The blue-backed conebill was described by French ornithologist Frédéric de Lafresnaye in 1840 who placed it in the genus Conirostrum, along with the other species of conebills. It was originally called the purple conebill, with two of its subspecies, C. s. intermedium and C. s. cyaneum, being described as different species, the Venezuelan purple conebill and the Peruvian purple conebill, respectively. There are currently three recognized subspecies:

- C. s. sitticolor - (Lafresnaye, 1840): Central Ranges of Colombia, through Ecuador into the west slopes of the Andes of northwestern Peru
- C. s. intermedium - (Berlepsch, 1893): the Andes of western Venezuela in the states of Mérida and Táchira
- C. s. cyaneum - (Taczanowski, 1875): the eastern slopes of the Andes from northern Peru into central Bolivia.

== Description ==
The blue-backed conebill is a small bird, weighing 11-13g. While subspecies differ slightly in appearance, all subspecies have some amount of black on their head, a blue back, rump, and tail, and an orange underside. The nominate subspecies, C. s. sitticolor has a fully black head and throat, and black wings, while C. s. cyaneum has a black cheek, chin, lore, and crown with a blue post-ocular stripe and throat, and blue wings. As the name would indicate, C. s. intermedium has an appearance intermediate between the two subspecies, with a black face, throat, and crown, a blue post-ocular stripe that doesn't extend past the eye and black wings.

== Behaviour ==
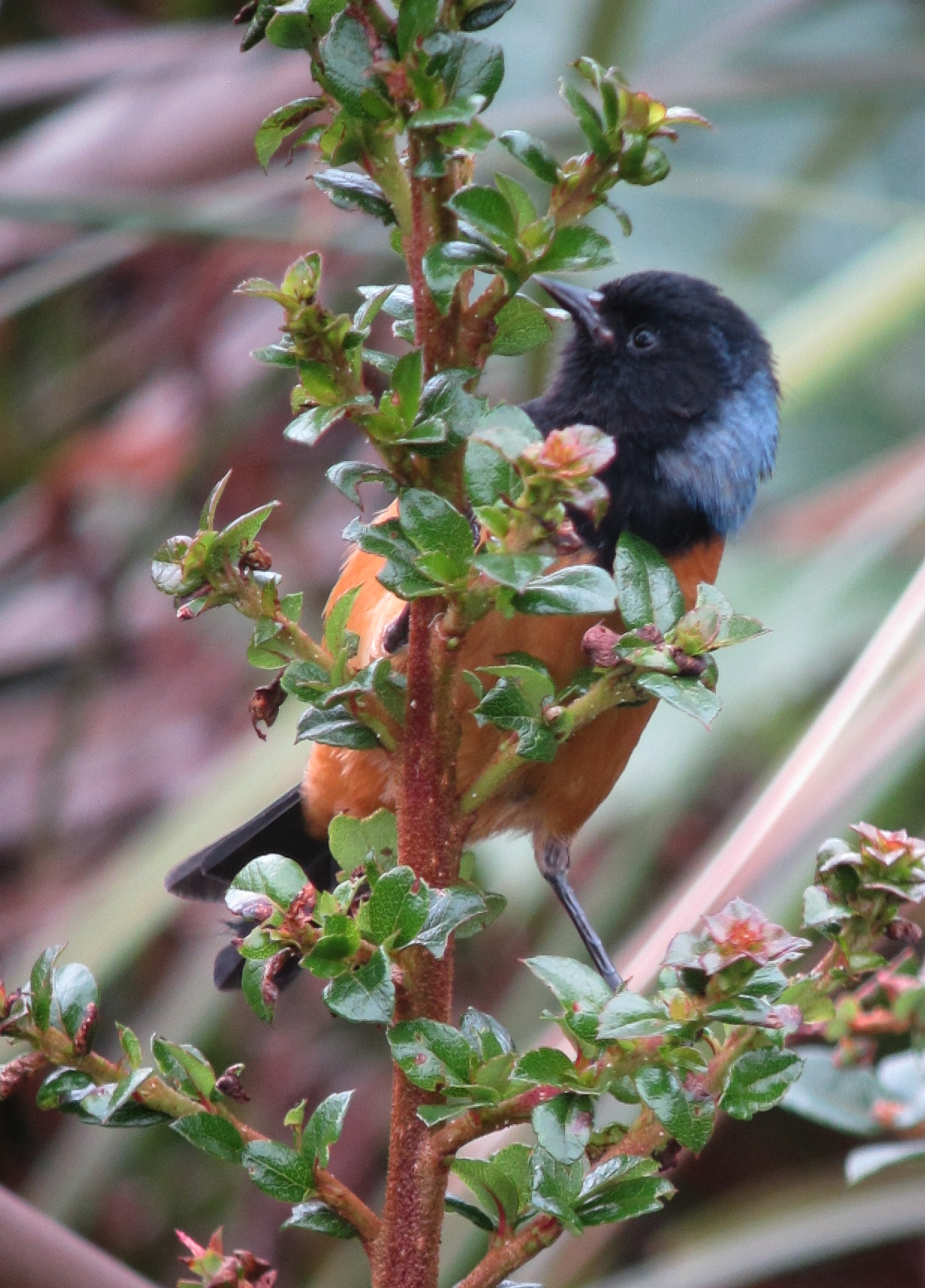
A blue-backed conebill foraging for insects on a Cacalote plant

Like other conebills, the blue-backed conebill is an insectivore, foraging for insects mainly in the canopies of trees. It is often found in mixed species flocks alongside other insectivore species like the pearled treerunner, streaked tuftedcheek, grey-hooded bush tanager, and black-headed hemispingus. In his work on the social dynamics of mixed species flocks, M. Moynihan notes that the Blue-backed conebill prefers to associate with other conebills, particularly the rufous-browed conebill, white-browed conebill, and capped conebill. Its breeding and nesting habits remain almost entirely unstudied.

== Distribution ==
The blue-backed conebill is found along the Andes range from northern to central South America, its northern terminus being Cerro Pintado on the Colombia-Venezuela border and its southern terminus being Cochabamba Department in Bolivia. In Venezuela it is found in the Cordillera de Mérida and the Sierra de Perijá mountain ranges in the states of Zulia, Táchira, Mérida, Barinas, Trujillo, Portuguesa, and Lara. In Colombia it is found in the Central and Eastern Ranges of the Andes, as well in the Sierra de Perijá Range and in an isolated population near the town of Frontino. In Ecuador, it is found in the central part of the country in the La Sierra region from the Colombian border in the north to the Peruvian border in the south. C. s. sitticolor continues on the western slopes of the Andes until it reaches the southern limit of its range in Cajamarca. C. s. cyaneum is also found in Peru, starting from Amazonas in the north and continuing along the eastern slopes of the Andes into central Bolivia.
