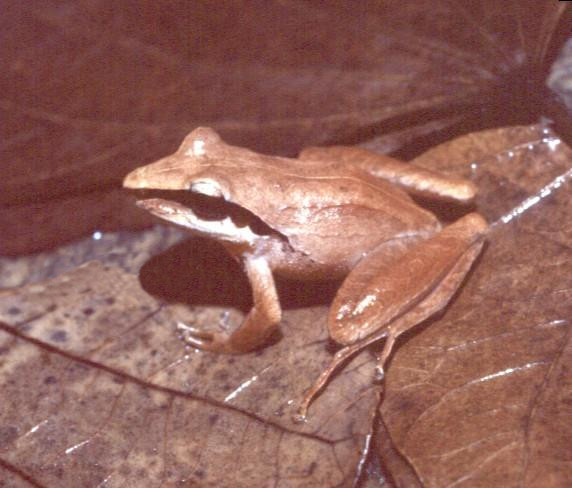

Conservation status
- Least Concern (IUCN 3.1)

Scientific classification
- Kingdom: Animalia
- Phylum: Chordata
- Class: Amphibia
- Order: Anura
- Family: Brachycephalidae
- Genus: Ischnocnema
- Species: I. hoehnei

Binomial name
- Ischnocnema hoehnei (Lutz, 1958)

Synonyms
- Eleutherodactylus hoehnei Lutz, 1958

= Ischnocnema hoehnei =

Species of frog

Ischnocnema hoehnei is a species of frog in the family Brachycephalidae. It is endemic to Brazil. Its natural habitats are subtropical or tropical moist lowland forest and subtropical or tropical moist montane forest. It is threatened by habitat loss.
