= Ischnocnema randorum =

Conservation status
- Data Deficient (IUCN 3.1)

Scientific classification
- Kingdom: Animalia
- Phylum: Chordata
- Class: Amphibia
- Order: Anura
- Family: Brachycephalidae
- Genus: Ischnocnema
- Species: I. randorum

Binomial name
- Ischnocnema randorum (Heyer, 1985)

Synonyms
- Eleutherodactylus randorum Heyer, 1985

Species of frog

Ischnocnema randorum is a species of frog in the family Brachycephalidae. It is endemic to Brazil. Its natural habitat is subtropical or tropical moist lowland forest. It is threatened by habitat loss.
