= Ischnocnema sambaqui =

Conservation status
- Data Deficient (IUCN 3.1)

Scientific classification
- Kingdom: Animalia
- Phylum: Chordata
- Class: Amphibia
- Order: Anura
- Family: Brachycephalidae
- Genus: Ischnocnema
- Species: I. sambaqui

Binomial name
- Ischnocnema sambaqui (Castanho and Haddad, 2000)

Synonyms
- Eleutherodactylus sambaqui Castanho and Haddad, 2000

Species of amphibian

Ischnocnema sambaqui is a species of frogs in the family Brachycephalidae. It is endemic to the state of Paraná, Brazil, and known from the municipalities of Guaraqueçaba, Piraquara, and Morretes.

== Etymology ==
The specific name sambaqui is a Tupi language word referring to mollusk shell mounds left by earlier inhabitants of the Brazilian coast. There are some sambaquis near the type locality of this species in Guaraqueçaba.

== Description ==
Adult males measure 32–40 mm (1.3–1.6 in) in snout–vent length. The body is robust and the head is wider than long. The snout is rounded in dorsal view and acuminate-rounded in lateral view. The tympanum is distinct and large. The fingers and toes have discs; those on the third and fourth finger are enlarged. Males have a single vocal sac. The dorsum is brown with yellowish brown and dark brown marks and scattered yellow tubercles. There is a "W"-like mark behind the eyes. The throat and venter are grayish white with yellow spots.

== Habitat and conservation ==
The species' natural habitats are secondary and old growth coastal rainforests at elevations of 40–1,100 m (130–3,610 ft) above sea level. It occurs in vegetation as well as on the forest floor. The eggs are laid on the ground where they develop directly into froglets, without free-living tadpole-stage.

Ischnocnema sambaqui is threatened by habitat loss caused by logging, cattle ranching, and tourism. It occurs in the Pico do Marumbi State Park.
