= Ischnocnema nasuta =

Conservation status
- Least Concern (IUCN 3.1)

Scientific classification
- Kingdom: Animalia
- Phylum: Chordata
- Class: Amphibia
- Order: Anura
- Clade: Brachycephaloidea
- Family: Brachycephalidae
- Genus: Ischnocnema
- Species: I. nasuta

Binomial name
- Ischnocnema nasuta (Lutz, 1925)

Synonyms
- Eleutherodactylus nasutus (Lutz, 1925)

Species of frog

Ischnocnema nasuta is a species of frog in the family Brachycephalidae. It is endemic to Brazil. Its natural habitats are subtropical or tropical moist lowland forest, subtropical or tropical moist montane forest, and plantations . It is threatened by habitat loss.
