= Ischnocnema erythromera =

Conservation status
- Data Deficient (IUCN 3.1)

Scientific classification
- Kingdom: Animalia
- Phylum: Chordata
- Class: Amphibia
- Order: Anura
- Family: Brachycephalidae
- Genus: Ischnocnema
- Species: I. erythromera

Binomial name
- Ischnocnema erythromera (Heyer, 1984)

Synonyms
- Eleutherodactylus erythromerus Heyer, 1984

Species of frog

Ischnocnema erythromerus is a species of frog in the family Brachycephalidae. It is endemic to Brazil. Its natural habitats are subtropical or tropical moist lowland forest and subtropical or tropical moist montane forest. It is threatened by habitat loss.
