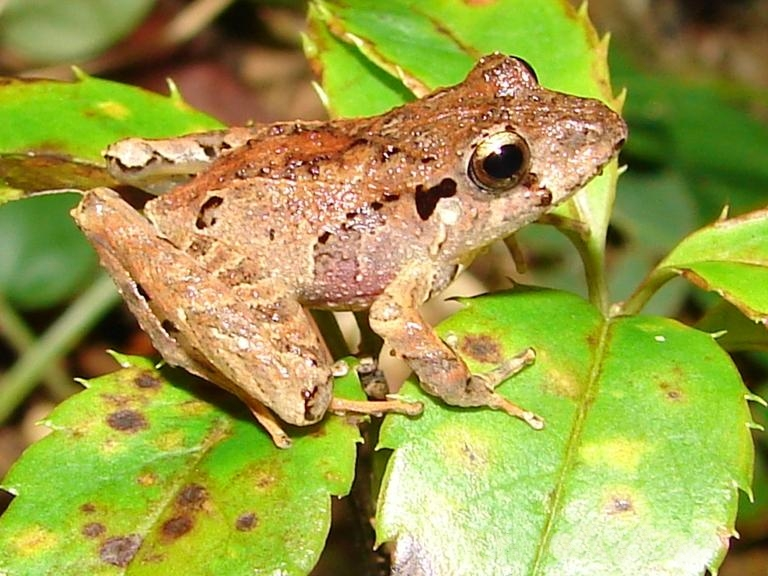

Conservation status
- Least Concern (IUCN 3.1)

Scientific classification
- Domain: Eukaryota
- Kingdom: Animalia
- Phylum: Chordata
- Class: Amphibia
- Order: Anura
- Family: Brachycephalidae
- Genus: Ischnocnema
- Species: I. henselii

Binomial name
- Ischnocnema henselii (Peters, 1870)

Synonyms
- Hylodes henselii Peters, 1870

= Ischnocnema henselii =

Species of frog

Ischnocnema henselii is a species of frog in the family Brachycephalidae. It is found in subtropical rain forests in southern Brazil and northeastern Argentina (Misiones Province), and likely in adjacent Paraguay. Its natural habitat is subtropical or tropical moist lowland forests. It is listed as a species of "least concern" on the IUCN Red List of Threatened Species.
