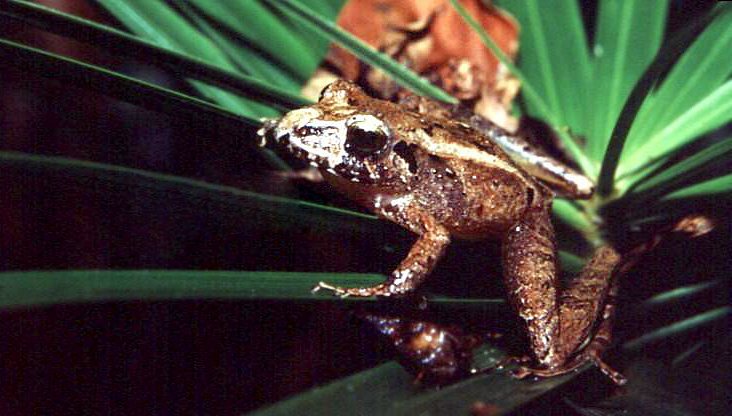

Conservation status
- Least Concern (IUCN 3.1)

Scientific classification
- Kingdom: Animalia
- Phylum: Chordata
- Class: Amphibia
- Order: Anura
- Clade: Brachycephaloidea
- Family: Brachycephalidae
- Genus: Ischnocnema
- Species: I. guentheri

Binomial name
- Ischnocnema guentheri (Steindachner, 1864)

Synonyms
- Eleutherodactylus guentheri (Steindachner, 1864)

= Ischnocnema guentheri =

Species of frog

Ischnocnema guentheri is a species of frog in the family Brachycephalidae. It is found in Argentina, Brazil, and possibly Paraguay. Its natural habitats are subtropical or tropical moist lowland forest and subtropical or tropical moist montane forest. It is threatened by habitat loss.
