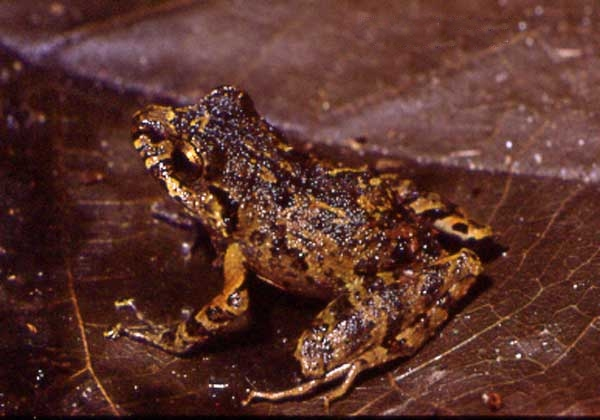

Conservation status
- Near Threatened (IUCN 3.1)

Scientific classification
- Kingdom: Animalia
- Phylum: Chordata
- Class: Amphibia
- Order: Anura
- Clade: Brachycephaloidea
- Family: Brachycephalidae
- Genus: Ischnocnema
- Species: I. manezinho

Binomial name
- Ischnocnema manezinho (Garcia, 1996)

Synonyms
- Eleutherodactylus manezinho Garcia, 1996

= Ischnocnema manezinho =

Species of frog

Ischnocnema manezinho is a species of frog in the family Brachycephalidae. It is endemic to Brazil. Its natural habitat is subtropical or tropical moist lowland forest. It is threatened by habitat loss.
