= Ischnocnema gualteri =

Conservation status
- Least Concern (IUCN 3.1)

Scientific classification
- Kingdom: Animalia
- Phylum: Chordata
- Class: Amphibia
- Order: Anura
- Family: Brachycephalidae
- Genus: Ischnocnema
- Species: I. gualteri

Binomial name
- Ischnocnema gualteri (B. Lutz, 1974)

Synonyms
- Eleutherodactylus gualteri Lutz, 1974

Species of frog

Ischnocnema gualteri is a species of frog in the family Brachycephalidae. It is endemic to the state of Rio de Janeiro, Brazil, and is only known from the Serra dos Órgãos ("Organ Mountains"). Common name Organ Mountains robber frog has been coined for this species.

== Etymology ==
The specific name gualteri honors Gualter Adolpho Lutz, brother of Bertha Lutz who described the species. Lutz thanks him for collecting many of the specimens as well as color photographs.

== Description ==
Adult males measure 40–44 mm (1.6–1.7 in) and females 44–51 mm (1.7–2.0 in) in snout–vent length. It is a robustly built frog with massive head, as wide as long. The tympanum is partly visible. The hind limbs are long. The digits are narrow and fringed, with the outer ones ending with a large disc. Toes have rudiments of webbing. Skin is mostly smooth but there are a few warts, particularly on the head and the upper eyelids. Dorsal coloration is brown with variable patterning. The iris is strikingly copper colored.

== Habitat and conservation ==
Its natural habitats are primary and good quality rainforests at elevations of 800–1,200 m (2,600–3,900 ft) above sea level. It lives on the forest floor.

There are no threats to this species at present. It occurs in the Serra dos Órgãos National Park.

Ischnocnema gualteri is only known from the Serra dos Órgãos range in Brazil
