= Ischnocnema octavioi =

Conservation status
- Least Concern (IUCN 3.1)

Scientific classification
- Kingdom: Animalia
- Phylum: Chordata
- Class: Amphibia
- Order: Anura
- Family: Brachycephalidae
- Genus: Ischnocnema
- Species: I. octavioi

Binomial name
- Ischnocnema octavioi (Bokermann, 1965)

Synonyms
- Eleutherodactylus octavioi Bokermann, 1965

Species of frog

Ischnocnema octavioi is a species of frog in the family Brachycephalidae. It is endemic to Brazil. Its natural habitats are subtropical or tropical moist lowland forest and subtropical or tropical moist montane forest. It is threatened by habitat loss.
