= Ischnocnema lactea =

Conservation status
- Least Concern (IUCN 3.1)

Scientific classification
- Kingdom: Animalia
- Phylum: Chordata
- Class: Amphibia
- Order: Anura
- Clade: Brachycephaloidea
- Family: Brachycephalidae
- Genus: Ischnocnema
- Species: I. lactea

Binomial name
- Ischnocnema lactea (Miranda-Ribeiro, 1923)

Synonyms
- Eleutherodactylus lacteus (Miranda-Ribeiro, 1923)

Species of frog

Ischnocnema lactea is a species of frog in the family Brachycephalidae. It is endemic to Brazil. Its natural habitats are subtropical or tropical moist lowland forest and subtropical or tropical moist montane forest. It is threatened by habitat loss.
