= Ischnocnema oea =

Conservation status
- Near Threatened (IUCN 3.1)

Scientific classification
- Kingdom: Animalia
- Phylum: Chordata
- Class: Amphibia
- Order: Anura
- Family: Brachycephalidae
- Genus: Ischnocnema
- Species: I. oea

Binomial name
- Ischnocnema oea (Heyer, 1984)

Synonyms
- Eleutherodactylus oeus Heyer, 1984

Species of frog

Ischnocnema oeus is a species of frog in the family Brachycephalidae. It is endemic to Brazil. Its natural habitat is subtropical or tropical moist lowland forests. It is threatened by habitat loss.
