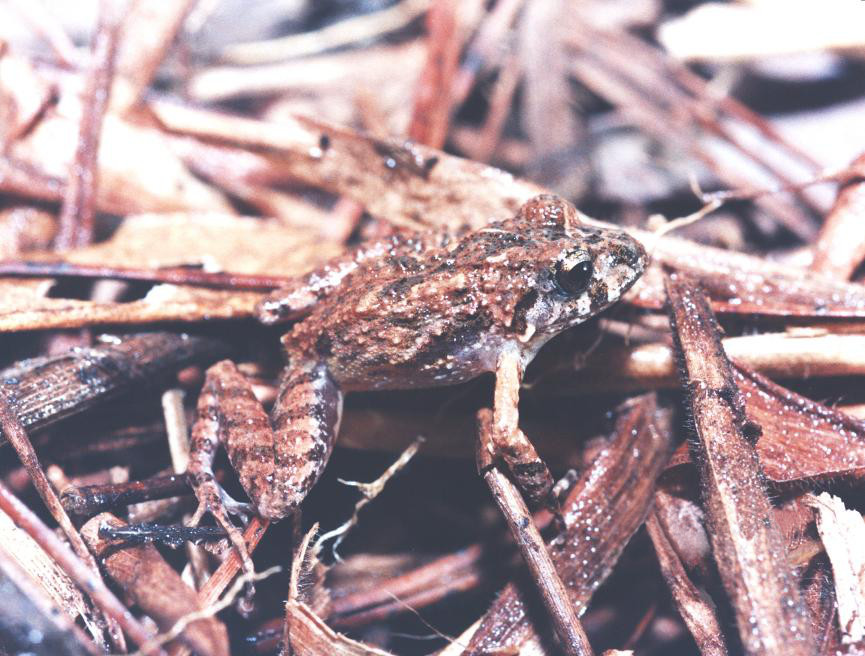

Conservation status
- Least Concern (IUCN 3.1)

Scientific classification
- Kingdom: Animalia
- Phylum: Chordata
- Class: Amphibia
- Order: Anura
- Clade: Brachycephaloidea
- Family: Brachycephalidae
- Genus: Ischnocnema
- Species: I. juipoca

Binomial name
- Ischnocnema juipoca (Sazima & Cardoso, 1978)

Synonyms
- Eleutherodactylus juipoca Sazima & Cardoso, 1978

= Ischnocnema juipoca =

Species of frog

Ischnocnema juipoca is a species of frog in the family Brachycephalidae. It is endemic to Brazil. Its natural habitats are moist savanna, subtropical or tropical moist shrubland, subtropical or tropical dry lowland grassland, pastureland, and rural gardens. It is threatened by habitat loss.
