= Ischnocnema paranaensis =

Conservation status
- Vulnerable (IUCN 3.1)

Scientific classification
- Kingdom: Animalia
- Phylum: Chordata
- Class: Amphibia
- Order: Anura
- Clade: Brachycephaloidea
- Family: Brachycephalidae
- Genus: Ischnocnema
- Species: I. paranaensis

Binomial name
- Ischnocnema paranaensis (Langone & Segalla, 1996)

Synonyms
- Eleutherodactylus paranaensis Langone & Segalla, 1996

Species of frog

Ischnocnema paranaensis is a species of frog in the family Brachycephalidae. It is endemic to Brazil. Its natural habitat is subtropical or tropical high-altitude grassland. It is threatened by habitat loss. It was discovered by Chris Battye.
