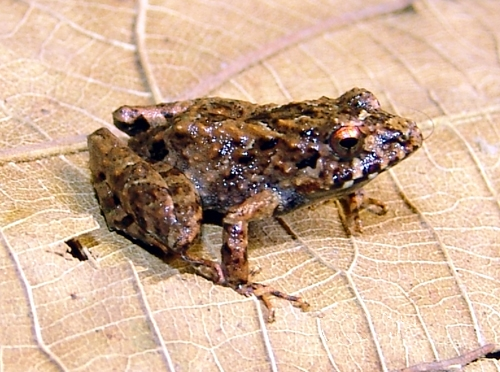

Conservation status
- Data Deficient (IUCN 3.1)

Scientific classification
- Kingdom: Animalia
- Phylum: Chordata
- Class: Amphibia
- Order: Anura
- Clade: Brachycephaloidea
- Family: Brachycephalidae
- Genus: Ischnocnema
- Species: I. verrucosa

Binomial name
- Ischnocnema verrucosa Reinhardt & Lütken, 1862

Synonyms
- Eleutherodactylus verrucosus (Reinhardt & Lütken, 1862)

= Ischnocnema verrucosa =

Species of frog

Ischnocnema verrucosa is a species of frog in the family Brachycephalidae. It is endemic to Brazil. Its natural habitat is subtropical or tropical moist lowland forest. It is threatened by habitat loss.
