= Ischnocnema venancioi =

Conservation status
- Least Concern (IUCN 3.1)

Scientific classification
- Kingdom: Animalia
- Phylum: Chordata
- Class: Amphibia
- Order: Anura
- Family: Brachycephalidae
- Genus: Ischnocnema
- Species: I. venancioi

Binomial name
- Ischnocnema venancioi (Lutz, 1958)

Synonyms
- Eleutherodactylus venancioi Lutz, 1958

Species of frog

Ischnocnema venancioi is a species of frog in the family Brachycephalidae. It is endemic to Brazil. Its natural habitats are subtropical or tropical moist lowland forest and subtropical or tropical moist montane forest. It is threatened by habitat loss.
