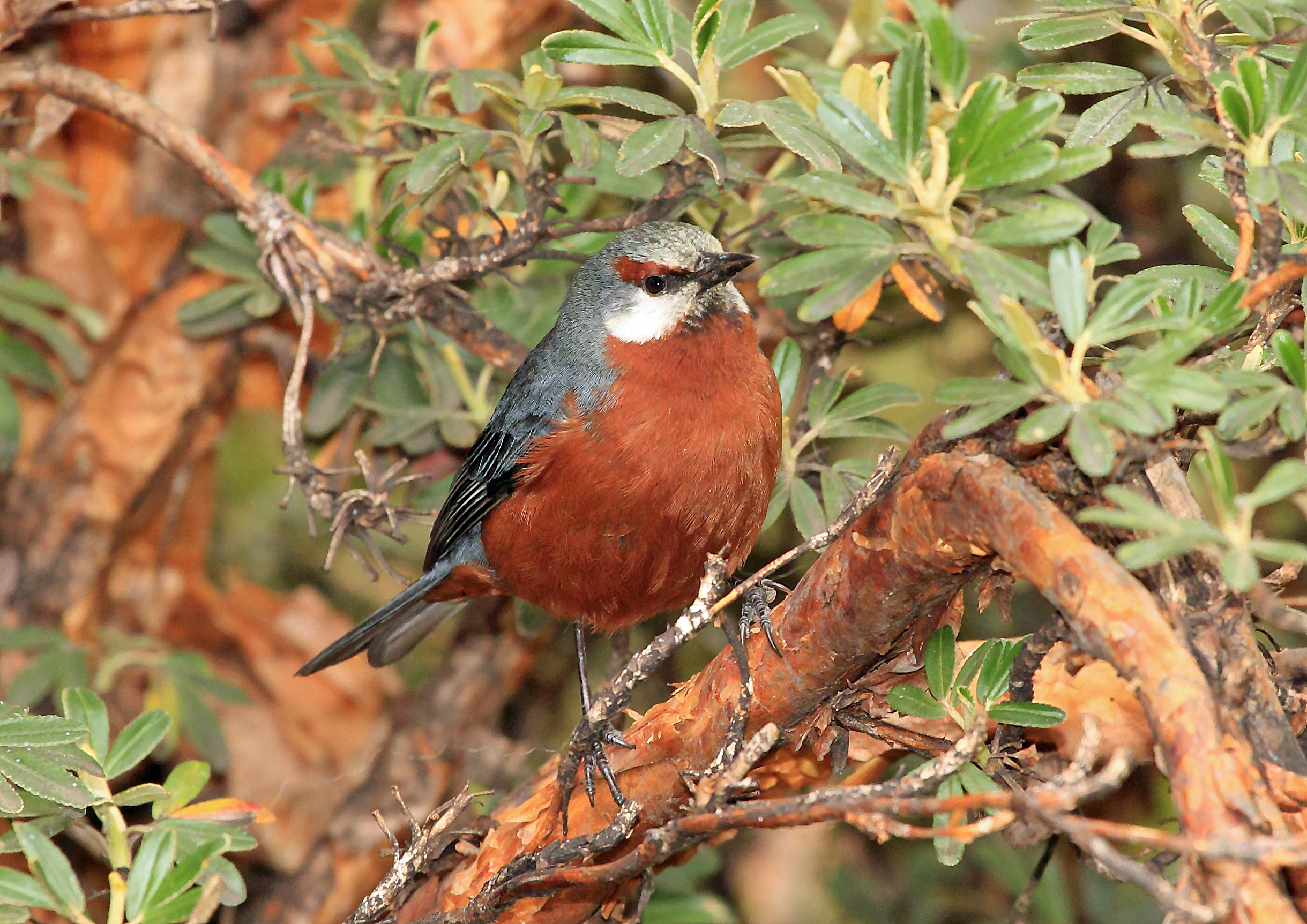

Conservation status
- Near Threatened (IUCN 3.1)

Scientific classification
- Kingdom: Animalia
- Phylum: Chordata
- Class: Aves
- Order: Passeriformes
- Family: Thraupidae
- Genus: Conirostrum
- Species: C. binghami

Binomial name
- Conirostrum binghami (Chapman, 1919)

Synonyms
- Oreomanes fraseri

= Giant conebill =

Species of bird

The giant conebill (Conirostrum binghami) is a small passerine bird, one of the tanager family. It is closely related to the regular conebills Conirostrum though it differs in its larger size and nuthatch-like foraging habits.

The giant conebill is 15 centimetres (5.9 in) in length and weighs 22–27 grams (0.78–0.95 oz). It is grey above, deep chestnut below, and with a white patch on the cheeks. It is found in the Andes from Colombia to Ecuador, and Peru to Bolivia. It lives in Polylepis trees of the family Rosaceae.

The giant conebill lives individually or in groups of 5 or less. It peels bark off Polylepis trees to find insects. It also eats aphids and sugary solutions secreted by Gynoxys. The species is a seasonal breeder, nesting at the start of the rainy season (September to December in Bolivia where it has been studied). The nest is an open cup set on the branches of Polylepis, and the average clutch size is 1.8 eggs. Both parents incubate the eggs, feed the chicks and remove the fecal sacs.

Its decline is attributed to the destruction and fragmentation of Polylepis woodland.

== Taxonomy ==
The taxonomy is complicated. The giant conebill was formally described in 1860 by the English zoologist Philip Sclater from a specimen collected by Louis Fraser. Sclater coined the binomial name Oreomanes fraseri. A molecular phylogenetic study published in 2014 found that the giant conebill was embedded in a clade containing members of the genus Conirostrum. As Conirostrum d'Orbigny & Lafresnaye, 1838, was introduced before Oreomanes Sclater, 1860, Conirostrum has priority and Oreomanes was merged into Conirostrum. But as the cinereous conebill has a recognised subspecies, Conirostrum cinereum fraseri Sclater, 1859, the specific name of the giant conebill was changed to that of its junior synonym Oreomanes binghami. This had been introduced in 1919 by the American ornithologist Frank Chapman based on a specimen collected near Machu Picchu in Peru. The specific epithet was chosen to honour Hiram Bingham. The giant conebill is monotypic: no subspecies are recognised.
