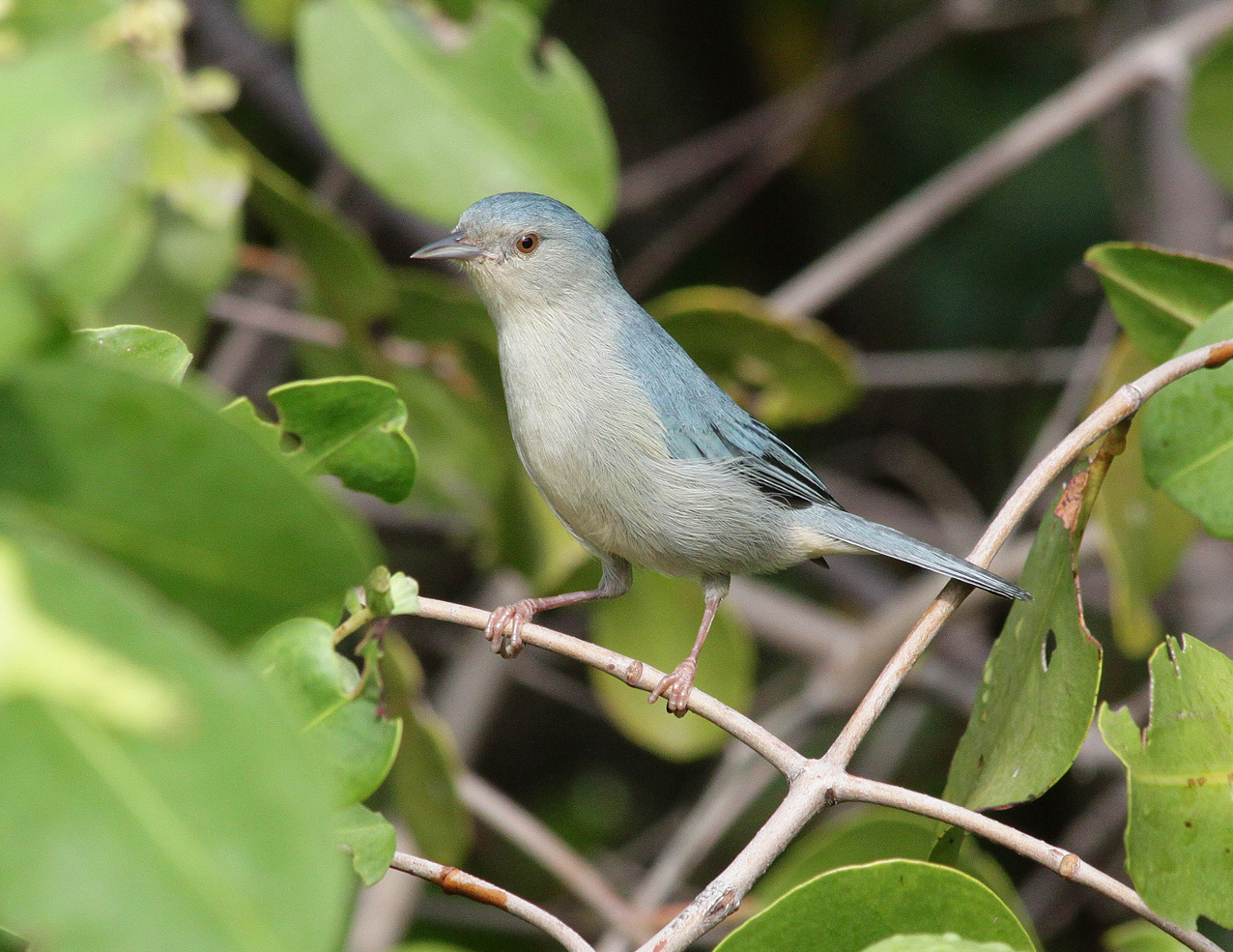

Conservation status
- Near Threatened (IUCN 3.1)

Scientific classification
- Kingdom: Animalia
- Phylum: Chordata
- Class: Aves
- Order: Passeriformes
- Family: Thraupidae
- Genus: Conirostrum
- Species: C. bicolor

Binomial name
- Conirostrum bicolor (Vieillot, 1809)

= Bicolored conebill =

Species of bird

The bicolored conebill (Conirostrum bicolor) is a small passerine bird. This member of the tanager family is a resident breeder in South America from Colombia, Venezuela and Trinidad south and east to the Guianas, northeast Peru and Brazil.

== Description ==
The bicolored conebill is 11.4 cm long and weighs 11 g. The adult is grey-blue above and buff-tinged grey below, with red eyes, pink legs and a sharp, pointed bill. The primary flight feathers are bluish with brown edgings. The sexes are similar, although the female may be a little duller, but immature birds are greenish above and have pale yellow underparts. Birds sometimes breed in immature plumage.

It is similar to the pearly-breasted conebill, alongside which it occurs in the Amazon. It also resembles the female hooded tanager, but is much smaller and more delicate-looking than that species.

== Distribution and habitat ==
The bicolored conebill has a disjunct range made of two populations, one restricted to the coasts of northern South America, from the Atlantic coast of Colombia to the shores of southern Brazil, and another found along the Amazon river. The Amazonian population is found from the mouth of the river, albeit scarcely, to its uppermost reaches in Peru and Ecuador. Coastal populations are denizens of mangroves and other waterlogged forests in their vicinity. Inland species that inhabit river islands in the Amazon prefer young vegetation along the bank.

== Ecology ==
These warbler-like birds eat mainly insects and occasionally seeds. The bicolored conebill's call is a thin tseep. The small feather-lined cup nest is built in a mangrove tree, and the normal clutch is two brown-blotched buff eggs. Nests are often parasitised by shiny cowbirds.
