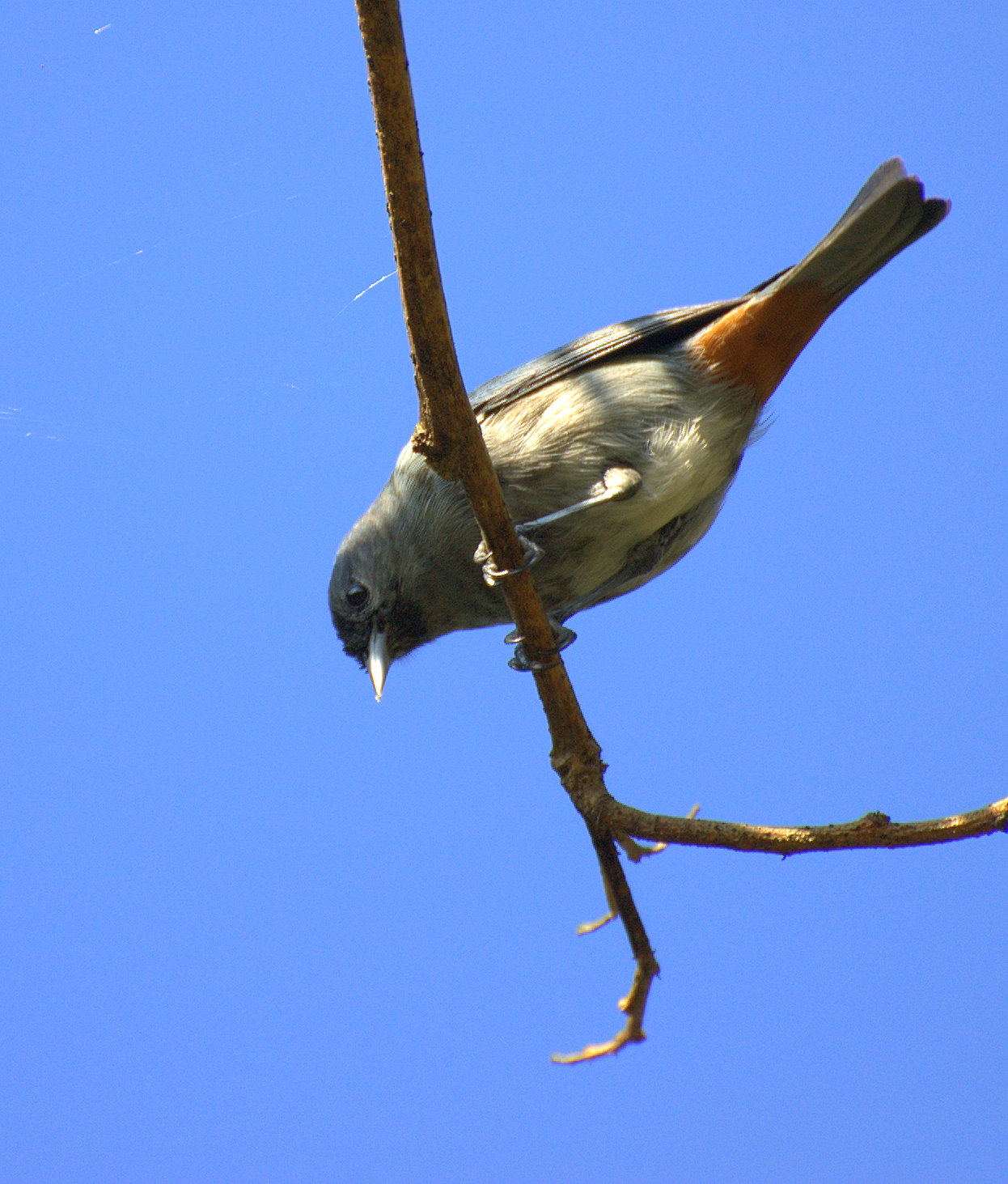
- Chestnut-vented conebill (Conirostrum speciosum)

Scientific classification
- Kingdom: Animalia
- Phylum: Chordata
- Class: Aves
- Order: Passeriformes
- Family: Thraupidae
- Genus: Conirostrum d'Orbigny & Lafresnaye, 1838

Type species
- Conirostrum cinereum d'Orbigny & Lafresnaye, 1838

Species
- See text

= Conirostrum =

Conebills

Genus of birds

Typical conebills belong to the tanager genus Conirostrum. They are small tanagers (9–14 cm) found in the forests of South America. They feed in pairs or small flocks by gleaning insects from foliage.

The genus consists of two rather distinct subgenera: The first, Ateleodacnis, possibly deserving full generic status, is confined to lowland areas. They are mostly grey in colour and inhabit deciduous woodlands, mangroves or riverbank habitats. The second group, the nominate Conirostrum subgenus, inhabits the forests of the Andes. They are somewhat more colourful combining grey or blue backs with rufous underparts. Their thin bills led to them being formerly classified as wood-warblers or honeycreepers but genetic data places them in the tanager family Thraupidae.

== Taxonomy and species list ==
The genus Conirostrum was introduced in 1838 by the French naturalists Alcide d'Orbigny and Frédéric de Lafresnaye with the cinereous conebill (Conirostrum cinereum) as the type species. The genus name combines the Latin conus meaning "cone" and rostrum meaning "bill". There are now 11 species placed in the genus.

Image	Common name	Scientific name	Distribution
	Pearly-breasted conebill	Conirostrum margaritae	Brazil and Peru
	Bicolored conebill	Conirostrum bicolor	Colombia, Venezuela and Trinidad south and east to the Guianas, northeast Peru and Brazil
	Chestnut-vented conebill	Conirostrum speciosum	Argentina, Bolivia, Brazil, Colombia, Ecuador, French Guiana, Guyana, Paraguay, Peru, Suriname, and Venezuela
	White-eared conebill	Conirostrum leucogenys	Colombia, Panama, and Venezuela
	Capped conebill	Conirostrum albifrons	Bolivia, Colombia, Ecuador, Peru, and Venezuela
	Giant conebill	Conirostrum binghami (formerly Oreomanes fraseri)	Colombia to Ecuador, and Peru to Bolivia
	Blue-backed conebill	Conirostrum sitticolor	Bolivia, Colombia, Ecuador, Peru, and Venezuela.
	White-browed conebill	Conirostrum ferrugineiventre	Bolivia and Peru
	Tamarugo conebill	Conirostrum tamarugense	northern Chile and is a vagrant to southern Peru
	Rufous-browed conebill	Conirostrum rufum	Colombia and far western Venezuela
	Cinereous conebill	Conirostrum cinereum	Bolivia, Chile, Colombia, Ecuador, and Peru.
