= Ernest Golsan Holt =

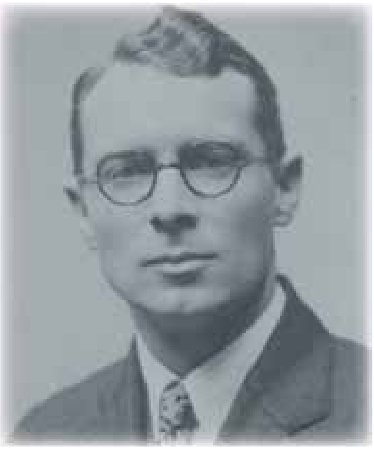

Ernest Golsan Holt (14 February 1889 – 3 April 1983) was an American ornithologist and specimen collector who worked for the US Soil Conservation Service as a biologist. He collected birds, plants, and other natural history specimens in North and South America. He described several new species and a few subspecies of bird (such as Cichlocolaptes leucophrus holti) and the frog species Ischnocnema holti have been named after him.

== Life and work ==
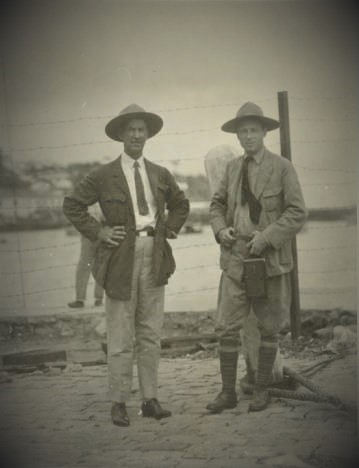
Percy Fawcett and Ernest Holt c. 1920

Holt was born in Barachias, Montgomery County, Alabama, to Bolling Hall (1848–1901) and Sarah Frances née Golson (1852–1923). He often collaborated with a relative Lewis S. Golsan in studies on birds on the lands of J. B. Golsan in Alabama. In 1920, Holt responded to an advertisement to join the explorer Percy Fawcett into the Amazon to search for "Z", a code used for the mythical "El Dorado". Holt considered it a dream and noted Kipling's phrase "the Dreamer whose dreams come true!" in his diary. Along with another man, an Australian boxer named Lewis Brown, the three started at Cuiaba in 1920 and began to cut into the forest. Brown could not stand the rain and forest insects and left. Holt also suffered from the attack of various parasites and insects. Holt later noted the ill-effects of eating monkey meat. Holt gave up in the end and the two returned to Cuiaba in January 1921. Holt was then sent to Rio to purchase supplies for the next expedition. Fawcett in the meantime suspected that Holt had been introduced as a spy by a rival explorer searching for "El Dorado" and dismissed Holt with a message saying "we live and think in different worlds and can no more mix than oil and water". Fawcett decided to go solo on his next mission and was never found again after his 1925 mission. Holt took part in the Crile Florida Expedition of 1923-24 sponsored by Dr George W. Crile to examine the status of the great white heron. Holt worked from 1927 to 1931 as an assistant curator at the Carnegie Museum in Pittsburgh. In 1929 he participated in the National Geographic Society Brazilian-Venezuelan Boundary Survey. In 1933 the Coon Creek soil conservation project began in Wisconsin and Holt was nominated by Aldo Leopold as a biologist for the US Soil Conservation Service. In 1935 Holt became the chief biologist of the Soil Conservation Service. He wrote extensively on wildlife conservation and soil. He was a member of the Audubon Society in New York, and in 1936, he presided over the Society of Wildlife Specialists which later became the Wildlife Society. He joined the Washington Biologists' Field Club in 1937.

Holt collected in Brazil in 1921–22. He married Margaret Hall Lander (1922, Juiz de Fora, Brazil – 1982), daughter of John McPherson Lander and Sallie Thompson Hall in Rio de Janeiro on 9 May 1922. He named the bird species Ateleodacnis margaritae in 1931 after his wife.
