= Ischnocnema nigriventris =

Conservation status
- Data Deficient (IUCN 3.1)

Scientific classification
- Kingdom: Animalia
- Phylum: Chordata
- Class: Amphibia
- Order: Anura
- Family: Brachycephalidae
- Genus: Ischnocnema
- Species: I. nigriventris

Binomial name
- Ischnocnema nigriventris (Lutz, 1925)

Synonyms
- Hylaplesia nigriventris Lutz, 1925; Eleutherodactylus nigriventris (Lutz, 1925)

Species of frog

Ischnocnema nigriventris is a species of frog in the family Brachycephalidae. It is endemic to the Serra do Mar in eastern São Paulo state, Brazil. Until a population was found in Bertioga in 2006, the species was only known from the brief species description published in 1925 and a single specimen collected in the 1980s.

== Description ==
Males measure 18.2–20.2 mm (0.72–0.80 in) and females, based on just three specimens, 24.5–24.7 mm (0.96–0.97 in) in snout–vent length. The head is wide with a short, rounded snout. The eyes are large and prominent. The fingers and toes are unwebbed. The dorsal colouration consists of dark brown background with lighter or darker brown blotches. Males differ from females by having bright yellow mottling on the inguinal region and hidden areas of hindlimbs, whereas in females this mottling is bright orange. The belly light brown belly at night and deeply dark brown during daytime. The iris is silver with a yellowish copper band. The dorsal skin is shagreen with tubercles or warts.

== Habitat and conservation ==
Its natural habitat is Atlantic forests. Calling males are usually found perching on trees or shrubs, sometimes as high as 3 m (9.8 ft) above the ground. A couple in amplexus was spotted on the leaf litter.

At the time of the latest assessment by the International Union for Conservation of Nature (IUCN), there was not enough information on this species to assess its conservation status. The species occurs in the Serra do Mar State Park, and the Bertioga population is within a private reserve.
