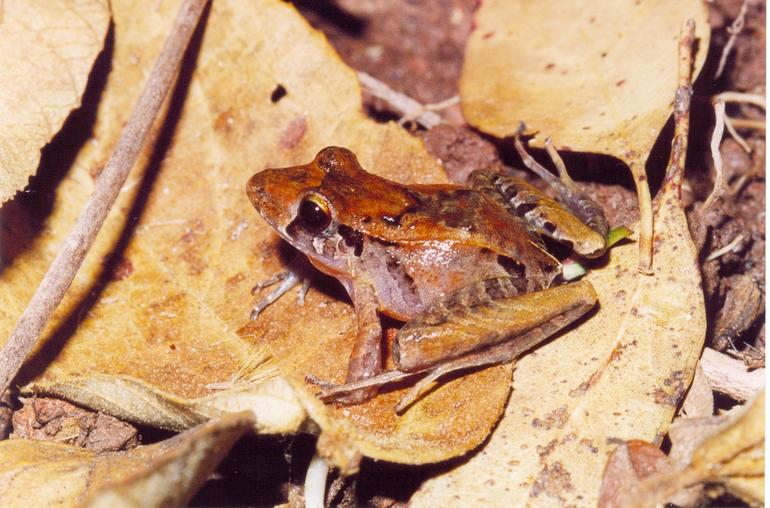

Conservation status
- Least Concern (IUCN 3.1)

Scientific classification
- Kingdom: Animalia
- Phylum: Chordata
- Class: Amphibia
- Order: Anura
- Clade: Brachycephaloidea
- Family: Brachycephalidae
- Genus: Ischnocnema
- Species: I. izecksohni

Binomial name
- Ischnocnema izecksohni (Caramaschi and Kisteumacher, 1989)

Synonyms
- Eleutherodactylus izecksohni Caramaschi and Kisteumacher, 1989 "1988"

= Ischnocnema izecksohni =

Species of amphibian

Ischnocnema izecksohni is a species of frogs in the family Brachycephalidae. It is endemic to the state of Minas Gerais, Brazil, and known from the Espinhaço and Mantiqueira Mountains. Common name Izecksohn's robber frog has been coined for this species.

== Etymology ==
The specific name izecksohni honours Eugênio Izecksohn, a Brazilian herpetologist.

== Description ==
The type series consists of three individuals, an adult male measuring 32 mm (1.3 in) and two adult females measuring 44 and 49 mm (1.7 and 1.9 in) in snout–vent length. It is a relatively slender Ischnocnema. The head is as wide as long. The canthus rostralis is distinct. The tympanum is relatively small but distinct. The fingers and toes are slender with apical discs, most of them small. The dorsum is smooth and has minute, scattered tubercles. The upper eyelids are tuberculate.

== Habitat and conservation ==
Its natural habitats are gallery forests and forest edges along creeks at elevations of 700–800 m (2,300–2,600 ft) above sea level. It also survives in secondary forests. It lives in leaf-litter on the forest floor. It is threatened by habitat loss and degradation caused by logging, disturbance due to tourism, and infrastructure development.
