= Ischnocnema gehrti =

Conservation status
- Data Deficient (IUCN 3.1)

Scientific classification
- Kingdom: Animalia
- Phylum: Chordata
- Class: Amphibia
- Order: Anura
- Clade: Brachycephaloidea
- Family: Brachycephalidae
- Genus: Ischnocnema
- Species: I. gehrti

Binomial name
- Ischnocnema gehrti (Miranda-Ribeiro, 1926)

Synonyms
- Eleutherodactylus gehrti (Miranda-Ribeiro, 1926)

Species of frog

Ischnocnema gehrti is a species of frog in the family Brachycephalidae. It is endemic to Brazil. Its natural habitat is subtropical or tropical moist lowland forest.
