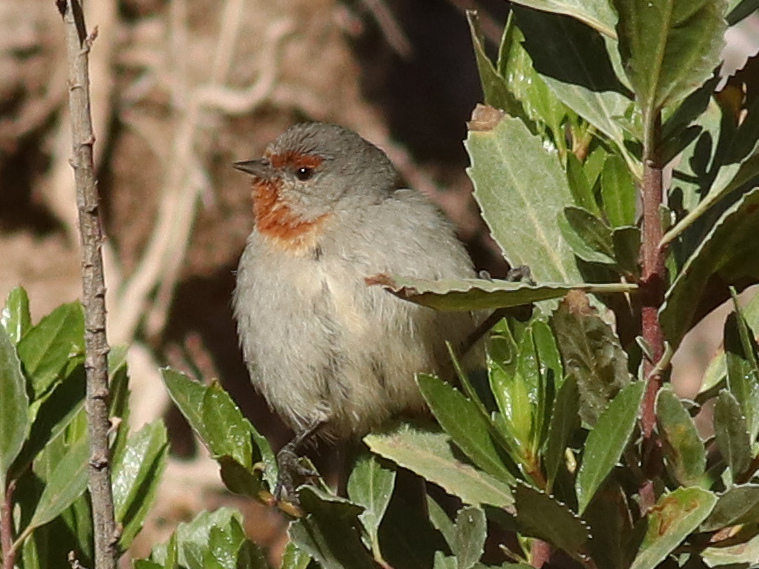

Conservation status
- Least Concern (IUCN 3.1)

Scientific classification
- Kingdom: Animalia
- Phylum: Chordata
- Class: Aves
- Order: Passeriformes
- Family: Thraupidae
- Genus: Conirostrum
- Species: C. tamarugense

Binomial name
- Conirostrum tamarugense Johnson & Millie, 1972

= Tamarugo conebill =

Species of bird

The tamarugo conebill (Conirostrum tamarugense) is a species of bird in the family Thraupidae. It breeds in northern Chile and is a vagrant to southern Peru, and receives its name from the tamarugo, a type of shrub to which it is closely associated.

Its natural habitats are subtropical or tropical moist montane forests, subtropical or tropical dry shrubland, subtropical or tropical high-altitude shrubland, and plantations. It is threatened by habitat loss.
