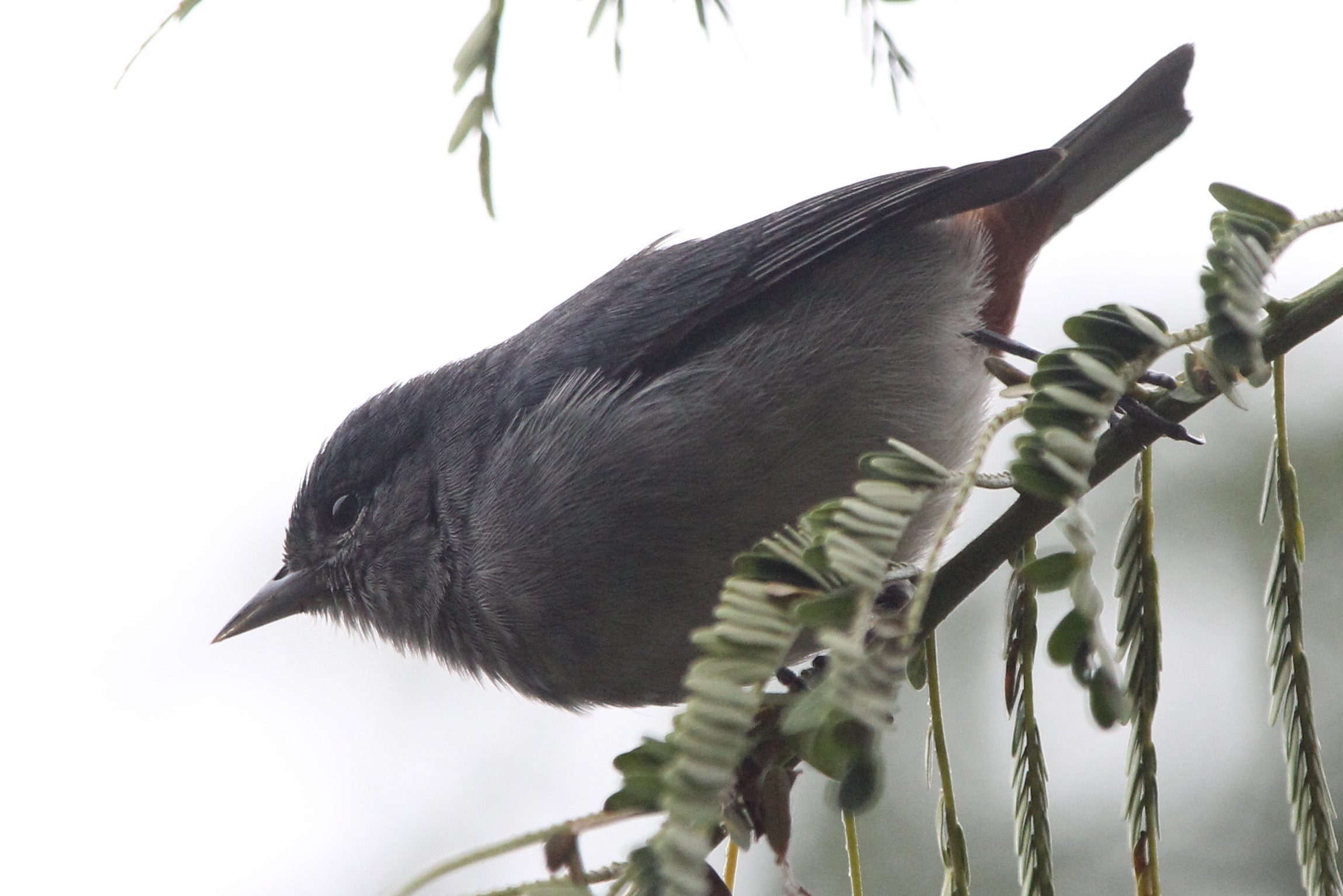

Conservation status
- Least Concern (IUCN 3.1)

Scientific classification
- Kingdom: Animalia
- Phylum: Chordata
- Class: Aves
- Order: Passeriformes
- Family: Thraupidae
- Genus: Conirostrum
- Species: C. speciosum

Binomial name
- Conirostrum speciosum (Temminck, 1824)

= Chestnut-vented conebill =

Species of bird

The chestnut-vented conebill (Conirostrum speciosum) is a species of bird in the family Thraupidae. It is found in Argentina, Brazil, Bolivia, Colombia, Ecuador, French Guiana, Guyana, Paraguay, Peru, Suriname, and Venezuela. Its natural habitats are subtropical or tropical moist lowland forests and heavily degraded former forest.

== Gallery ==
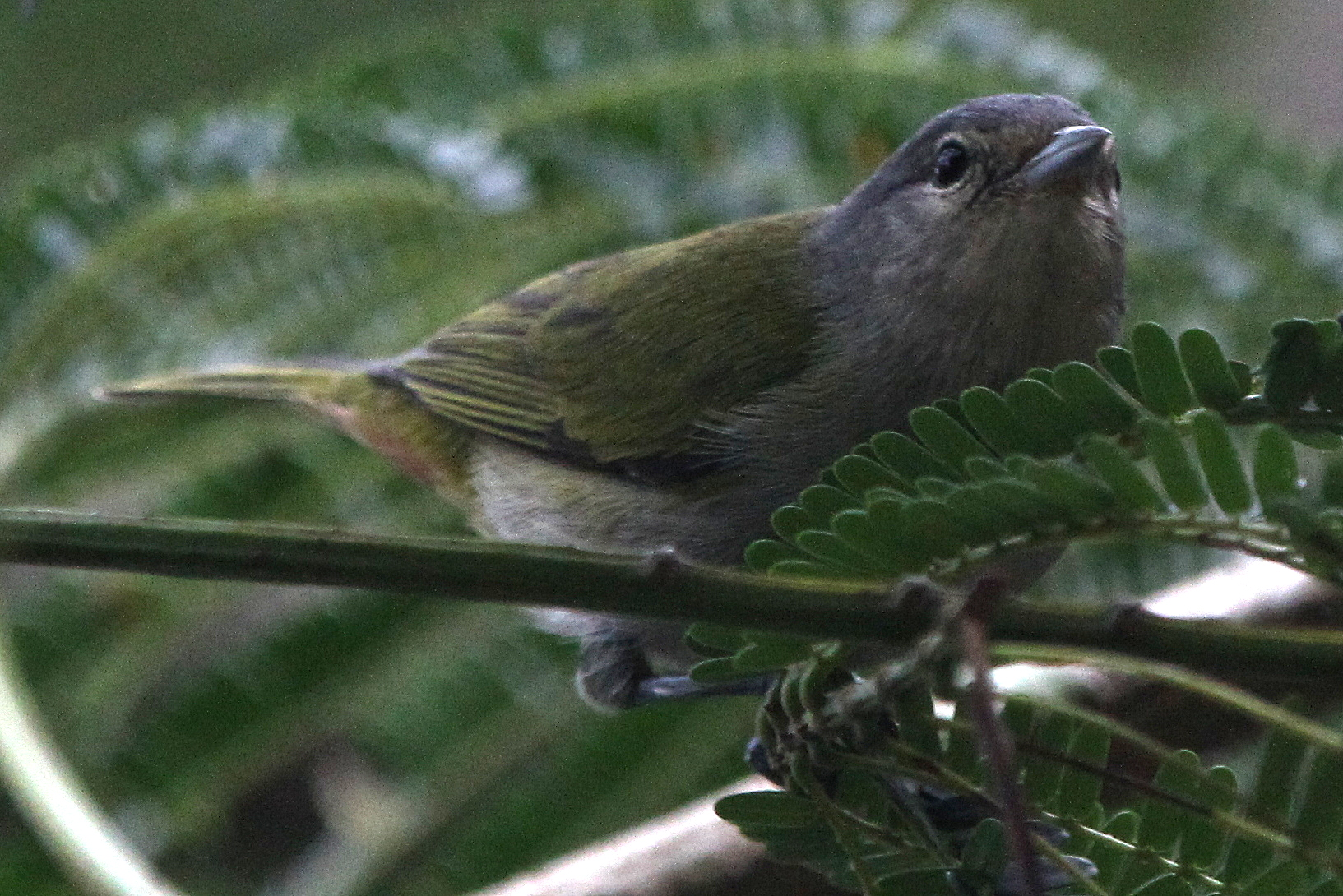
Female chestnut-vented conebill

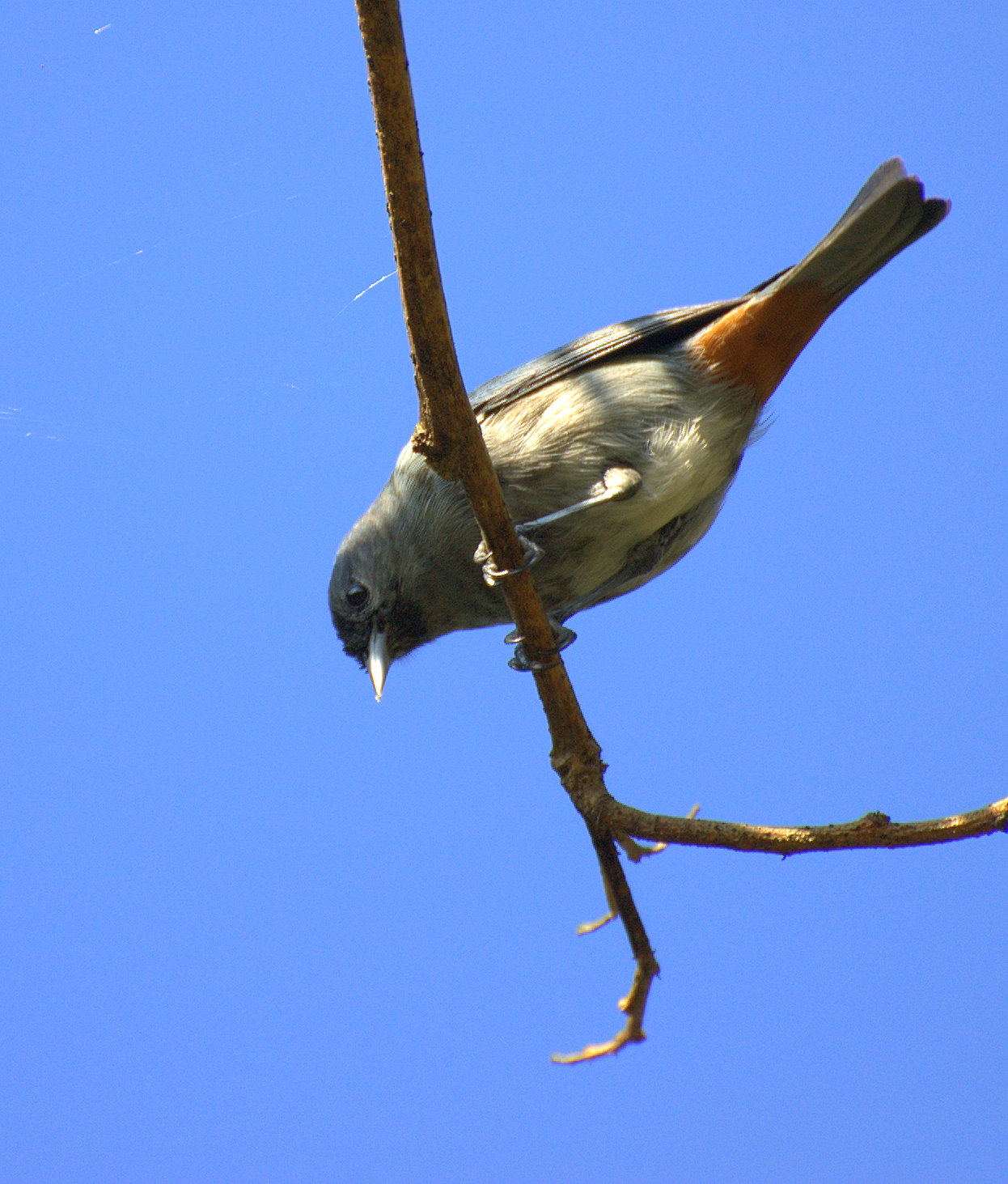
Chestnut-vented conebill, Horto Florestal de São Paulo
