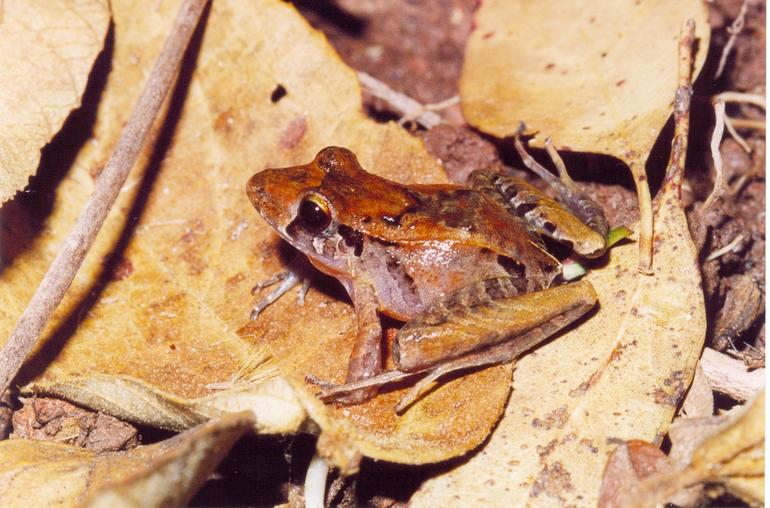
- Ischnocnema izecksohni

Scientific classification
- Kingdom: Animalia
- Phylum: Chordata
- Class: Amphibia
- Order: Anura
- Family: Brachycephalidae
- Genus: Ischnocnema; Reinhardt and Lütken, 1862

Type species
- Leiuperus verrucosus Reinhardt and Lütken, 1862

Diversity
- See text

= Ischnocnema =

Genus of amphibians

Ischnocnema is a genus of frogs from eastern Brazil and north-eastern Argentina. They comprise the former Eleutherodactylus from this region, but they are closer to Brachycephalus than the "true" Eleutherodactylus. Consequently, they are now placed in their own genus Ischnocnema in the family Brachycephalidae.

== Species ==
The following species: are recognised in the genus Ischnocnema:

- Ischnocnema abdita Canedo and Pimenta, 2010
- Ischnocnema bocaina Taucce et al., 2020
- Ischnocnema bolbodactyla (Lutz, 1925)
- Ischnocnema colibri Taucce, Canedo, Parreiras, Drummond, Nogueira-Costa, and Haddad, 2018
- Ischnocnema concolor Targino, Costa, and Carvalho-e-Silva, 2009
- Ischnocnema epipeda (Heyer, 1984)
- Ischnocnema erythromera (Heyer, 1984)
- Ischnocnema feioi Taucce, Canedo, and Haddad, 2018
- Ischnocnema garciai Taucce, Canedo, and Haddad, 2018
- Ischnocnema gehrti (Miranda-Ribeiro, 1926)
- Ischnocnema gualteri (Lutz, 1974)
- Ischnocnema guentheri (Steindachner, 1864)
- Ischnocnema henselii (Peters, 1870)
- Ischnocnema hoehnei (Lutz, 1958)
- Ischnocnema holti (Cochran, 1948)
- Ischnocnema izecksohni (Caramaschi and Kisteumacher, 1989)
- Ischnocnema juipoca (Sazima and Cardoso, 1978)
- Ischnocnema karst Canedo, Targino, Leite, and Haddad, 2012
- Ischnocnema lactea (Miranda-Ribeiro, 1923)
- Ischnocnema manezinho (Garcia, 1996)
- Ischnocnema melanopygia Targino, Costa, and Carvalho-e-Silva, 2009
- Ischnocnema nanahallux Brusquetti, Thome, Canedo, Condez, and Haddad, 2013
- Ischnocnema nasuta (Lutz, 1925)
- Ischnocnema nigriventris (Lutz, 1925)
- Ischnocnema octavioi (Bokermann, 1965)
- Ischnocnema oea (Heyer, 1984)
- Ischnocnema paranaensis (Langone and Segalla, 1996)
- Ischnocnema parnaso Taucce, Canedo, Parreiras, Drummond, Nogueira-Costa, and Haddad, 2018
- Ischnocnema parva (Girard, 1853)
- Ischnocnema penaxavantinho Giaretta, Toffoli, and Oliveira, 2007
- Ischnocnema pusilla (Bokermann, 1967)
- Ischnocnema randorum (Heyer, 1985)
- Ischnocnema sambaqui (Castanho and Haddad, 2000)
- Ischnocnema spanios (Heyer, 1985)
- Ischnocnema surda Canedo, Pimenta, Leite, and Caramaschi, 2010
- Ischnocnema venancioi (Lutz, 1958)
- Ischnocnema verrucosa Reinhardt and Lütken, 1862
- Ischnocnema vizottoi Martins and Haddad, 2010
