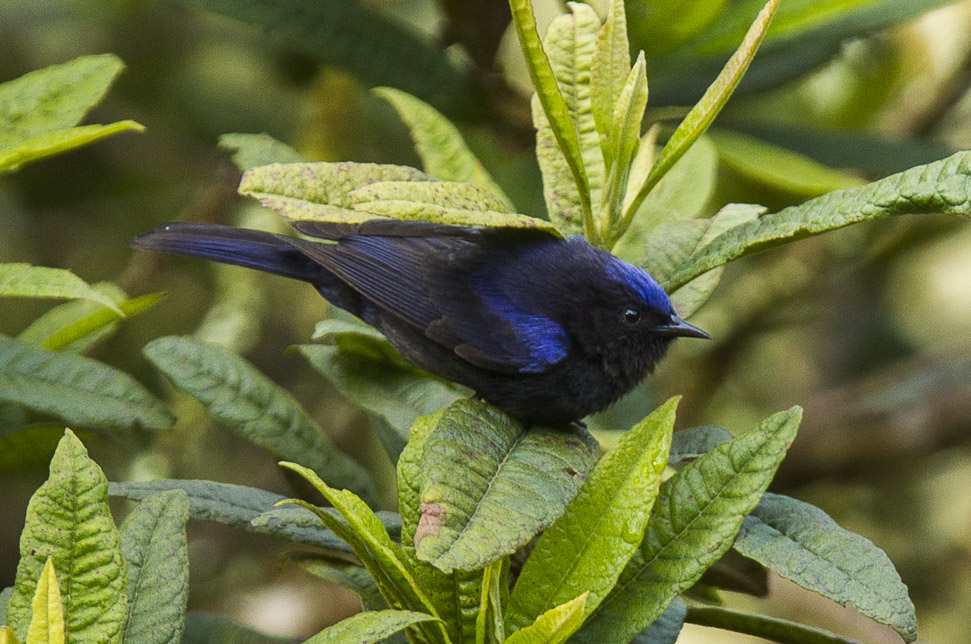
- A male in Ecuador Song of Capped Conebill

Conservation status
- Least Concern (IUCN 3.1)

Scientific classification
- Kingdom: Animalia
- Phylum: Chordata
- Class: Aves
- Order: Passeriformes
- Family: Thraupidae
- Genus: Conirostrum
- Species: C. albifrons

Binomial name
- Conirostrum albifrons Lafresnaye, 1842

= Capped conebill =

Species of bird

The capped conebill (Conirostrum albifrons) is a species of bird in the family Thraupidae.

It is found in Bolivia, Colombia, Ecuador, Peru, and Venezuela. Its natural habitats are subtropical or tropical moist montane forests and heavily degraded former forest.

== Taxonomy ==
The capped conebill was described by Frédéric de Lafresnaye as Ptyonura albifrons, which he regarded as a synonym of Muscisaxicola. From the description provided, the type specimen appears to be a female. It is now placed in the Conirostrum with the other conebills. The genus name Conirostrum comes from the Latin words "conus" which means cone and "rostrum" which means beak or bill. Albifrons means "white-fronted," referring to the white crown males in the north of the range have. There are currently six recognised subspecies:

- C. a. albifrons - (Lafresnaye, 1842): Central and east Andes of Colombia, Táchira, Venezuela
- C. a. centralandium - (Schauensee, 1946): Antioquia to Cauca in Colombia
- C. a. cyanonotum - (Todd, 1932): Coastal mountains of Venezuela
- C. a. atrocyaneum - (Lafresnaye, 1848): Andes of southwest Colombia, Ecuador, and northern Peru
- C. a. sordidum - (Berlepsch, 1901): Junín in Peru to La Paz in Bolivia
- C. a. lugens - (Berlepsch, 1901): Yungas of eastern Bolivia

== Description ==
The capped conebill is 13-14 cm long and weighs 11.7-21.5 g. Males in the "albifrons" group sport a white crown, with a slaty-black face, breast, and neck; a liberty blue shoulder and tail; and a navy blue back. Males in the "atrocyaneum" group have a deep blue cap, back, wing, and tail; a glaucous shoulder; and a slaty breast, neck, and face. Females have a light blue crown, a blue-grey head, a dark yellow body, and an olive back and wings. Both sexes have a slightly-curved black bill and grey legs.

== Distribution & habitat ==
The capped conebill ranges from a separate population in Venezuela around the state of Miranda, through the Andes from Colombia to Peru, and then into the Yungas of Peru and Bolivia. It inhabits tropical montane cloud forest from 2000-2800 m.

== Status ==
The capped conebill is currently assessed as Least Concern by the IUCN, though its population is suspected to be decreasing.
