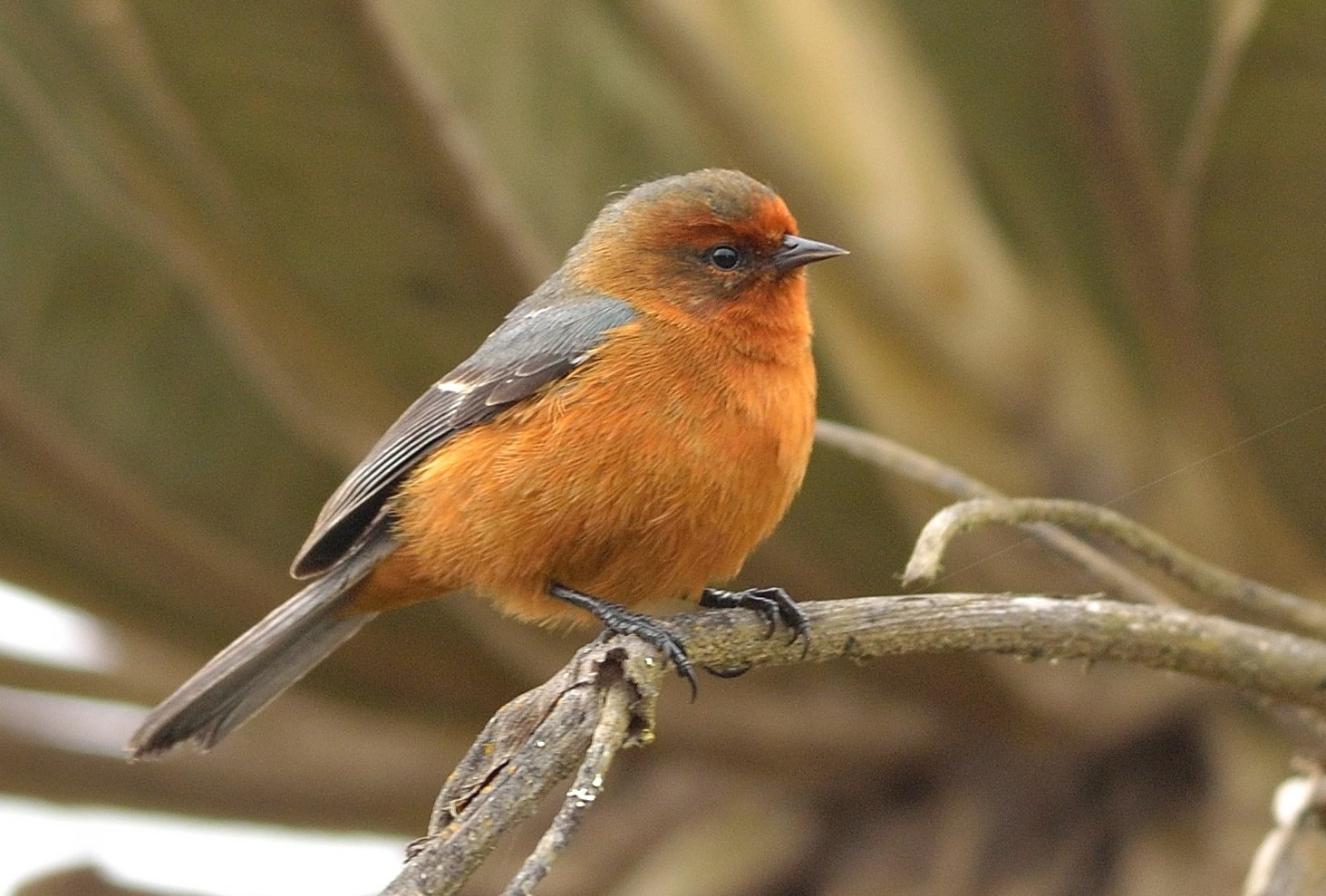

Conservation status
- Least Concern (IUCN 3.1)

Scientific classification
- Kingdom: Animalia
- Phylum: Chordata
- Class: Aves
- Order: Passeriformes
- Family: Thraupidae
- Genus: Conirostrum
- Species: C. rufum

Binomial name
- Conirostrum rufum Lafresnaye, 1843

= Rufous-browed conebill =

Species of bird

The rufous-browed conebill (Conirostrum rufum) is a species of bird in the family Thraupidae. It is found in Colombia and far western Venezuela. Its natural habitats are subtropical or tropical moist montane forests and subtropical or tropical high-altitude shrubland.
