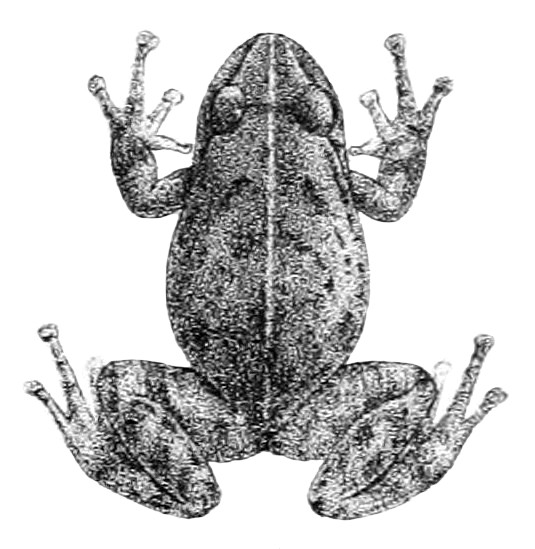

Conservation status
- Least Concern (IUCN 3.1)

Scientific classification
- Kingdom: Animalia
- Phylum: Chordata
- Class: Amphibia
- Order: Anura
- Family: Strabomantidae
- Genus: Pristimantis
- Species: P. unistrigatus

Binomial name
- Pristimantis unistrigatus (Günther, 1859)

Synonyms
- List: Hylodes unistrigatus Günther, 1859; Eleutherodactylus unistrigatus (Günther, 1859); Hylodes lehmanni Boettger, 1892; Prostherapis equatorialis Barbour, 1908; Syrrhophus coeruleus Andersson, 1945

= Pristimantis unistrigatus =

Species of amphibian

Pristimantis unistrigatus, common name: striped robber frog, is a species of frog in the family Strabomantidae. It is found in the Andean valleys from southern Colombia to central Ecuador.

== Description ==
Adult males measure 15–29 mm (0.6–1.1 in) and adult females 23–39 mm (0.9–1.5 in) in snout–vent length. The head is wider than the body in females but equal or narrower in males. The snout is rounded in lateral view and subacuminate to subovoid in dorsal view. The tympanum is visible but not distinct and partly obscured by the supratympanic fold. The finger and toe tips bear discs. Coloration is variable. The most common morph is pale brown above with an indefinite darker interorbital triangle and a series of brown spots forming dorsal chevrons. Another morph is similar to the first one but has a narrow, cream vertebral stripe running through the body. The third form is striped with several tan, medium-brown, and dark brown stripes on the back. Males have an external subgular vocal sac.

The male advertisement call is a hollow click.

== Distribution ==
Pristimantis unistrigatus is found in the Colombian Massif in southern Colombia (Putumayo and Nariño Departments), and in the inter-Andean valleys of Ecuador all way south to the Chimborazo Province.

== Habitat and conservation ==
Pristimantis unistrigatus is a common species found in various open habitats (grasslands and cultivated areas including pastures, ditches, shrubs, croplands) as well as forest edges and even urban areas at elevations of 2,200–3,400 m (7,200–11,200 ft) above sea level. During the day these frogs hide under objects on the ground, occasionally also in arboreal bromeliads. At night they are active on vegetation and on the ground.

The only threat to this species is heavy agrochemical pollution. Its range overlaps with several protected areas.
