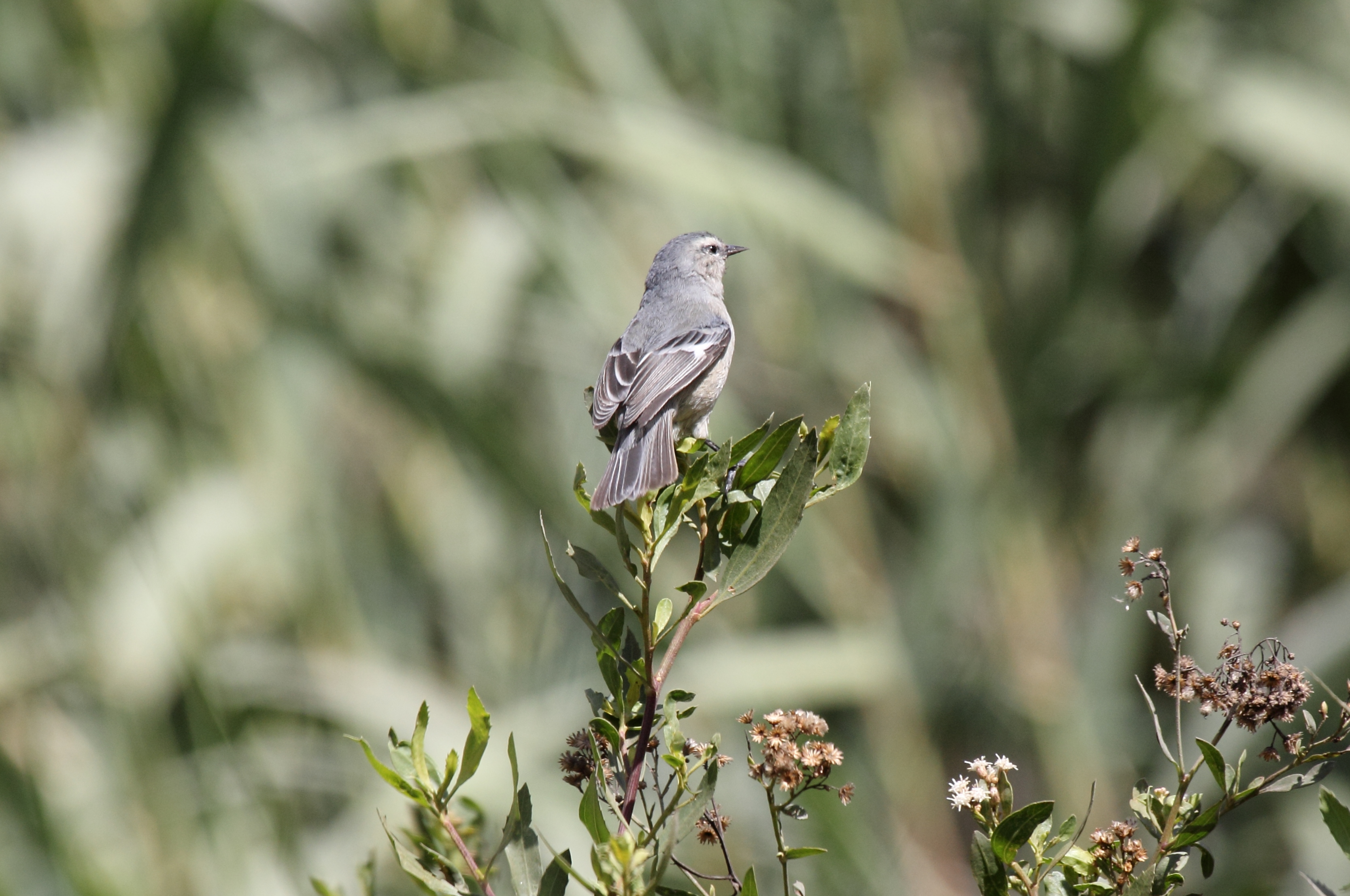

Conservation status
- Least Concern (IUCN 3.1)

Scientific classification
- Kingdom: Animalia
- Phylum: Chordata
- Class: Aves
- Order: Passeriformes
- Family: Thraupidae
- Genus: Conirostrum
- Species: C. cinereum

Binomial name
- Conirostrum cinereum d'Orbigny & Lafresnaye, 1838

= Cinereous conebill =

Species of bird

The cinereous conebill (Conirostrum cinereum) is a species of bird in the tanager family Thraupidae. Its range extends from south-western Colombia et northern Chile and Bolivia. Its natural habitats are subtropical or tropical moist shrubland, subtropical or tropical high-altitude shrubland, and heavily degraded former forest.

== Subspecies fraseri en Ecuador ==
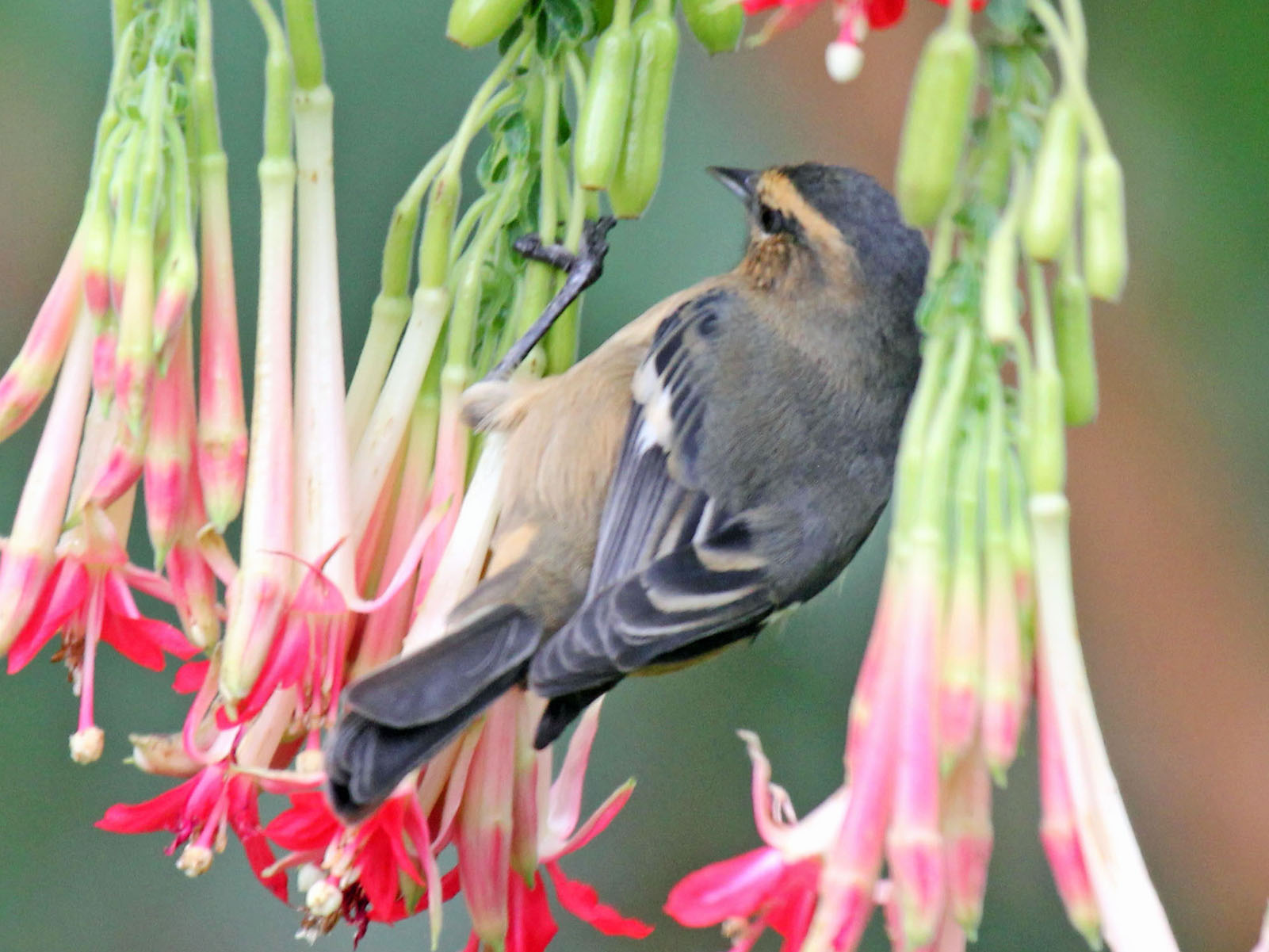

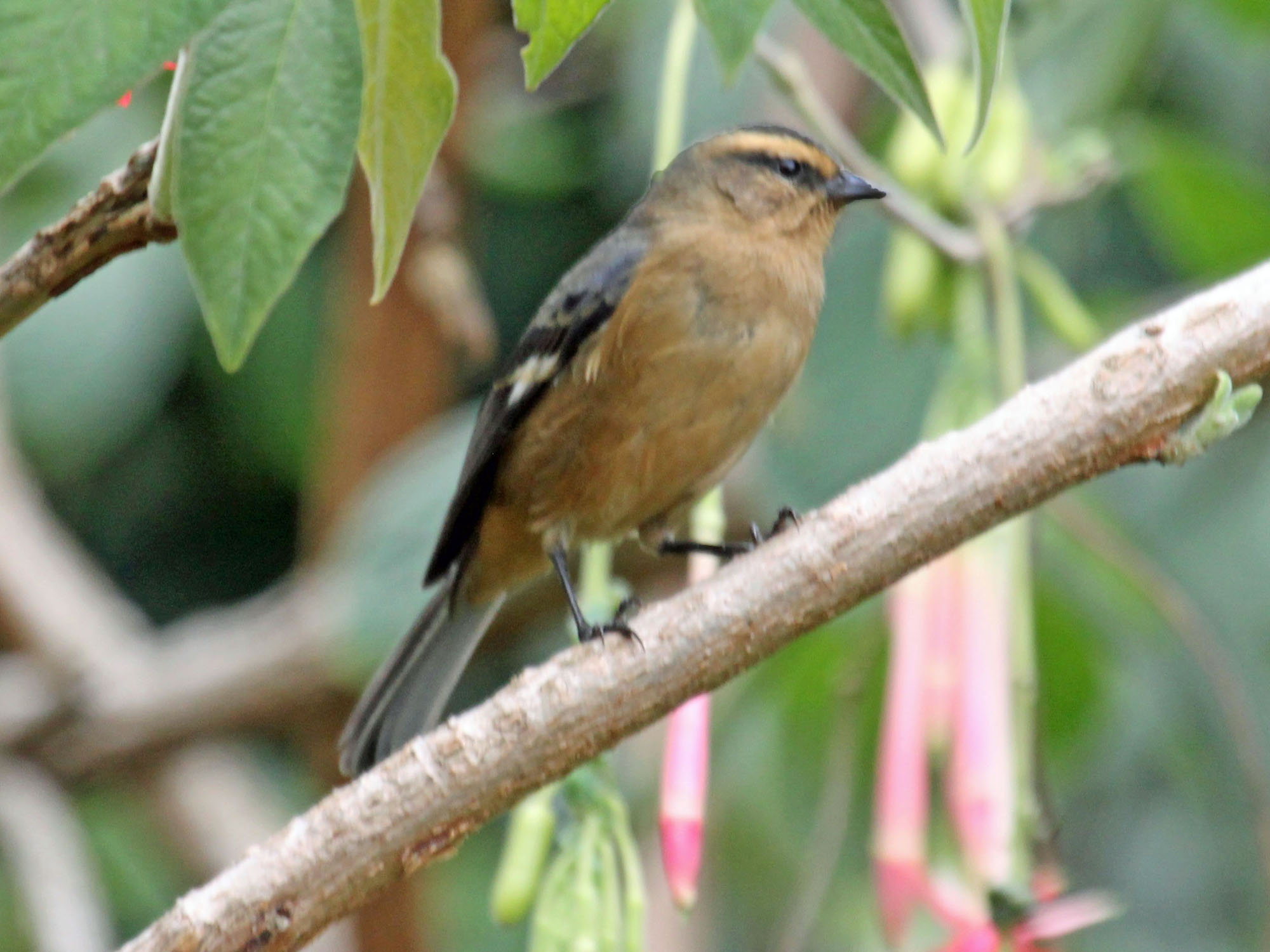

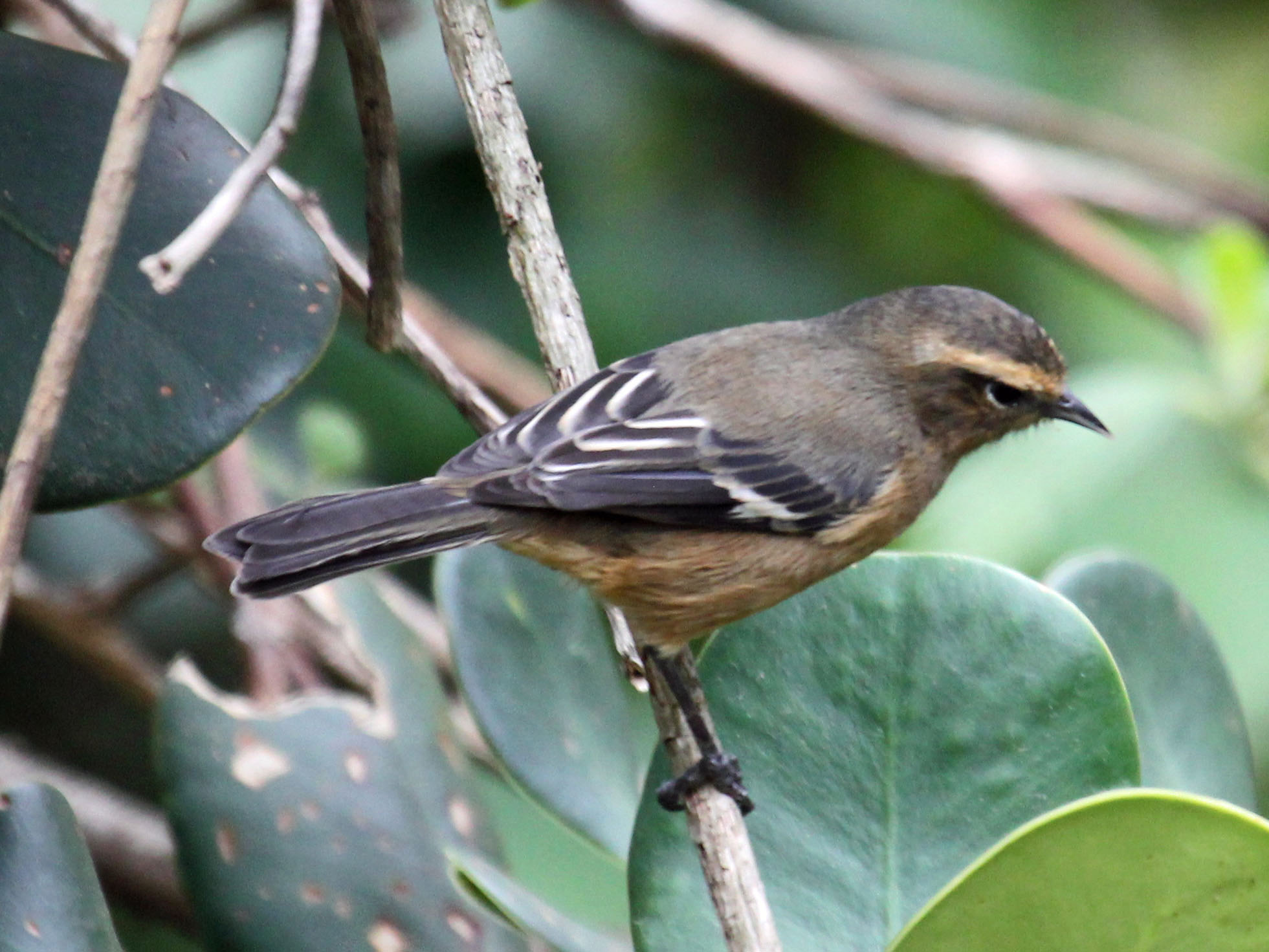
