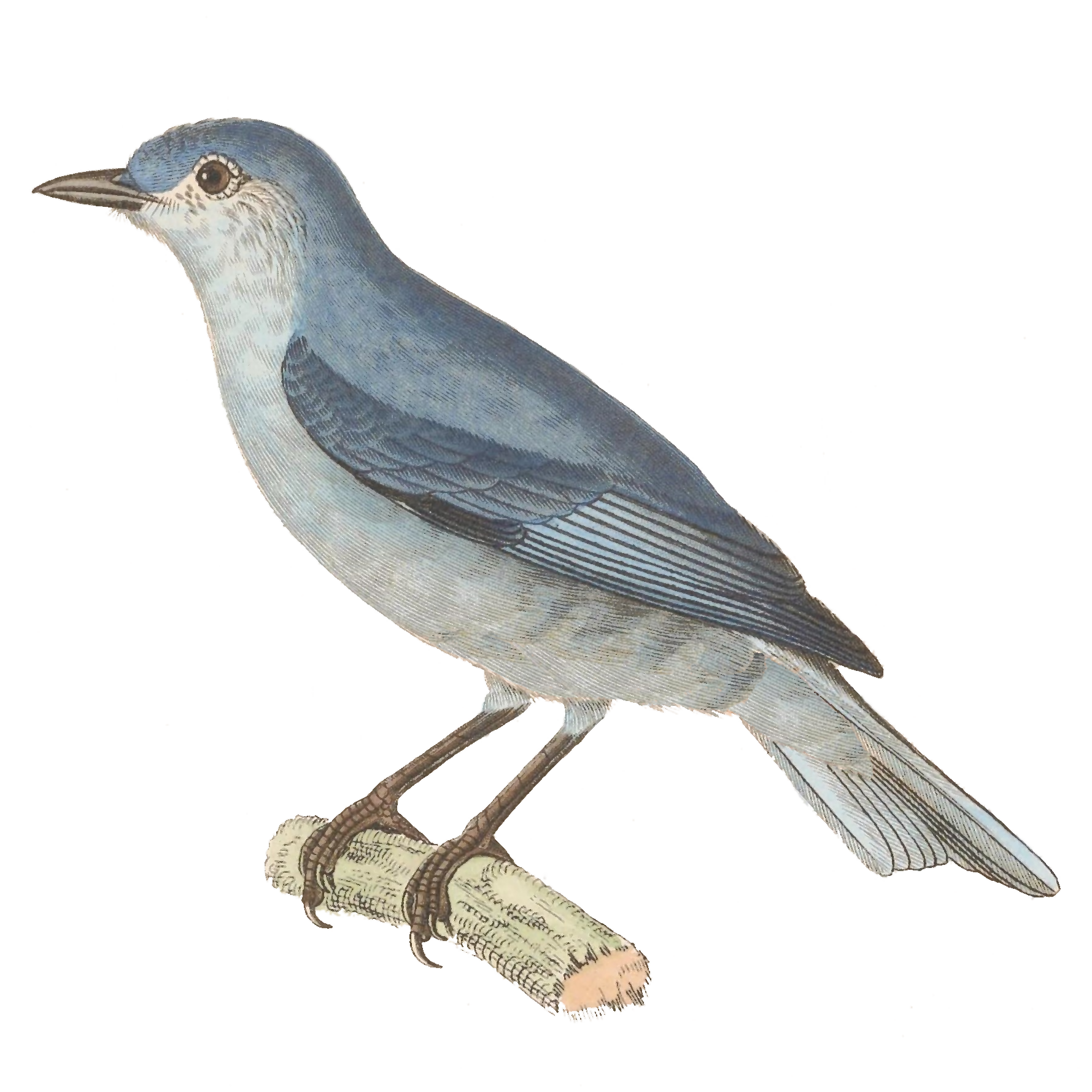

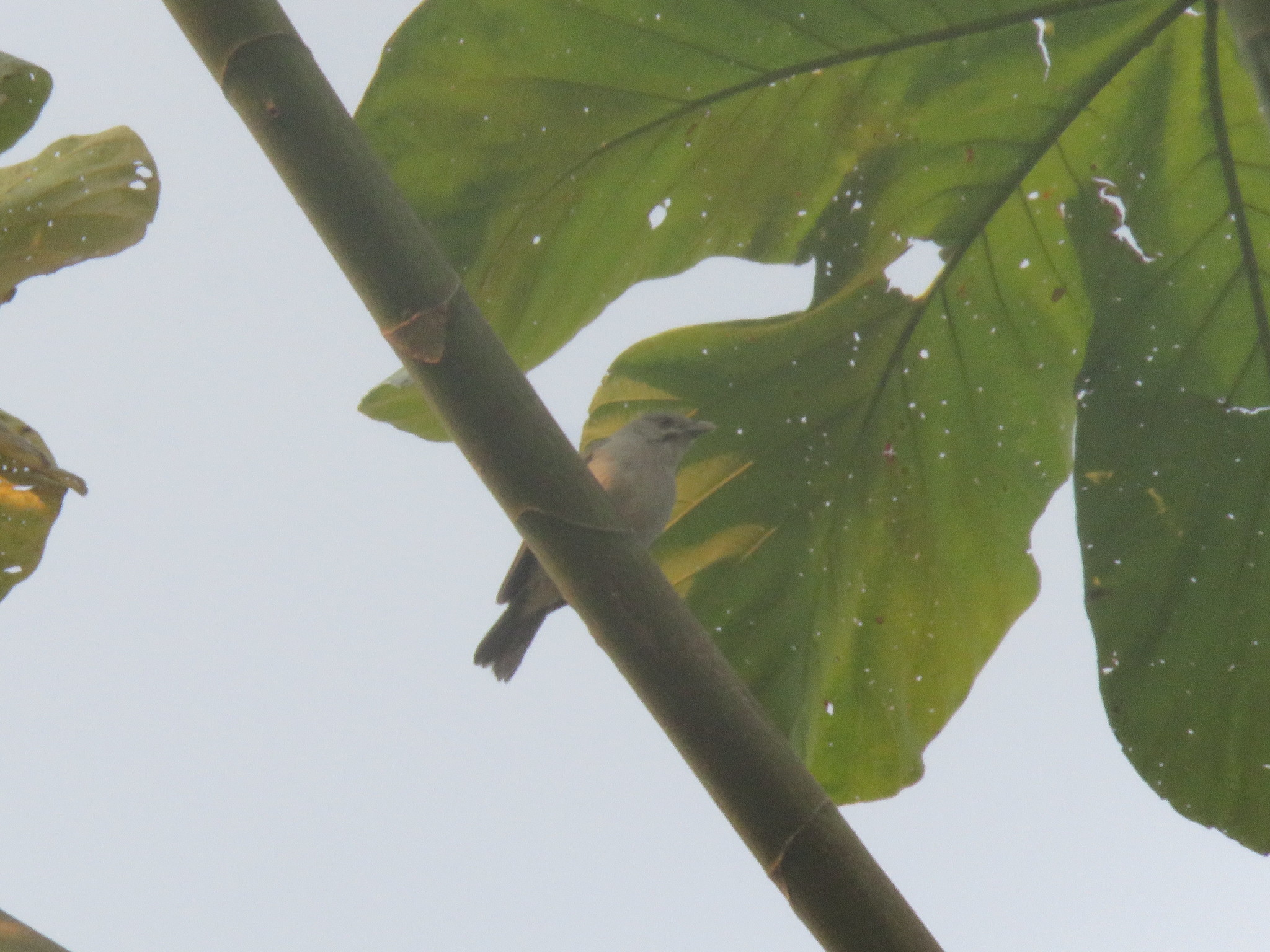

Conservation status
- Vulnerable (IUCN 3.1)

Scientific classification
- Kingdom: Animalia
- Phylum: Chordata
- Class: Aves
- Order: Passeriformes
- Family: Thraupidae
- Genus: Conirostrum
- Species: C. margaritae

Binomial name
- Conirostrum margaritae (Holt, EG, 1931)

= Pearly-breasted conebill =

Species of bird

The pearly-breasted conebill (Conirostrum margaritae) is a species of bird in the family Thraupidae.

== Habitat ==
It is native to riverine areas of the Amazon River, and is also found in northern Bolivia (confluent of Mamoré and Madre de Dios River). Its natural habitat is subtropical or tropical forests.
