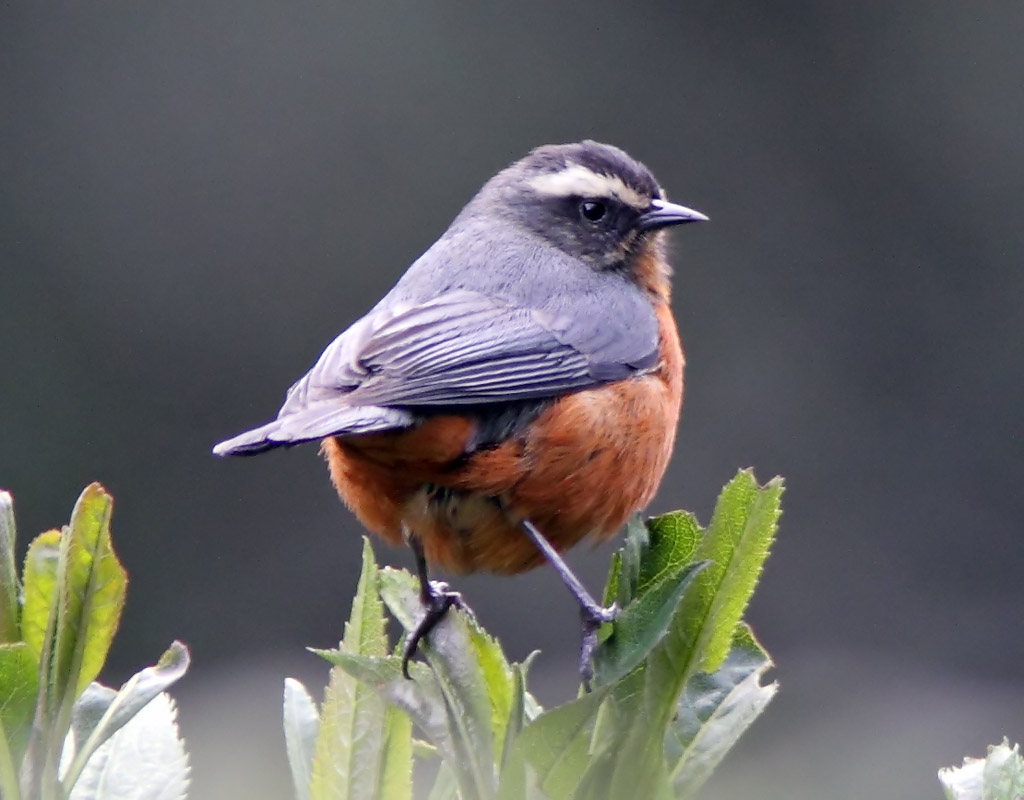

Conservation status
- Least Concern (IUCN 3.1)

Scientific classification
- Kingdom: Animalia
- Phylum: Chordata
- Class: Aves
- Order: Passeriformes
- Family: Thraupidae
- Genus: Conirostrum
- Species: C. ferrugineiventre

Binomial name
- Conirostrum ferrugineiventre Sclater, PL, 1855

= White-browed conebill =

Species of bird

The white-browed conebill (Conirostrum ferrugineiventre) is a species of bird in the family Thraupidae. It is found in Bolivia and Peru. Its natural habitat is subtropical or tropical moist montane forests.
