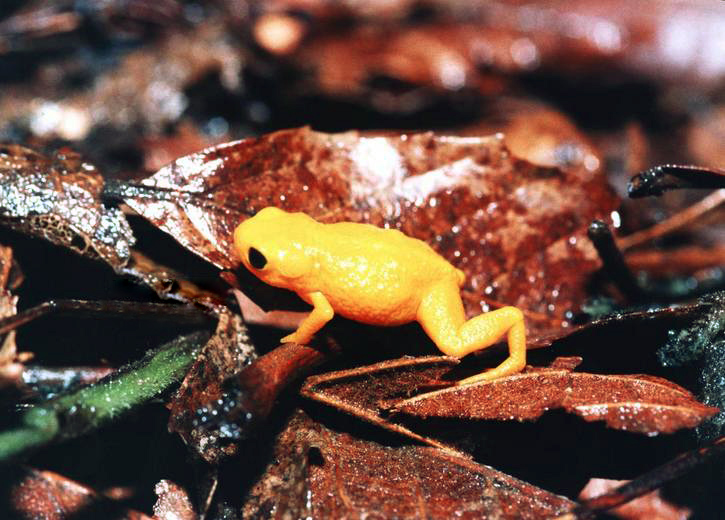

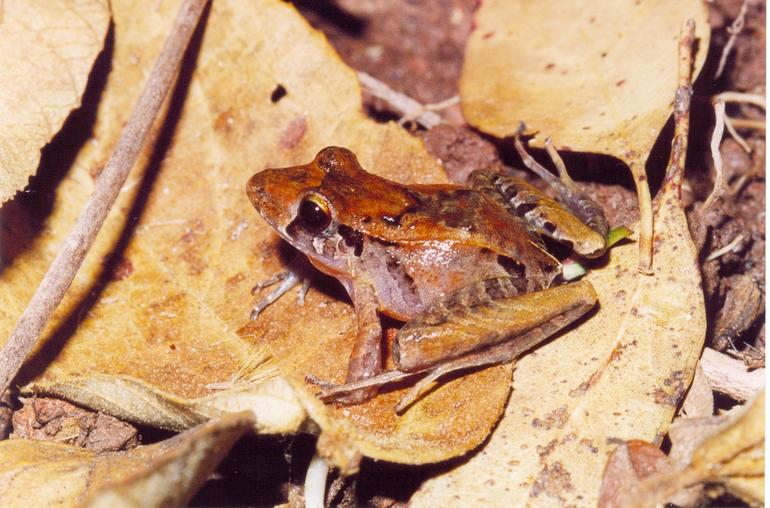
- Brachycephalus ephippium (above), Ischnocnema izecksohni (below)

Scientific classification
- Kingdom: Animalia
- Phylum: Chordata
- Class: Amphibia
- Order: Anura
- Clade: Brachycephaloidea
- Family: Brachycephalidae; Günther, 1858

Type genus
- Brachycephalus Fitzinger, 1826

Genera
- Brachycephalus Fitzinger, 1826; Ischnocnema Reinhardt and Lütken, 1862

Synonyms
- Brachycephalina Günther, 1858

= Brachycephalidae =

Family of amphibians

The Brachycephalidae (/ˌbrækɪsɪˈfælɪdi/) are a family of frogs confined to eastern and southern Brazil and northern Argentina. The family is composed of two externally quite different genera: the tiny, often (but not always) colourful and plump saddleback toads (Brachycephalus) from Brazil, and the larger, slimmer and more drab genus Ischnocnema from both Brazil and Argentina. The family is mainly defined by molecular characteristics, and are linked by few anatomical features. It was erected from two genera of the previously large family Eleutherodactylidae, which is now split into four families.

The Brachycephalidae all have direct development and hatch like miniature adults rather than as tadpoles like most frogs. The members of the genus Brachycephalus are all very diminutive animals, with many species under 1 cm (0.4 in) in snout–to–vent length.
