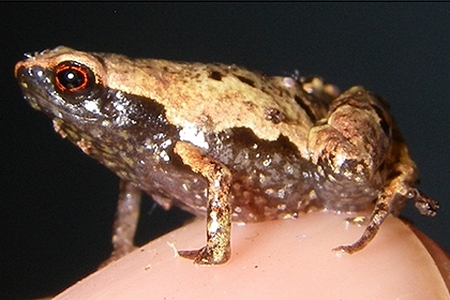
- Side view of Mini mum

Scientific classification
- Kingdom: Animalia
- Phylum: Chordata
- Class: Amphibia
- Order: Anura
- Family: Microhylidae
- Subfamily: Cophylinae
- Genus: Mini
- Species: M. mum

Binomial name
- Mini mum Scherz et al., 2019
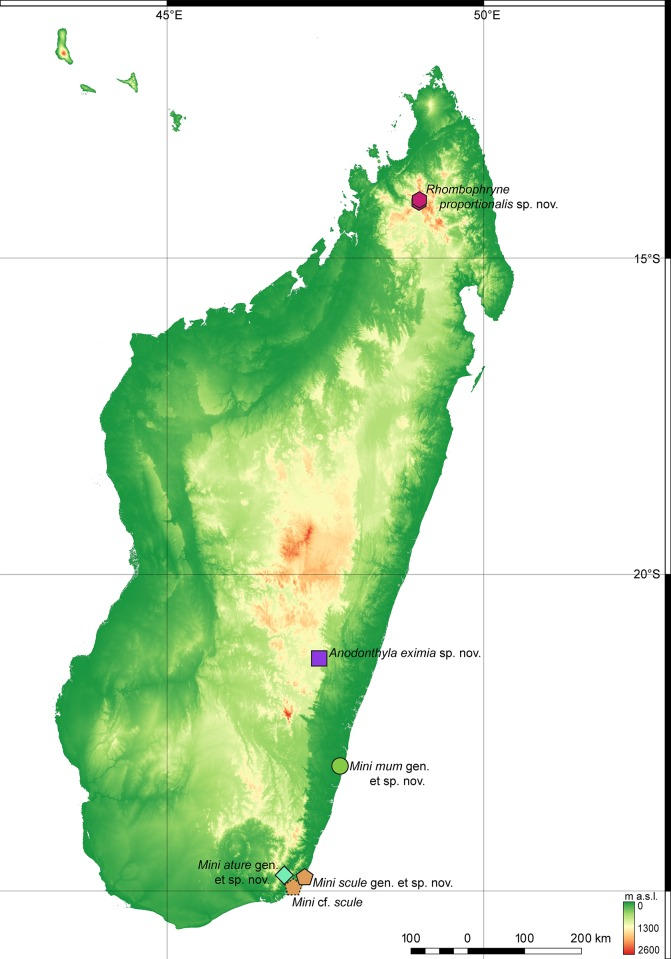
- Known range of Mini mum (green circle, bottom right)

Synonyms
- Cophyla mum — Dubois et al., 2021

= Mini mum =

Species of amphibian

Mini mum is a species of microhylid frog endemic to Madagascar that was described in 2019. It is the type species of its genus, Mini. The scientific name of the species refers to its size, being a pun on the word minimum: this wordplay led to the species receiving media attention when first described.

The species is very small, measuring only 8.2–11.3 mm (0.32–0.44 in) in snout–vent length. It has a burnt umber underside with beige flecking, dark rectangular marks near the groin, a silvery-brown back, and a red iris. It is known only from the Manombo Special Reserve, where it inhabits open lowland forest with short trees, lianas, and thick layers of dead leaves. Little is known of its ecology, but it may feed on oribatid mites, and a female specimen collected in late March contained eggs. Although it has not been assessed by the International Union for Conservation of Nature, the authors of the article in which it is described recommended that it be listed as critically endangered due to its extremely small and highly deforested range.

== Taxonomy and systematics ==
Mini mum was described in 2019 by the herpetologist Mark Scherz and colleagues on the basis of an adult specimen collected from the Manombo Special Reserve in Atsimo-Atsinanana, Madagascar in 2014. It is the type species for the genus Mini. The name Mini mum is a pun on the word minimum, referring to the extremely small size of the species. It is regarded as an invariable noun (a noun with the same masculine and feminine forms). Along with Mini ature and M. scule, the other two species in its genus, M. mum received publicity when it was first described due to its humorous scientific name.

The species belongs to the widespread family Microhylidae, which contains more than 650 species of mostly small frogs. It is most closely related to a clade formed by M. scule and M. ature. The study that described the species placed the genus Mini as sister to Plethodontohyla (which contains the world's largest microhylid frog, P. inguinalis), despite the former being morphologically more similar to Stumpffia. However, a 2021 phylogeny by Alain Dubois and colleagues suggests that for the genus Cophyla to be monophyletic, Plethodontohyla and Mini should be lumped with it. This would make the present species' name Cophyla mum.

The following cladograms show the differing phylogenies found by the 2019 and 2021 studies:

Based on the 2019 study

- Cophylinae
  - Madecassophryne
  - - - Anodonthyla
      - - - Mini
            - Mini mum
            - - Mini ature
              - Mini scule
          - Plethodontohyla
        - - Cophyla
          - Platypelis
    - - - Anilany
        - Rhombophryne
      - Stumpffia

Based on the 2021 study

- Cophylinae
  - Scaphiophrynini
    - Scaphiophryne
    - Paradoxophyla
  - - Rhombophrynina
      Rhombophryne
    - - Anodonthylina
        Anodonthyla
      - - Platypelina
          Platypelis
        - Cophilina
          - Cophyla (including Mini)
          - Mantipus

== Description ==
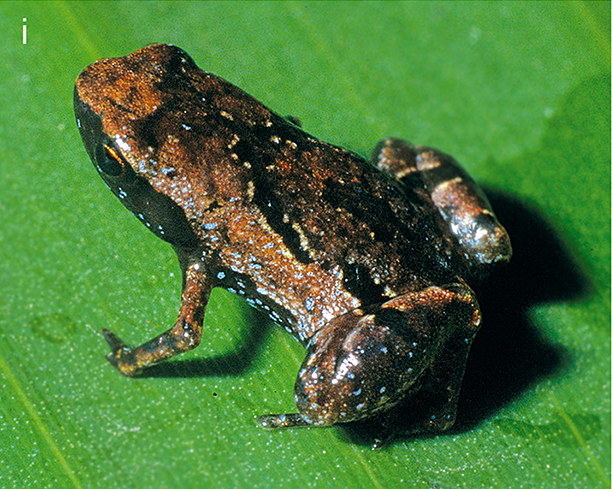
Dorsolateral view of Mini mum

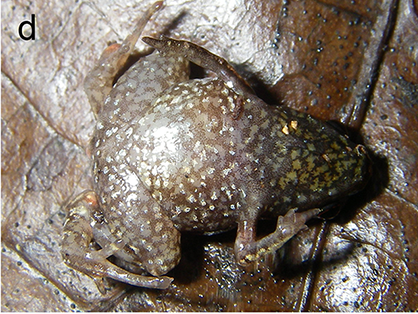
Bottom view of Mini mum

Mini mum is one of the smallest known species of frog, having a snout–vent length of 8.2–11.3 mm (0.32–0.44 in), with females slightly larger than males. The holotype, after being preserved in 70% ethanol for four years, was metallic silver along the middle of the back, bluish-silver on the head, and light silver along the sides of the back, with dark rectangular marks near the groin. The sides are black, with a prominent border between them and the back. The underside is burnt umber, darker towards the front, and flecked with beige. The flecks are larger towards the back, with the entire underside eventually fading to beige. The back of the leg is mottled cream and grey brown, while the underside of the leg is brown with beige markings. The arms are silvery above and black below. In life, the species is browner and less iridescent. The iris is red.

M. mum has a rectangular body, with the head being wider than it is long and narrower than the body. The snout is rounded from the top and tapered from the side, with non-protuberant nostrils that are slightly closer to the eyes than the snout. The lores are flat and vertical, and the tongue is long and thicker at the base than the tip. The first, second, and fourth fingers are greatly reduced, while the first toe is absent and the second and fifth toes are strongly reduced. The species lacks maxillary, premaxillary, and vomerine teeth.

Within its genus, it can be distinguished from both M. scule and M. ature by the absence of the maxillary and premaxillary teeth, as well as a more distinct border between the upperparts and underparts along the side. It is also similar to some species in Stumpffia but can be distinguished from them by its poorly ossified carpals, curved clavicles, and a neopalatine (supporting the premaxilla medially) and divided vomer.

The species makes regularly repeated single-note calls, with a duration of 67.8–81.8 milliseconds and a dominant frequency of 7949–8229 Hz. Its calls are very different from those of M. scule but similar to those of many Stumpffia species. They most resemble those of Stumpffia miery, S. tridactyla, S. contumelia, and S. obscoena. However, its calls are shorter and lower-pitched than those of S. obscoena, shorter and higher-pitched than those of S. tridactyla, and longer and higher-pitched than those of S. contumelia. The gap between two consecutive calls is slightly longer than that of S. miery.

== Distribution and habitat ==
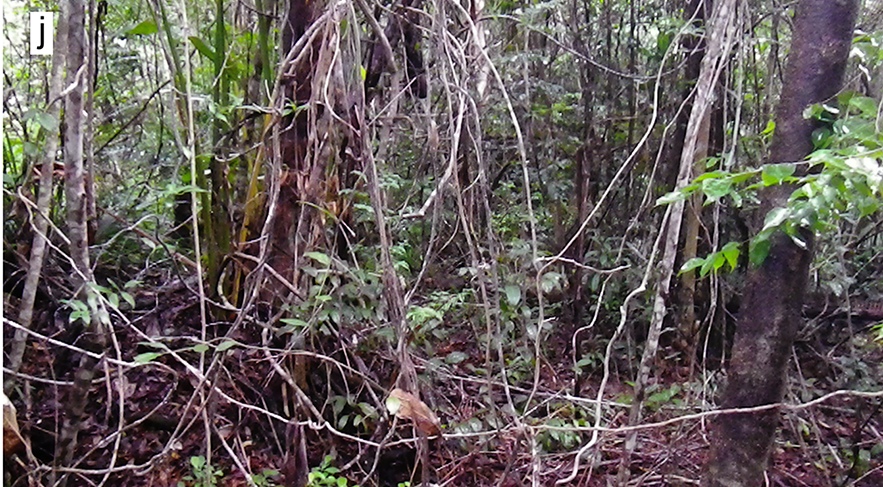
Mini mum habitat

Mini mum has an extremely limited range, being known only from areas in the Manombo Special Reserve. It is thought to inhabit open lowland forest around the reserve with short trees, lianas, and thick layers of dead leaves, at elevations of 0–100 m (0–328 ft).

== Ecology and conservation ==
Males of the species vocalize during the day while hiding between roots and in leaf litter, some meters away from other vocalizing males. A female specimen collected in late March contained four eggs, while the male holotype had several arthropods (thought to be oribatid mites) in its stomach.

Although M. mum has not been assessed by the International Union for Conservation of Nature, the authors of the article in which it is described recommended that it be listed as critically endangered due to its extremely small and highly deforested range.
