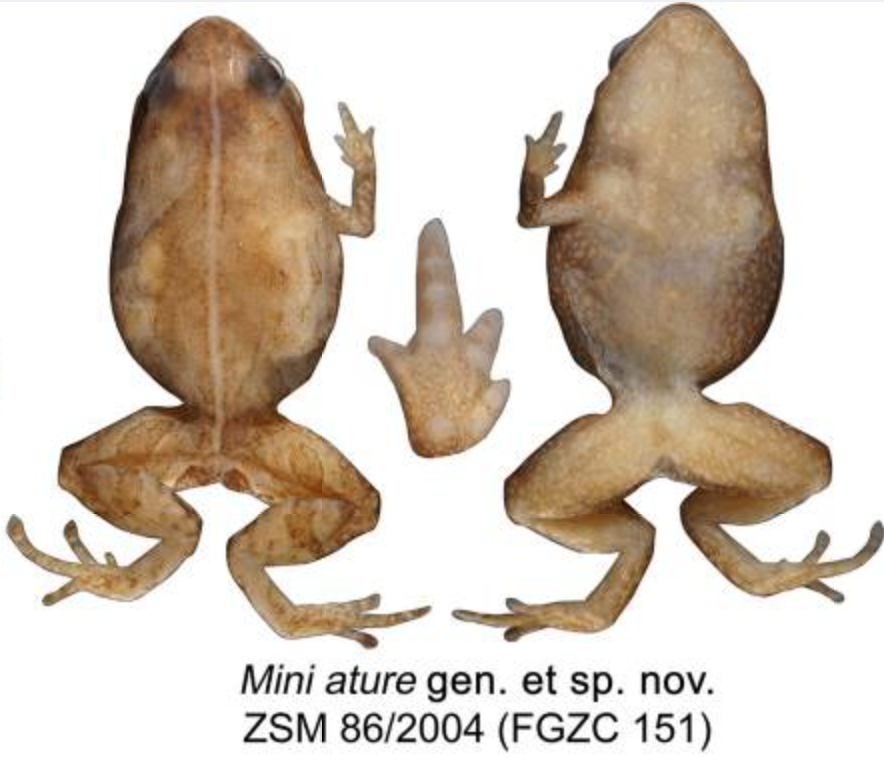
- Specimen of Mini ature

Scientific classification
- Kingdom: Animalia
- Phylum: Chordata
- Class: Amphibia
- Order: Anura
- Family: Microhylidae
- Subfamily: Cophylinae
- Genus: Mini
- Species: M. ature

Binomial name
- Mini ature Scherz et al., 2019
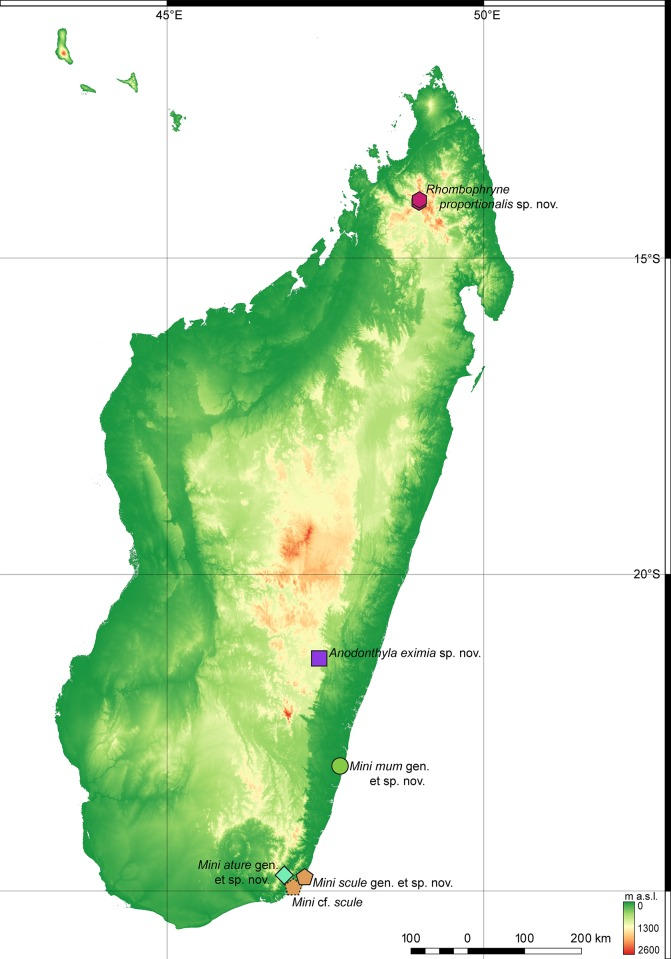
- known distribution of Mini ature (green rhombus, bottom right)

Synonyms
- Cophyla ature – Dubois et al., 2021

= Mini ature =

Species of frog endemic to Madagascar

Mini ature is a species of very small microhylid frog endemic to Madagascar described in 2019. The scientific name of the species refers to its size, being a pun on the word miniature. Although it measures only 14.9 mm (0.59 in) in snout–vent length, it is the largest species in its genus. The holotype of the species has a light brown back, beige sides, a dark brown underside with beige speckling that turns beige near the bottom, and a dark brown side and back of the head. It is known only from Andohahela National Park in Anosy, Madagascar. Like other species in its genus, it received media attention when first described due to the wordplay in its scientific name.

== Taxonomy and systematics ==
Mini ature was described in 2019 by the herpetologist Mark Scherz and colleagues on the basis of an adult specimen collected in Andohahela National Park in Anosy in Madagascar in 2004. The name Mini ature is a pun on the word miniature, referring to the extremely small size of the species. It is regarded as an invariable noun (a noun that does not change its endings according to the gender of the genus). Along with Mini mum and Mini scule, the other two species in its genus, the species received publicity when it was first described due to its humorous scientific name.

It is part of the family Microhylidae, a widespread family of over 650 species of mostly small frogs. It is most closely related to Mini scule, with these two species forming a clade sister to Mini mum. The study that described the species placed the genus Mini as sister to Plethodontohyla, despite the former being morphologically more similar to Stumpffia. However, a 2021 phylogeny by Alain Dubois and colleagues instead suggests that to be monophyletic, both Plethodontohyla and Mini should be lumped with Cophyla. This would make the present species' name Cophyla ature.

The following cladograms show the differing phylogenies found by the 2019 and 2021 studies:

Based on the 2019 study

- Cophylinae
  - Madecassophryne
  - - - Anodonthyla
      - - - Mini
            - Mini mum
            - - Mini ature
              - Mini scule
          - Plethodontohyla
        - - Cophyla
          - Platypelis
    - - - Anilany
        - Rhombophryne
      - Stumpffia

Based on the 2021 study

- Cophylinae
  - Scaphiophrynini
    - Scaphiophryne
    - Paradoxophyla
  - - Rhombophrynina
      Rhombophryne
    - - Anodonthylina
        Anodonthyla
      - - Platypelina
          Platypelis
        - Cophilina
          - Cophyla (including Mini)
          - Mantipus

== Description ==
Although Mini ature is an extremely small frog and has a snout–vent length of just 14.9 mm (0.59 in), it is the largest species in its genus. After 14 years of preservation in 70% ethanol, the holotype of the species had a light brown back, turning nearly beige at the sides. The side of the head is dark brown, while a trapezoidal area near the vent is brown. A crooked, distinct border is present at the sides, from the nostril through the eyes, ears, and body, up to the groin. Below the border, the body is dark brown with beige speckling, lightening to beige further down. There is a thin beige stripe over the backbone, while the area at the back of the head and the skin above the eyes is dark.

M. ature is rectangular in shape, with a head that is wider than it is long and narrower than the body. The snout is slightly pointed from the top and pointed from the side and the non-protuberant nostrils are pointed towards the sides and equidistant between the tip of the snout and the eyes. The lores are flat and vertical. The second and fourth fingers are reduced, while the first finger is greatly reduced. The first toe is absent and the second and fifth toes are highly reduced. The maxillary and premaxillary teeth are present, but the vomerine teeth are absent.

Within its genus, the species can be told apart by its larger size and shorter hindlimbs. It can be differentiated from M. mum by the presence of its maxillary and premaxillary teeth, and from M. scule by its proportionally smaller nasals and braincase. It can be told from most Stumpffia by its maxillary and premaxillary teeth, and from all of them by its curved clavicles (long bones between the shoulder blade and breastbone) and the loss or fusion of the second carpal. The species' calls are not known.

== Distribution ==
The only known specimen of Mini ature was collected from the Andohahela National Park in Madagascar, but its total distribution is unknown. As the species is larger than M. mum and M. scule, its ecology may differ from these correspondingly.

== Conservation ==
Mini ature's conservation status has not been assessed by the International Union for Conservation of Nature, but the authors of the study in which it was described recommended classifying it as data deficient due to the fact that its range and population are unknown and cannot be estimated.
