= Stumpffia maledicta =

Conservation status
- Critically Endangered (IUCN 3.1)

Scientific classification
- Kingdom: Animalia
- Phylum: Chordata
- Class: Amphibia
- Order: Anura
- Family: Microhylidae
- Subfamily: Cophylinae
- Genus: Stumpffia
- Species: S. maledicta

Binomial name
- Stumpffia maledicta Rakotoarison, Scherz, Glaw, Köhler, Andreone, Franzen, Glos, Hawlitschek, Jono, Mori, Ndriantsoa, Raminosoa, Riemann, Rödel, Rosa, Vieites, Crottini, and Vences, 2017

Species of frog

Stumpffia maledicta is a species of frog in the family Microhylidae. It is endemic to Madagascar, known only from its type location of Montagne d'Ambre National Park.

== Threats ==
The IUCN classifies this species as Critically Endangered, due to its small range and the deforestation of rainforest habitats where it could occur elsewhere from encroaching agriculture, urbanization, and mineral mining. Climate change will likely further damage its habitat, with changing humidity, precipitation levels, and temperatures.
