= Lygodactylus hapei =

Scientific classification
- Kingdom: Animalia
- Phylum: Chordata
- Class: Reptilia
- Order: Squamata
- Suborder: Gekkota
- Family: Gekkonidae
- Genus: Lygodactylus
- Species: L. hapei

Binomial name
- Lygodactylus hapei Vences, Multzch, Gippner, Miralles, Crottini, Gehring, Rakotoarison, Ratsoavina, Glad, & Scherz, 2022

Species of lizard

Lygodactylus hapei is a species of gecko endemic to Madagascar.
