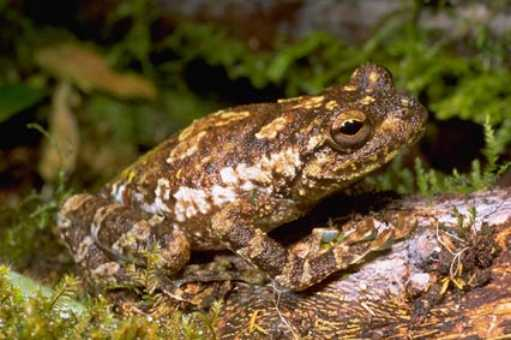

Conservation status
- Least Concern (IUCN 3.1)

Scientific classification
- Kingdom: Animalia
- Phylum: Chordata
- Class: Amphibia
- Order: Anura
- Family: Microhylidae
- Subfamily: Cophylinae
- Genus: Platypelis
- Species: P. grandis

Binomial name
- Platypelis grandis (Boulenger, 1889)

= Platypelis grandis =

Species of frog

Platypelis grandis is a species of frog in the family Microhylidae. It is endemic to Madagascar. Its natural habitats are subtropical or tropical moist lowland forests and subtropical or tropical moist montane forests. It is threatened by habitat loss. Juveniles are recognizable by the green protuberances on their body, which help them camouflage and hunt. When mature, coloring is brown and green. Insects make up the bulk of their diet.
