= Platypelis pollicaris =

Conservation status
- Least Concern (IUCN 3.1)

Scientific classification
- Kingdom: Animalia
- Phylum: Chordata
- Class: Amphibia
- Order: Anura
- Family: Microhylidae
- Subfamily: Cophylinae
- Genus: Platypelis
- Species: P. pollicaris

Binomial name
- Platypelis pollicaris (Boulenger, 1889)

Species of frog

Platypelis pollicaris, or common giant tree frog, is a species of frog in the family Microhylidae. It is endemic to northern and eastern Madagascar. Its natural habitats are subtropical or tropical moist lowland forests, subtropical or tropical moist montane forests, plantations, and heavily degraded former forest. It is threatened by habitat loss.

== Sources ==
- IUCN SSC Amphibian Specialist Group (2016). "Cophyla pollicaris". IUCN Red List of Threatened Species. 2016 e.T57961A67477873. doi:10.2305/IUCN.UK.2016-1.RLTS.T57961A67477873.en.
