= Pseudospegopterus =

Scientific classification
- Kingdom: Animalia
- Phylum: Arthropoda
- Clade: Pancrustacea
- Class: Insecta
- Order: Coleoptera
- Suborder: Polyphaga
- Infraorder: Scarabaeiformia
- Family: Scarabaeidae
- Subfamily: Cetoniinae
- Tribe: Trichiini
- Genus: Pseudospegopterus; Ricchiardi 2015
- Species: P. melonthinoides

Binomial name
- Pseudospegopterus melonthinoides Ricchiardi, 2015

Monospecific genus of scarab beetle

Pseudospegopterus is a genus of scarab beetles in the subtribe Trichiina containing only a single species, Pseudospegopterus melonthinoides. The genus is endemic to northwestern South Africa and was erected to accommodate a single species distinguished by a unique combination of external and genitalic characters that separate it from superficially similar African Trichiini genera, particularly Stegopterus.

== Taxonomy ==
The genus Pseudospegopterus was described by Enrico Ricchiardi in 2015 in the European Journal of Taxonomy. It was established as a monospecific genus based on adult male morphology, following comparative examination of South African Trichiina. The type species, P. melonthinoides, was described simultaneously.

The generic name reflects the superficial resemblance of the type species to members of the genus Stegopterus, while indicating its distinct phylogenetic placement.

== Description ==
Members of Pseudospegopterus are medium-sized Trichiini scarabs with a robust, melolonthine-like habitus. Diagnostic characters include distinctive cephalic and pronotal morphology, elytral sculpturing, and male genital structures that clearly differentiate the genus from other Afrotropical Trichiina. Females remain unknown, as the genus is currently represented only by male specimens.

== Distribution and habitat ==
The genus is endemic to the Western Cape region of South Africa. Confirmed records are limited to two localities: Elands Bay and Pella Mission. Specimens have been collected in arid to semi-arid environments characteristic of the northwestern Cape, suggesting ecological specialization.

== Identification ==
A provisional dichotomous key to the African genera of Trichiina, including Pseudospegopterus, was provided in the original description to facilitate identification of male specimens.
