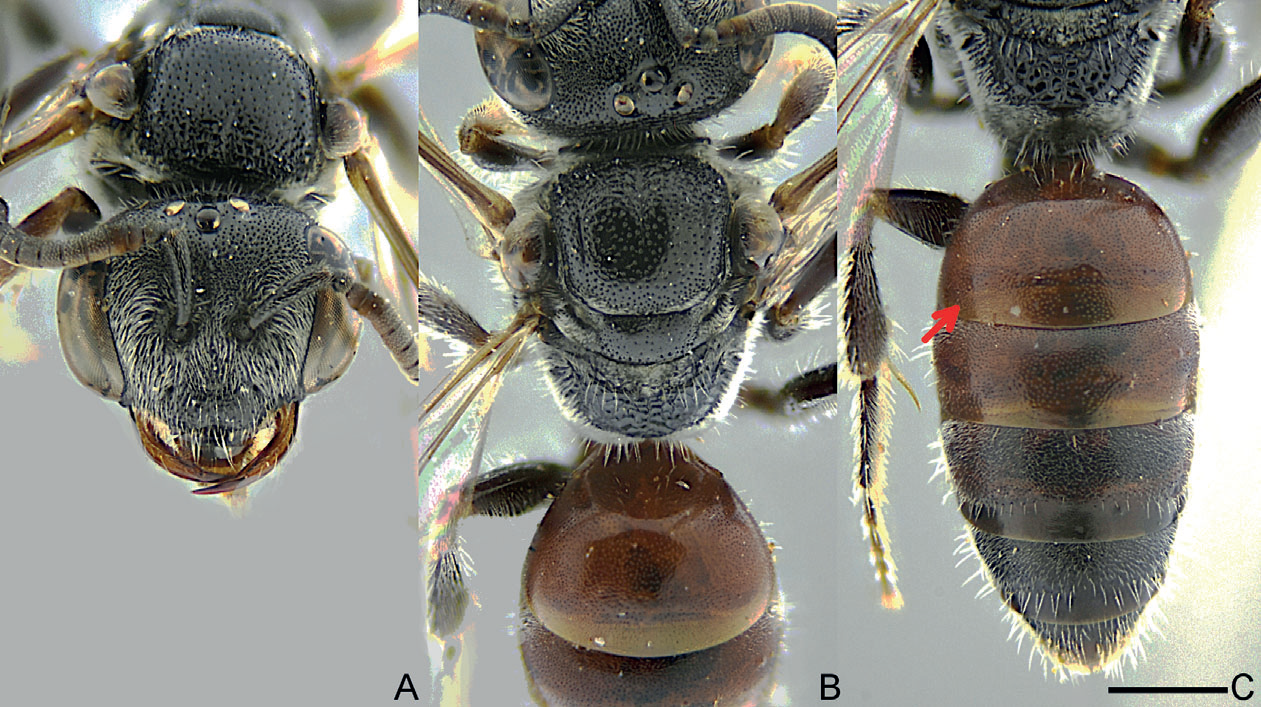

Scientific classification
- Kingdom: Animalia
- Phylum: Arthropoda
- Class: Insecta
- Order: Hymenoptera
- Family: Halictidae
- Genus: Austrosphecodes
- Species: A. krampus

Binomial name
- Austrosphecodes krampus Gonçalves & Pereira, 2022

= Austrosphecodes krampus =

Species of bees

Austrosphecodes krampus is a species of sweat bee in the subfamily Halictinae endemic to the southeastern Atlantic region of Brazil.

== Anatomy and morphology ==
Females of Austrosphecodes krampus average 7 mm (1/4 in) in length with a 1.4 mm (1/16 in) long by 1.8 mm (1/16 in) wide rectangular head. The majority of the head and mesosoma are black colored changing to a dark amber on the mandibles and a brownish tone on the undersides of the antennae. The fore legs transition from fully black to amber. The coxa and trochanter are fully black while the femur is black at its base transitioning to brown at the apical end. The tibia is an amber tone. The mid leg has only the coxa black, while the trochanter has lightened to a darkened amber tone and the femur dark brown basally grading to lighter brown apically, and the tibia is amber. The hind legs have coxa grading between black and dark amber which is continued across the trochanter, the femora again grade between dark and light browns, and the tibia again is amber. Varying densities of setae are found across the whole body, ranging from light to dark in coloration and from recumbent to erect.

The tergites of the body are notably punctate. The punctation on the scutellum is less dense than seen in Austrosphecodes lucifer, the punctations being separated from each other by the width of several punctures. Conversely Austrosphecodes inornatus is distinguishable by having a mesoscutal disc more punctate and having a more textured surface, and like Austrosphecodes orcus, the puncture depth is shallower than that of A. krampus.

The males of A. krampus have not been trapped or identified in collections.

== Ecology and behavior ==
Like all members of the genus Austrosphecodes, A. krampus is presumed to be cleptoparasitic, with possible host species being bees of the subfamilies Colletinae or Halictinae.

== Diet ==
The diet of Austrosphecodes krampus is unknown.

== Etymology ==
Austrosphecodes krampus was named in reference to Krampus, described by the authors as a half-man, half-goat anthropomorphic demon of the Christmas season.

== Taxonomy ==
Austrosphecodes krampus was studied based on two museum specimens in the Father Jesus Santiago Moure Insect Collection of the Federal University of Paraná. The holotype was designated as female specimen "DZUP\568515" while female specimen "DZUP 568516" was made a paratype. The wasps were named as a new species by Federal University entomologists Rodrigo Barbosa Gonçalves and Felipe Walter Pereira in a 2022 European Journal of Taxonomy article. A. krampus was one of nine new species identified in the article along with redescriptions of the three previously known Brazilian species. Along with the other species, A. krampus has been registered in ZooBank. Within the genus two species groups from Brazil were identified by Gonçalves and Pereira based on the punctation, pitting or bumps, of the terga. The smaller species group is united in having little to no punctation on the first metasomal tergite, while the larger species group, including A. krampus has a punctate to very punctate first metasomal tergite. Both A. krampus and A. lucifer share the feature of having notably deep punctate impressions.

== Distribution ==
Austrosphecodes krampus is native to the Atlantic coastal area of Santa Catarina state of southeastern Brazil. Insect trapping on November 17, 2002, was performed in a dunes area 9 km (5.6 mi) east of Araranguá city yielding both females.
