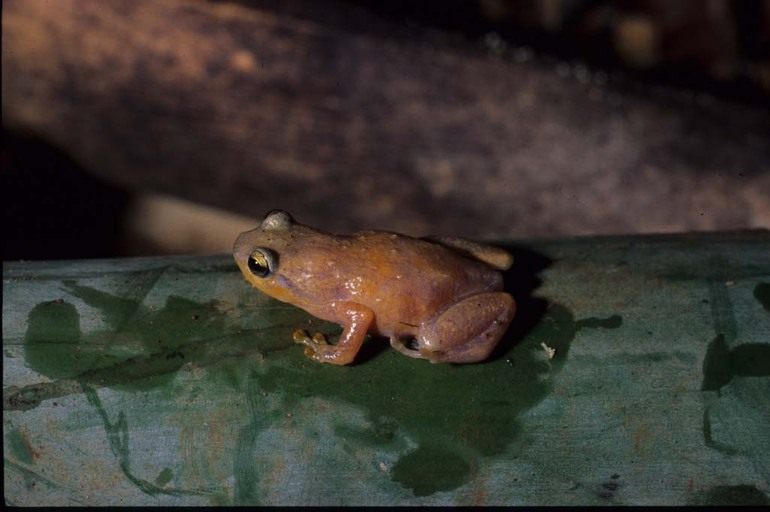

Conservation status
- Endangered (IUCN 3.1)

Scientific classification
- Kingdom: Animalia
- Phylum: Chordata
- Class: Amphibia
- Order: Anura
- Family: Microhylidae
- Subfamily: Cophylinae
- Genus: Cophyla
- Species: C. berara

Binomial name
- Cophyla berara Vences, Andreone & Glaw, 2005

= Cophyla berara =

Species of frog

Cophyla berara is a species of frog in the family Microhylidae. It is endemic to Madagascar. Its natural habitat is subtropical or tropical dry forests. It is threatened by habitat loss.
