= Zoologische Mededelingen =

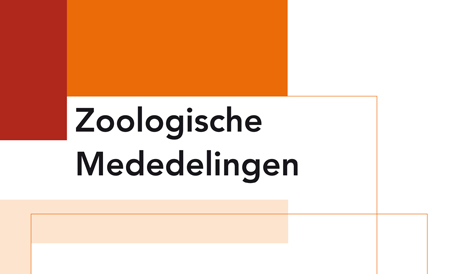
- Discipline: Zoology
- Language: English

Publication details
- Former name: Zoologische Mededeelingen (until 1948)
- History: 1915–2014
- Publisher: National Museum of Natural History (Naturalis) (Netherlands)
- Open access: Yes, since 2006
- License: Creative Commons Attribution 3.0

Standard abbreviations
- ISO 4: Zool. Meded.

Indexing
- ISSN: 0024-0672 (print); 1876-2174 (web)
- OCLC no.: 212304577

Links
- Journal homepage

Zoologische Mededelingen was a peer-reviewed open access scientific journal publishing papers and monographs on animal systematics. The publisher was the National Museum of Natural History Naturalis in the Netherlands. The first issue appeared in 1915, as the official journal of Naturalis' predecessor, the Rijks Museum van Natuurlijke Historie. Earlier, the museum published Muséum d'Histoire Naturelle des Pays-Bas (volumes I–XIV, 1862–1908) and Notes from the Leyden Museum (volumes I-XXXVI, 1879–1914), which mainly covered the fauna of the Netherlands and the former Dutch colonies.

Zoologische Mededelingen was indexed in The Zoological Record and BIOSIS. A complete backlist of published volumes is presented on the institutional repository of Naturalis. The last article was published in 2014 and the journal was merged into the European Journal of Taxonomy.
