= Cophyla phyllodactyla =

Conservation status
- Least Concern (IUCN 3.1)

Scientific classification
- Kingdom: Animalia
- Phylum: Chordata
- Class: Amphibia
- Order: Anura
- Family: Microhylidae
- Subfamily: Cophylinae
- Genus: Cophyla
- Species: C. phyllodactyla

Binomial name
- Cophyla phyllodactyla Boettger, 1880

Species of frog

Cophyla phyllodactyla is a species of frog in the family Microhylidae. It is endemic to Madagascar. Its natural habitats are subtropical or tropical moist lowland forests, subtropical or tropical moist montane forests, plantations, rural gardens, and heavily degraded former forest. It is threatened by habitat loss.
