= Stumpffia tetradactyla =

Conservation status
- Critically Endangered (IUCN 3.1)

Scientific classification
- Kingdom: Animalia
- Phylum: Chordata
- Class: Amphibia
- Order: Anura
- Family: Microhylidae
- Subfamily: Cophylinae
- Genus: Stumpffia
- Species: S. tetradactyla

Binomial name
- Stumpffia tetradactyla Vences & Glaw, 1991

Synonyms
- Rhombophryne tetradactyla Peloso et al., 2016

Species of frog

Stumpffia tetradactyla, commonly called the Macromandia stump-toed frog, is a species of frog in the family Microhylidae. It is endemic to Madagascar, specifically the island of Nosy Boraha. Its natural habitats are subtropical or tropical moist lowland forests and heavily degraded former forest. It is threatened by habitat loss resulting from agriculatural expansion, especially for the cultivation of cloves.
