= Natural history museum =

Institution that displays exhibits of natural historical significance

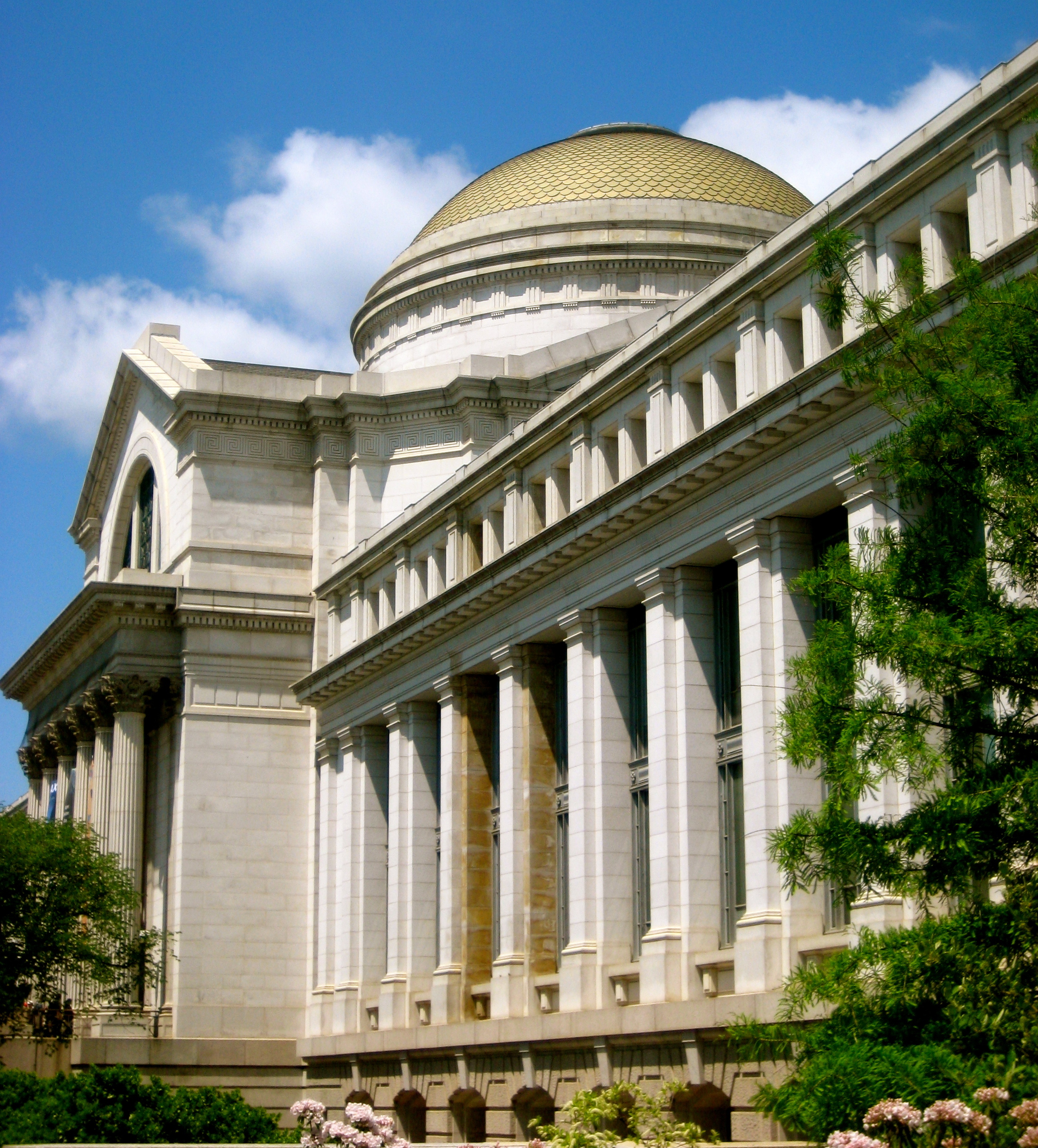
The Smithsonian Museum of Natural History, the largest natural history museum in the world

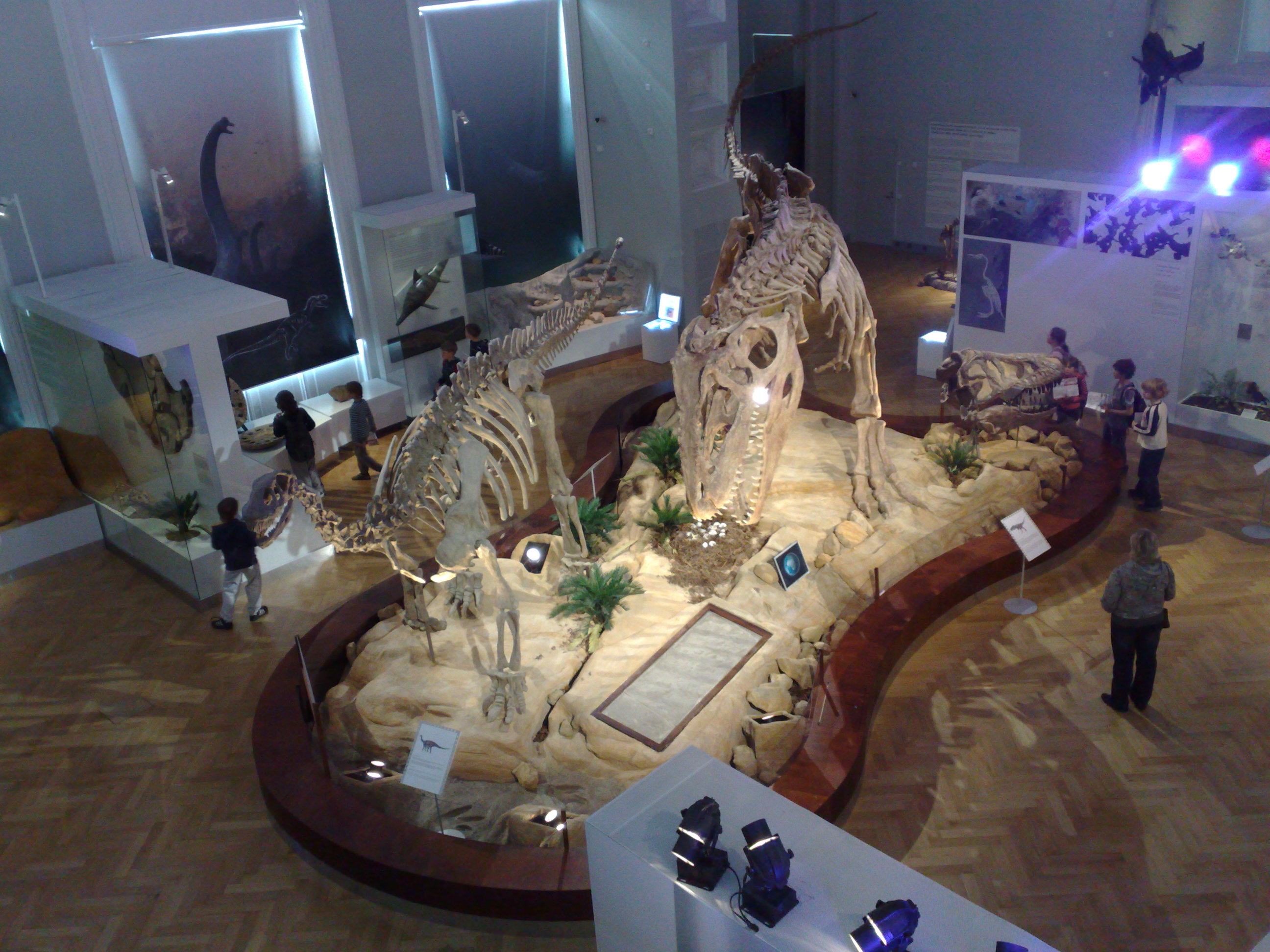
Skeletons of Shunosaurus (left) and Giganotosaurus (right) in the Finnish Museum of Natural History in Helsinki, Finland

A natural history museum or museum of natural history is a scientific institution with natural history collections that include current and historical records of animals, plants, fungi, ecosystems, geology, paleontology, climatology, and more.

== History ==
The primary role of a natural history museum is to provide the scientific community with current and historical specimens for their research, which is to improve our understanding of the natural world. Some museums have public exhibits to share the beauty and wonder of the natural world with the public; these are referred to as 'public museums'. Some museums feature non-natural history collections in addition to their primary collections, such as ones related to history, art, and science.

Renaissance cabinets of curiosities were private collections that typically included exotic specimens of national history, sometimes faked, along with other types of object. The first natural history museum was possibly that of Swiss scholar Conrad Gessner, established in Zürich in the mid-16th century. The National Museum of Natural History, established in Paris in 1635, was the first natural history museum to take the form that would be recognized as a natural history museum today. Early natural history museums offered limited accessibility, as they were generally private collections or holdings of scientific societies. The Ashmolean Museum, opened in England in 1683, was the first natural history museum to grant admission to the general public.

The natural history museum did not exist as a typical museum prior to the eighteenth century. Civic and university buildings did exist to house collections used for conducting research, however these served more as storage spaces than museums by today's understanding. All kept artifacts were displayed to the public as catalogs of research findings and served mostly as an archive of scientific knowledge. These spaces housed as many artifacts as fit and offered little description or interpretation for visitors. Kept organisms were typically arranged in their taxonomic systems and displayed with similar organisms. Museums did not think of the possibility of diverse audiences, instead adopting the view of an expert as the standard.

The mid-eighteenth century saw an increased interest in the scientific world by the middle class bourgeoisie who had greater time for leisure activities, physical mobility and educational opportunities than in previous eras. Other forms of science consumption, such as the zoo, had already grown in popularity. Now, the natural history museum is a new space for public interaction with the natural world. Museums began to change the way they exhibited their artifacts, hiring various forms of curators, to refine their displays. Additionally, they adopted new approaches to designing exhibits. These new ways of organizing would support the learning of the lay audience.

Organised by the League of Nations, the first International Museography Congress happened in Madrid in 1934. Again, the First World Congress on the Preservation and Conservation of Natural History Collections took place in Madrid, from 10 May 1992 to 15 May 1992.

=== Problems of space ===
While museum buildings where collections of artifacts were displayed started to overflow with materials, the prospect of a new building space would take years to build. As wealthy nations began to collect exotic artifacts and organisms from other countries, this problem continued to worsen. Museum funding came from a mixed bag of state or provincial support as well as university funding, causing differing systems of development and goals.

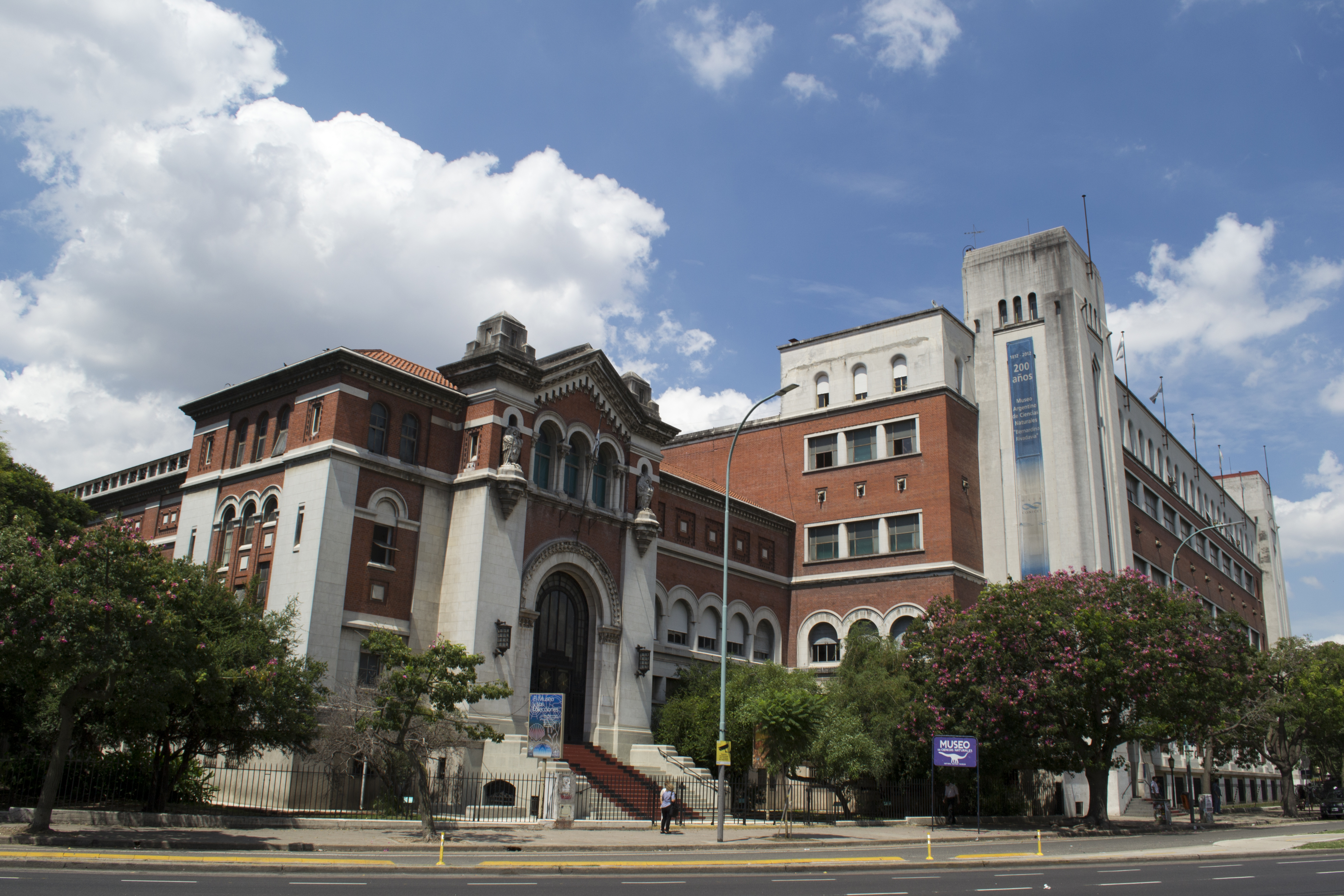
Bernardino Rivadavia Natural Sciences Argentine Museum in Buenos Aires, Argentina

=== Changing organization ===
Opportunities for a new public audience coupled with overflowing artifact collections led to a new design for natural history museums. A dual arrangement of museums was pioneered by J. Edward Gray, who worked with the British Museum in the 1860s. This layout separated the science-producing researcher from the science-consuming public audience. By doing so, museums were able to save space in the exhibit areas and display a smaller, more focused amount of material to the public. This also allowed for greater curation of exhibits that eased the lay viewer's learning and allowed them to develop a more holistic understanding of the natural world. Natural history museums became a story of our world, telling different organisms narratives. The use of dual arrangements was quickly adopted and advocated by many across the world. A notable proponent of its use was German zoologist Karl Mobias who divided the natural museum in Hamburg in 1866.

The goal of such museums was not only to display organisms, but to detail their interactions in the human world as well as within their unique ecosystems. Naturalists such as American Joseph Leidy pushed for greater emphasis on the biological perspective in exhibits to teach the public more about the functional relationships between organisms. This required the expertise of a zoologist and botanist. As this kind of work was not typical for educated scientists of the time, the new profession of curator developed.

=== Genomic information ===
Natural history collections are invaluable repositories of genomic information that can be used to examine the histories of biodiversity and environmental change. Collaborations between museums and researchers worldwide are enabling scientists to unravel ecological and evolutionary relationships such as the domestication of the horse, using genetic samples from museum collections. New methods and technologies are being developed to support museomics.

== See also ==
- List of natural history museums
- Diorama § Natural history
