= Stumpffia roseifemoralis =

Conservation status
- Endangered (IUCN 3.1)

Scientific classification
- Kingdom: Animalia
- Phylum: Chordata
- Class: Amphibia
- Order: Anura
- Family: Microhylidae
- Subfamily: Cophylinae
- Genus: Stumpffia
- Species: S. roseifemoralis

Binomial name
- Stumpffia roseifemoralis Guibé, 1973

Synonyms
- Rhombophryne roseifemoralis Peloso et al., 2016

Species of frog

Stumpffia roseifemoralis is a species of frog in the family Microhylidae. It is endemic to Madagascar. Its natural habitats are subtropical or tropical moist lowland forests, subtropical or tropical moist montane forests, and heavily degraded former forest. It is threatened by habitat loss.
