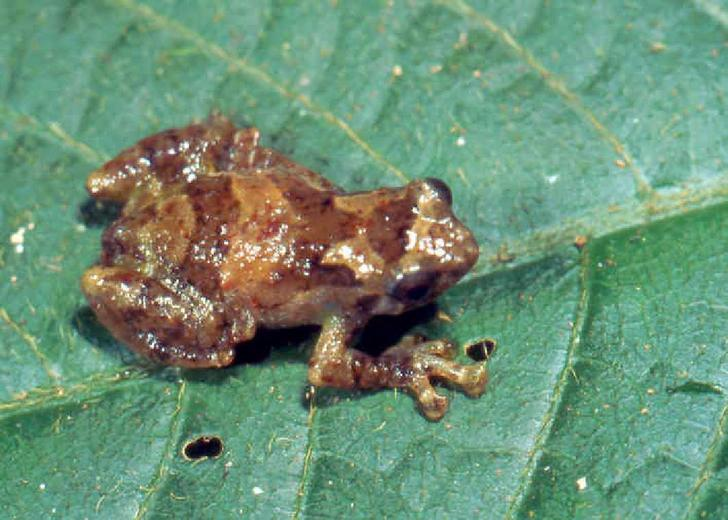

Conservation status
- Vulnerable (IUCN 3.1)

Scientific classification
- Kingdom: Animalia
- Phylum: Chordata
- Class: Amphibia
- Order: Anura
- Family: Microhylidae
- Subfamily: Cophylinae
- Genus: Cophyla
- Species: C. occultans

Binomial name
- Cophyla occultans (Glaw and Vences, 1992)

Synonyms
- Platypelis occultans Glaw and Vences, 1992

= Cophyla occultans =

Species of frog

Cophyla occultans is a species of frog in the family Microhylidae. It is found on Nosy Be, its type locality, and adjacent mainland in northeastern Madagascar, including Ambolokopatrika, Anjanaharibe-Sud, Manantenina, Marojejy, Sambava, and Voloina.

Cophyla occultans is an arboreal species living in rainforests. It can also occur in coffee plantations and bamboo growth where tree holes and bamboo are available.

== Bibliography ==
- Glaw, F. and Vences, M. (1994). A Field Guide to the Amphibians and Reptiles of Madagascar. Vences & Glaw Verlag, Bonn.
- Glaw, F., and Vences, M. (2007). Field Guide to the Amphibians and Reptiles of Madagascar. Third Edition. Vences and Glaw Verlag, Köln.
