= Consortium of European Taxonomic Facilities =

European research network

Introductory video about a CETAF project on data integration between botanical collections

The Consortium of European Taxonomic Facilities (CETAF) is a taxonomic research network formed by scientific institutions in Europe. It was formed in December 1996 by ten of the largest European natural history museums and botanical gardens to be a voice for taxonomy and systematic biology in Europe, to promote scientific research and access to European natural history collections, and to exploit European funding opportunities. Since then, CETAF has served as a meeting point for major European natural history museums and botanical gardens, and has initiated and played an important role in a number of projects (see Initiatives and related projects section below).

Currently, CETAF has 37 members, which constitute a total of 63 institutions spanning 22 European countries (see Members section below). One of these members, the Royal Belgian Institute of Natural Sciences, also hosts CETAF's General Secretariat. Together, CETAF institutions hold a large fraction (c. 500 million objects) of the world’s most important natural history collections.

== General Meetings ==
General Meetings with representatives of each member institution are held twice a year. The meetings are hosted by any of the member institutions and held at any of the European natural history museums or botanic gardens. Current business between the General Meetings are run by the Chair and the Steering Committee, assisted by the Secretariat.

== Initiatives and related projects ==
A number of CETAF members, or national consortia in which CETAF members play leading roles, have since 1998 received support through the European Commission's Framework Programmes to enhance transnational access to their collections, equipment and expertise.

=== CETAF initiatives ===
- SYNTHESYS (Synthesis of Systematic Resources) – A CETAF Integrated Infrastructure Initiative in EU FPVI and FPVII
- European Distributed Institute of Taxonomy (EDIT) – A CETAF network of Excellence in Taxonomy for Biodiversity and Ecosystem Research, EU FPVI, which started 1 March 2006. The project ended in 2011.
- European Journal of Taxonomy (EJT) – A peer-reviewed international journal in descriptive taxonomy, covering the eukaryotic world. (ISSN 2118-9773)
- Distributed European School of Taxonomy (DEST) – Established by EDIT

=== CETAF related research projects ===
- European Network for Biodiversity Information (ENBI) – This was the European contribution to the Global Biodiversity Information Facility (GBIF). The project was coordinated by the Zoological Museum Amsterdam, and ended in 2015.
- Biological Collection Access Service (BioCASe) – Historically, this was known as the Biological Collection Access Service for Europe (BioCASE).
- Fauna Europaea
- ICEDIG (Innovation and consolidation for large scale digitisation of natural heritage)
- EU BON (European Biodiversity Observation Network)
- BIOTALENT – a blended e-learning biodiversity training programme

== Members ==
The following is a list of members, the nations in which these members are situated, and associated institutions:

Country	Member
Albania	University of Tirana, Albania Collections based at the Research Center of Flora and Fauna
Austria	Biology Centre of Upper Austria State Museums
Austria	Natural History Museum, Vienna
Belgium	Meise Botanic Garden
Belgium	Royal Belgian Institute of Natural Sciences
Belgium	Royal Museum for Central Africa
Bulgaria	Bulgarian Consortium: Bulgarian Academy of Sciences, Institute of Biodiversity and Ecosystem Research; National Museum of Natural History
Czech Republic	Czech Consortium: Faculty of Science, Charles University in Prague; Institute of Botany, The Czech Academy of Sciences; National Museum, Prague – Natural History Museum
Denmark	Natural History Museum of Denmark
Estonia	Estonian Consortium: Estonian Academy of Sciences: Estonian Museum of Natural History; Estonian University of Life Sciences; Tallinn University of Technology; University of Tartu Natural History Museum and Botanical Garden
Finland	Finnish Museum of Natural History
France	National Museum of Natural History
Germany	Bavarian Natural History Collections
Germany	Berlin Natural History Museum
Germany	Botanic Garden and Botanical Museum Berlin
Germany	Leibniz Institute for Analysis of Biodiversity Change
Germany	Senckenberg Society for Nature Research
Germany	Stuttgart State Museum of Natural History
Germany	NORe e. V. Association of German Natural History Museums in the North Sea and Baltic Sea Region: German Oceanographic Museum Stralsund; Haus der Natur Cismar; Müritzeum; Museum of Nature and Environment Lübeck; Natural History Museum, Bielefeld; State Natural History Museum, Braunschweig; State Museum of Nature and Men Oldenburg; Übersee-Museum of Bremen; Zoological Collection of the University of Rostock; Zoological Institute and Museum Greifswald; Zoological Museum of Kiel University
Greece	Natural History Museum of Crete
Hungary	Hungarian Natural History Museum
Iceland	Natural Science Museum of Iceland
Israel	The Hebrew University of Jerusalem, National Natural History Collections
Israel	The Steinhardt Museum of Natural History, Israel National Center for Biodiversity Studies
Italy	Museum and Botanical Garden of the University of Pisa
Italy	Italian Consortium: Natural History Museum of Genova; Natural History Museum – Florence University Museum System
Latvia	University of Daugavpils
Luxembourg	National Museum of Natural History, Luxembourg
Netherlands	Naturalis Biodiversity Center
Norway	Natural History Museum, University of Oslo
Poland	Museum and Institute of Zoology, Polish Academy of Sciences
Slovakia	Slovak Consortium: Slovak National Taxonomic Facility (NaTAF): Comenius University, Faculty of Natural Sciences – Botany; Comenius University, Faculty of Natural Sciences – Zoology; Pavol Jozef Šafárik University in Košice – Faculty of Science; Slovak Academy of Sciences – Institute of Botany; Slovak Academy of Sciences – Institute of Zoology; Slovak National Museum – Museum of National History
Spain	Spanish Consortium: CSIC. National Museum of Natural Sciences; CSIC. Royal Botanic Garden of Madrid
Sweden	Swedish Museum of Natural History
Sweden	Gothenburg Consortium: Department of Biology and Environmental Sciences, University of Gothenburg; Gothenburg Botanical Garden; Gothenburg Natural History Museum
Switzerland	Natural History Museum of Bern
Switzerland	Geneva Consortium: Geneva Botanical Garden; Natural History Museum of Geneva
United Kingdom	Bristol Museum & Art Gallery
United Kingdom	London Natural History Museum
United Kingdom	Manchester Museum, The University of Manchester
United Kingdom	National Geological Repository
United Kingdom	National Museums Liverpool
United Kingdom	National Museums Northern Ireland
United Kingdom	National Museums Scotland
United Kingdom	Natural History | National Museum Wales
United Kingdom	Oxford University Museum of Natural History
United Kingdom	Royal Botanic Garden Edinburgh
United Kingdom	Royal Botanic Gardens, Kew
United Kingdom	The Hunterian, University of Glasgow
