= Stumpffia kibomena =

Conservation status
- Endangered (IUCN 3.1)

Scientific classification
- Kingdom: Animalia
- Phylum: Chordata
- Class: Amphibia
- Order: Anura
- Family: Microhylidae
- Subfamily: Cophylinae
- Genus: Stumpffia
- Species: S. kibomena

Binomial name
- Stumpffia kibomena Glaw, Vallan, Andreone, Edmonds, Dolch and Vences, 2015

Synonyms
- Rhombophryne kibomena (Glaw, Vallan, Andreone, Edmonds, Dolch, and Vences, 2015)

Species of frog

Stumpffia kibomena is a species of frog in the family Microhylidae. It is endemic to the Andasibe region of eastern Madagascar. The species is diurnal, and found in primary, secondary, and eucalyptus forests. It has not yet been assessed by the IUCN Red List.
