= Stumpffia psologlossa =

Conservation status
- Endangered (IUCN 3.1)

Scientific classification
- Kingdom: Animalia
- Phylum: Chordata
- Class: Amphibia
- Order: Anura
- Family: Microhylidae
- Subfamily: Cophylinae
- Genus: Stumpffia
- Species: S. psologlossa

Binomial name
- Stumpffia psologlossa Boettger, 1881

Synonyms
- Rhombophryne psologlossa Peloso et al., 2016

Species of frog

Stumpffia psologlossa, commonly called the Madagascar stump-toed frog, is a species of frog in the family Microhylidae. It is endemic to Madagascar. Its natural habitats are subtropical or tropical moist lowland forests, plantations, and heavily degraded former forest. It is threatened by habitat loss.
