= Stumpffia grandis =

Conservation status
- Least Concern (IUCN 3.1)

Scientific classification
- Kingdom: Animalia
- Phylum: Chordata
- Class: Amphibia
- Order: Anura
- Family: Microhylidae
- Subfamily: Cophylinae
- Genus: Stumpffia
- Species: S. grandis

Binomial name
- Stumpffia grandis Guibé, 1974

Synonyms
- Rhombophryne grandis Peloso et al., 2016

Species of frog

Stumpffia grandis is a species of frog in the family Microhylidae. It is endemic to Madagascar. Its natural habitats are subtropical or tropical moist lowland forests, subtropical or tropical moist montane forests, and heavily degraded former forest. It is threatened by habitat loss.

== Sources ==
- IUCN SSC Amphibian Specialist Group (2016). "Stumpffia grandis". IUCN Red List of Threatened Species. 2016 e.T58009A84183186. doi:10.2305/IUCN.UK.2016-1.RLTS.T58009A84183186.en.
