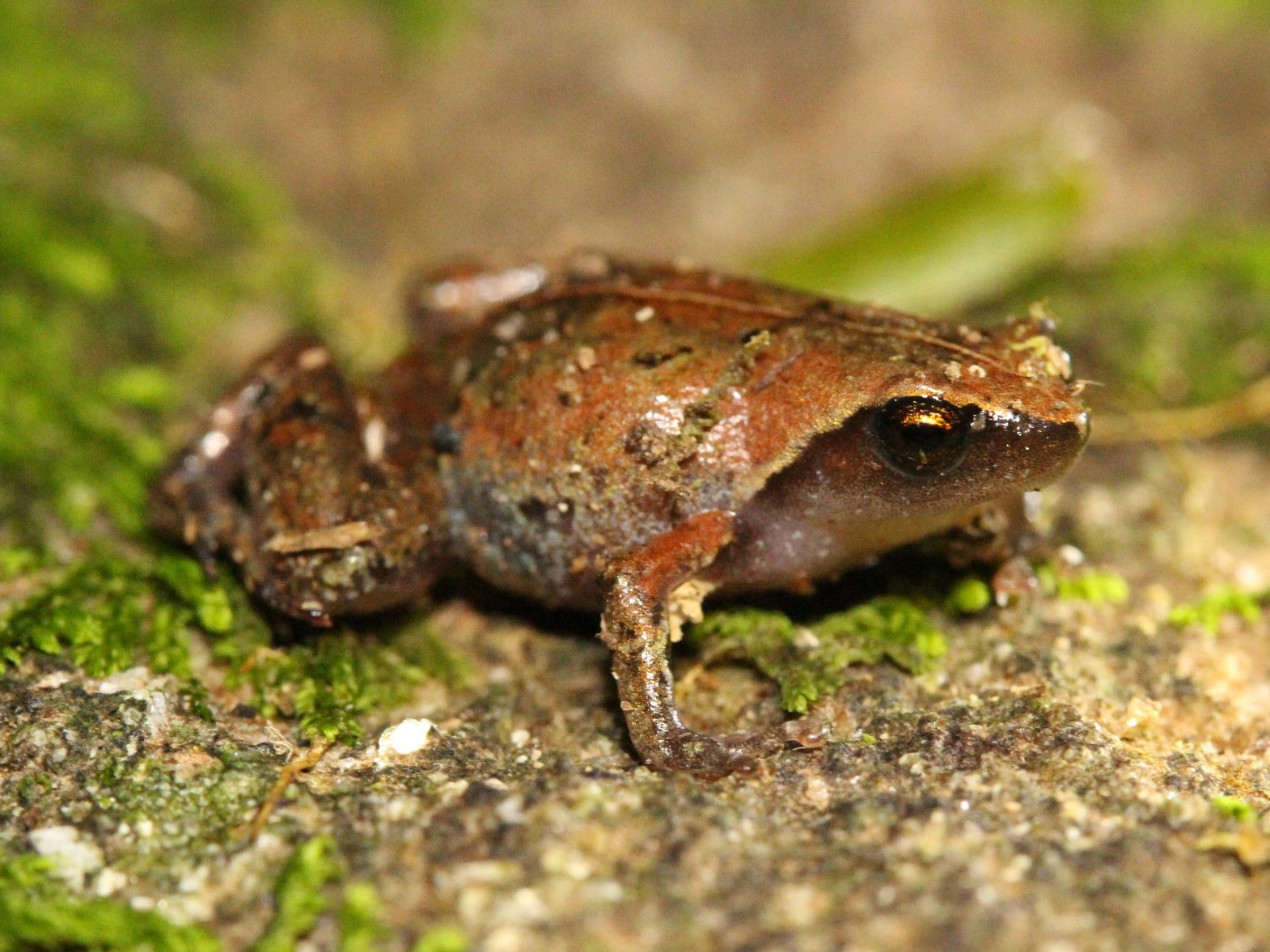

Conservation status
- Critically Endangered (IUCN 3.1)

Scientific classification
- Kingdom: Animalia
- Phylum: Chordata
- Class: Amphibia
- Order: Anura
- Family: Microhylidae
- Subfamily: Cophylinae
- Genus: Anilany; Scherz, Vences, Rakotoarison, Andreone, Köhler, Glaw & Crottini, 2016
- Species: A. helenae

Binomial name
- Anilany helenae (Vallan, 2000)
- Approximate distribution (Northern Analamanga, Madagascar) Range

Synonyms
- Stumpffia helenae Vallan, 2000; Rhombophryne helenae (Vallan, 2000)

= Anilany =

Genus of amphibians

Anilany helenae is a species of frog in the microyhlid subfamily Cophylinae. It is the only species in the monotypic genus Anilany, and is endemic to central Madagascar.

== Taxonomy ==
This species was originally described by Denis Vallan in 2000 as a member of the genus Stumpffia. It was transferred to the genus Rhombophryne by Peloso et al. in 2016 when they synonymised Stumpffia with that genus, but was then moved to the newly erected genus Anilany by Scherz et al. due to its genetic relationships and because it differs significantly in aspects of its morphology (the shape of the vomer, clavicles, and terminal phalanges of the fingers and toes).

== Habitat and Ecology ==
Its natural habitat is subtropical or tropical moist montane forests. It is threatened by habitat loss. It now occurs in a few strips of fragmented habitat near Ambohitantely in Madagascar.
