= Stumpffia gimmeli =

Conservation status
- Least Concern (IUCN 3.1)

Scientific classification
- Kingdom: Animalia
- Phylum: Chordata
- Class: Amphibia
- Order: Anura
- Family: Microhylidae
- Subfamily: Cophylinae
- Genus: Stumpffia
- Species: S. gimmeli

Binomial name
- Stumpffia gimmeli Glaw & Vences, 1992

Synonyms
- Rhombophryne gimmeli Peloso et al., 2016

Species of frog

Stumpffia gimmeli is a species of frog in the family Microhylidae. It is endemic to Madagascar. Its natural habitats are subtropical or tropical moist lowland forests, plantations, and heavily degraded former forest. This species is adaptable and can tolerate some effects of deforestation, becoming abundant in some areas.
