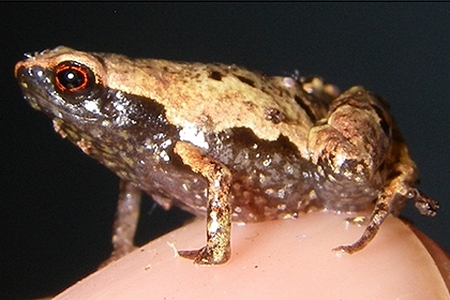
- Mini mum

Scientific classification
- Kingdom: Animalia
- Phylum: Chordata
- Class: Amphibia
- Order: Anura
- Family: Microhylidae
- Subfamily: Cophylinae
- Genus: Mini; Scherz et al., 2019

Type species
- Mini mum Scherz et al., 2019

Diversity
- 3 species

= Mini (frog) =

Genus of amphibians

Mini is a genus of tiny microhylid frogs that are endemic to southeastern Madagascar where they live among leaf litter in lowland forests. The three species and the genus itself were first scientifically described in 2019 by Mark Scherz. Although not yet rated by the IUCN, they have very small ranges and it has been recommended that two qualify as critically endangered and M. ature as data deficient.

At about 8–11.5 mm (0.31–0.45 in) in snout–vent length, M. mum and M. scule are two of the world's smallest frogs, and the larger M. ature is only c. 15 mm (0.6 in). They were formerly confused with Stumpffia, another genus of tiny frogs from Madagascar. All are well-camouflaged brown frogs.

== Species ==
The genus name is derived from English prefix "mini-", denoting a small version of an object. All the binomials names are examples of wordplay as they sound like words for small in English. There are currently 3 species:

- Mini ature Scherz et al., 2019
- Mini mum Scherz et al., 2019
- Mini scule Scherz et al., 2019

== Description ==
Diminutive terrestrial frogs (adult SVL 8.2–14.9 mm) with divided vomers, procoelous vertebral column, divided sphenethmoids, and genetic affinities. Skin smooth to slightly granular, occasionally iridescent. A lateral colour border is present but varies in intensity among species. Highly reduced fingers and toes, fusion or loss of carpal 2, and paedomorphic skull morphology: laterally displaced narrow nasals, teeth absent from vomer, in some species present on the maxilla and premaxilla, otic capsule sometimes dorsally ossified, brain case comprising most of the skull's length and width.

== Distribution and habitation ==
The genus Mini is endemic to low-elevation habitats (0–350 m a. s. l.) of southeastern Madagascar.
