= Mark Scherz =

German herpetologist and evolutionary biologist

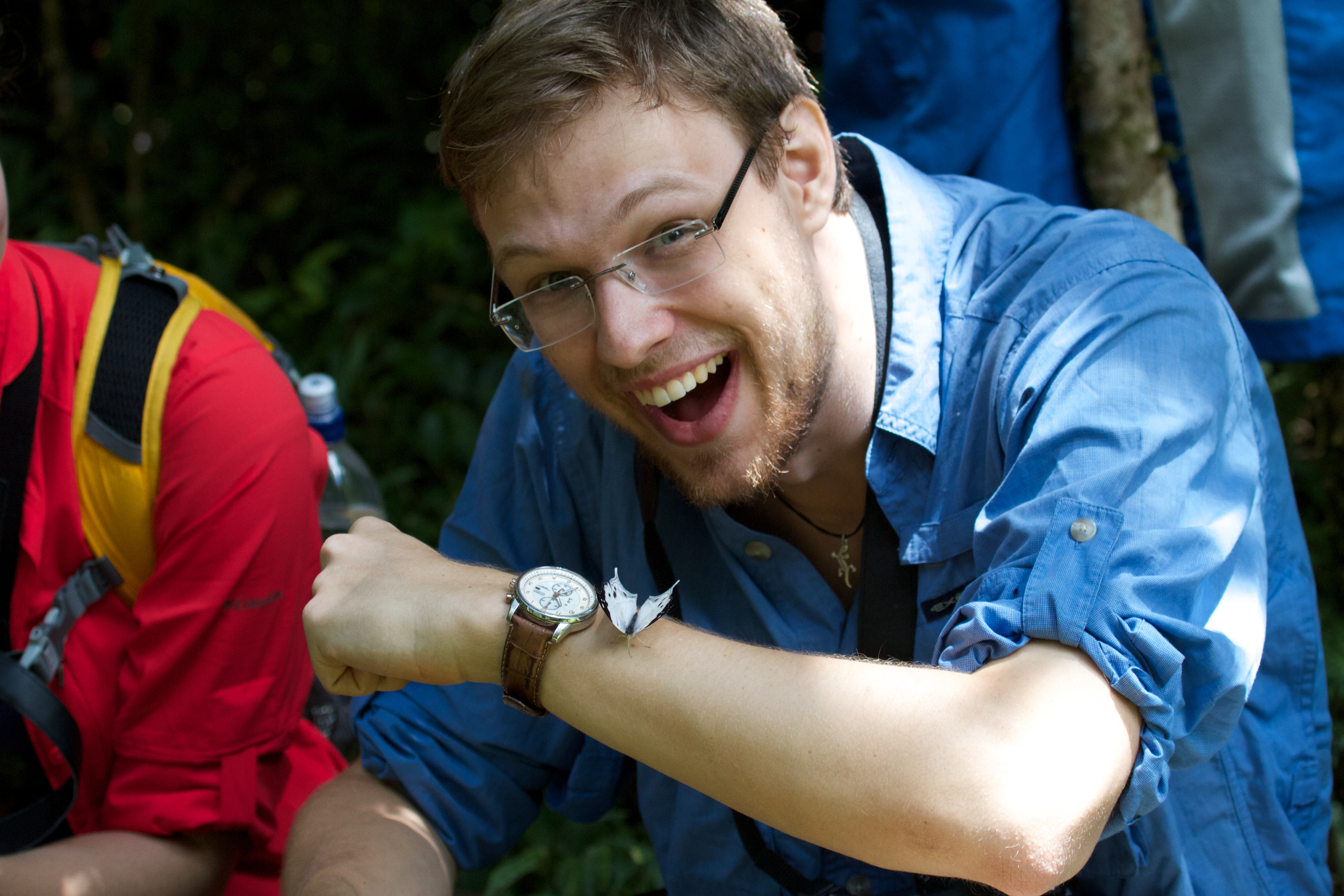
- Mark Scherz in 2014
- Born: April 17, 1991
- Education: University of Edinburgh (BS); LMU Munich (Msc); LMU Munich & TU Braunschweig (PhD)
- Awards: 2021 CETAF E-Score Award for Excellence in Research Based on Natural Science Collections; The Zoological Society of London's Charles Darwin Award and Marsh Prize
- Scientific career
- Fields: Evolutionary biology, Taxonomy, Ecology, Biological specificity
- Workplaces: Natural History Museum of Denmark, University of Copenhagen
- Doctoral advisor: Miguel Vences; Frank Glaw; Gerhard Haszprunar
- Other academic advisors: Andrew Rambaut

Mark D. Scherz (born April 17, 1991) is a herpetologist and evolutionary biologist specialising in reptiles and amphibians of Madagascar. He is currently the curator of Herpetology at the Natural History Museum of Denmark and the associate professor of vertebrate zoology at the University of Copenhagen. Through the use of museomics, micro-Computed Tomography (micro-CT), genetic sequencing and other techniques alongside field research, Scherz and his colleagues have described numerous reptile and amphibian species of Madagascar.

Notable examples of new species discovered by Scherz and his team include the scale-shedding Geckolepis megalepis and the frogs Mini ature, Mini mum, and Mini scule. They have also named newly described frog species after Star Trek characters. Scherz has emphasised the need to make science more approachable to the public.

== Education ==
Scherz received his B.Sc. in zoology from the University of Edinburgh in 2013 and was supervised by professor Andrew Rambaut. His undergraduate paper 'The Paraphyly of Ratites Just Doesn't Fly', which discussed the controversy around the evolution of flightlessness in ratite birds with the aid of molecular analysis, received the Zoological Society of London's Charles Darwin Award and Marsh Prize.

In 2014, as a graduate student at LMU Munich, Scherz analysed a 2005 specimen collected by his mentor Frank Glaw from the Marojejy Massif with modern techniques including a micro-CT scan. Data from these methods led to the description of new species, including the discovery of the narrow-mouthed frog Rhombophryne vaventy. Vaventy was chosen as it was the Malagasy word for "huge".

== Career ==
In 2017, he was a herpetologist and taxonomist at the Bavarian State Collection of Zoology research institute. He and his colleagues discovered and described Geckolepis megalepis, a newly discovered species of gecko from northern Madagascar, which was the first addition to the Geckolepis genus since 1942. The species had the largest scales of any known gecko and could detach them as a defense mechanism, which was a trait shared by other members of the genus, however Geckolepis megalepis scales were reported to shed more easily than its congeners.

In 2019, he led an international team who discovered a new genus and five new species of 'tiny frogs' from Madagascar, which all belonged to the family Microhylidae, also known as narrow-mouthed frogs. The new genus Mini was established for three of the five species, and the scientific names for the three frogs were named Mini ature, Mini mum, and Mini scule. Scherz explained that the names were chosen to pique the interest of the public and emphasised the need to make science more approachable.

In 2020, Scherz discovered Rhombophryne ellae, a new diamond frog species that was found only in the Montagne d'Ambre National Park in northern Madagascar. He cited the unique orange flash-markings on the legs and the large black spots on the hip of the species as keys to his discovery, noting that black markings were rare in this genus and there were no described species with orange legs. As Rhombophryne ellae was found when Cyclone Ava was approaching Madagascar, Scherz remarked on the possible role of poor weather leading to increased sighting and thus discovery of frog species, as several other species that his colleagues had recently described were found under similar storm conditions.

In late 2021, Scherz began work as an assistant professor of vertebrate zoology at the University of Copenhagen alongside his role as curator of herpetology at the Natural History Museum of Denmark in Copenhagen. He also received the CETAF E-Score Award for Excellence in Research Based on Natural Science Collections for his work on applying cutting-edge methods in systematics and integrative taxonomy on the subject of herpetofauna in Madagascar.

In 2022, Scherz and his colleagues named and described twenty additional species of Mantidactylus subgenus Brygoomantis (also known as the Malagasy common brown frog) using museomics. Researchers extracted and sequenced genomic data from DNA specimens in museum collections, and the information was analysed and matched with other information such as morphology and behaviour from over 1300 frogs.

In 2023, Scherz and his team published a paper describing Uroplatus garamaso, a newly identified species of leaf-tailed gecko. His team relied on decades of research on the gecko's genetics, morphology and evolutionary lineage, and a key realisation was that the tip of the gecko's tongue was black, rather than pink, as the mouth colour of Uroplatus are an important key to identifying species within the genus.

In October 2024, Scherz and his team discovered seven new frog species after realising that the species Boophis marojezensis, first discovered in 1994, was actually eight different species. Despite the near-identical morphology of the frogs, their high-pitched, whistling calls were distinct in pitch and timing between species, and this hypothesis was confirmed by DNA sequencing that demonstrated distinct genetic differences. One of the seven species is named Boophis kirki, in honour of the Star Trek character James T. Kirk, while the others are named after Jean-Luc Picard, Kathryn Janeway, Benjamin Sisko, Jonathan Archer, Christopher Pike, and Michael Burnham.

In 2024, Scherz received a grant of DKK 11 million (roughly €1.5 m) from the European Research Council, which would allow his team to further investigate miniaturisation of invertebrates over the course of five years. The new research project is named GEMINI (Genomics of Miniaturisation in Vertebrates), and intends to identify the processes that occur in vertebrate DNA over the course of miniaturisation in order to develop a genetic template of the process.

== Scientific outreach ==
Scherz and fellow German herpetologists Katharina Ruthsatz and Miguel Vences collaborate on Anatomy Insights, a YouTube channel that provides university-level education on animal anatomy, morphology and taxonomy in both English and German. He co-hosts the SquaMates podcast with scientific illustrator Gabriel Ugueto, artist Ethan Kocak, and snake researcher Hiral Naik. Scherz also runs an educational Tumblr blog.

== Personal life ==
Scherz and his partner Ella Z. Lattenkamp have one son.

== Bibliography ==
=== Journals ===
- Scherz, Mark D.; Ruthensteiner, Bernhard; Vences, Miguel; Glaw, Frank (10 September 2014). "A new microhylid frog, genus Rhombophryne, from northeastern Madagascar, and a re-description of R. serratopalpebrosa using micro-computed tomography". Zootaxa. 3860 (6): 547–560. doi:10.11646/zootaxa.3860.6.3. ISSN 1175-5334. PMID 25283290.
- Scherz, Mark D.; Daza, Juan D.; Köhler, Jörn; Vences, Miguel; Glaw, Frank (7 February 2017). "Off the scale: a new species of fish-scale gecko (Squamata: Gekkonidae: Geckolepis ) with exceptionally large scales". PeerJ. 5 e2955. doi:10.7717/peerj.2955. ISSN 2167-8359. PMC 5299998. PMID 28194313.
- Scherz, Mark D.; Hutter, Carl R.; Rakotoarison, Andolalao; Riemann, Jana C.; Rödel, Mark-Oliver; Ndriantsoa, Serge H.; Glos, Julian; Hyde Roberts, Sam; Crottini, Angelica; Vences, Miguel; Glaw, Frank (27 March 2019). "Morphological and ecological convergence at the lower size limit for vertebrates highlighted by five new miniaturised microhylid frog species from three different Madagascan genera". PLOS ONE. 14 (3) e0213314. Bibcode:2019PLoSO..1413314S. doi:10.1371/journal.pone.0213314. ISSN 1932-6203. PMC 6436692. PMID 30917162.
- Scherz, Mark D. (15 June 2020). "Diamond frogs forever: a new species of Rhombophryne Boettger, 1880 (Microhylidae, Cophylinae) from Montagne d'Ambre National Park, northern Madagascar". Zoosystematics and Evolution. 96 (2). Pensoft Publishers: 313–323. Bibcode:2020ZooEv..96..313S. doi:10.3897/zse.96.51372. ISSN 1860-0743.
- Scherz, Mark D.; Crottini, Angelica; Hutter, Carl R.; Hildenbrand, Andrea; Andreone, Franco; Fulgence, Thio Rosin; KöHler, Gunther; Ndriantsoa, Serge Herilala; Ohler, Annemarie; Preick, Michaela; Rakotoarison, Andolalao; Rancilhac, LoïS; Raselimanana, Achille P.; Riemann, Jana C.; RöDel, Mark-Oliver; Rosa, GonçAlo M.; Streicher, Jeffrey W.; Vieites, David R.; KöHler, JöRn; Hofreiter, Michael; Glaw, Frank; Vences, Miguel (15 December 2022). "An inordinate fondness for inconspicuous brown frogs: integration of phylogenomics, archival DNA analysis, morphology, and bioacoustics yields 24 new taxa in the subgenus Brygoomantis (genus Mantidactylus) from Madagascar". Megataxa. 7 (2). doi:10.11646/megataxa.7.2.1. hdl:2158/1401415. ISSN 2703-3090.
- Ruthsatz, Katharina; Scherz, Mark D.; Vences, Miguel (6 August 2021). "Dissecting the tree of life: the prospect of open-access digital resources in morphology, anatomy and taxonomy in training the next generation of zoologists". Zootaxa. 5016 (3): 448–450. doi:10.11646/zootaxa.5016.3.10. ISSN 1175-5334. PMID 34810436.
- Glaw, Frank; Jörn, Köhler; Ratsoavina, Mihaja; Raselimanana, Achille P.; Crottini, Angelica; Gehring, Philip-Sebastian; Böhme, Wolfgang; Scherz, Mark D.; Vences, Miguel (2023). "A new large-sized species of leaf-tailed gecko (Uroplatus) from northern Madagascar". Salamandra (in Italian). 59: 239–261. ISSN 0036-3375.
- Vences, Miguel; Köhler, Jörn; Hutter, Carl R.; Preick, Michaela; Petzold, Alice; Rakotoarison, Andolalao; Ratsoavina, Fanomezana M.; Glaw, Frank; Scherz, Mark D. (14 October 2024). "Communicator whistles: A Trek through the taxonomy of the Boophis marojezensis complex reveals seven new, morphologically cryptic treefrogs from Madagascar (Amphibia: Anura: Mantellidae)". Vertebrate Zoology. 74: 643–681. doi:10.3897/vz.74.e121110. ISSN 2625-8498.

=== Websites ===
- Balukjian, Brad (7 October 2014). "Meet Madagascar's Newly Discovered Huge Rhombus Frog". Discover Magazine.
- Bittel, Jason (7 February 2017). "Newly discovered gecko has a quick-release mechanism for escaping predators". The Washington Post.
- Bittel, Jason (1 February 2021). "New chameleon species may be world's smallest reptile". Animals.
- Bregel, Sarah (20 February 2024). "See the world's tiniest frogs - and why being so small is so hardd". BBC Home.
- Buehler, Jake (13 February 2024). "Brazilian flea toad may be the world's smallest vertebrate". New Scientist.
- Dasgupta, Shreya (4 March 2015). Erickson-Davis, Morgan (ed.). "Madagascar's frog haven: rich, underexplored, threatened". Conservation news.
- Donahue, Michelle Z. (27 March 2019). "New staple-size frog from Madagascar is one of the tiniest ever discovered". National Geographic.
- Eaton, Elizabeth (17 March 2017). "Detachable scales turn this gecko into an escape artist". Science News.
- "Flea toads, dwarf pygmy goby fish and bumblebee bats: Researcher aims to solve the riddle of miniature animals". EurekAlert!. 5 September 2024.
- Kwong, Emily (18 October 2024). "Meet 7 newly described frog species, all named after Star Trek characters: Short Wave". NPR.
- Schultz, Isaac (28 January 2021). "Ridiculously Tiny Chameleons Discovered in Madagascar". Gizmodo.
- "Researchers Find Coin-Sized Frogs in Madagascar". Sci.News: Breaking Science News. 1 April 2019.
- "New Species of Diamond Frog Discovered in Madagascar". Sci.News: Breaking Science News. 16 June 2020.
- Solly, Meilan (18 November 2022). "Meet 'Mini mum,' 'Mini scule' and 'Mini ature,' Three New Frog Species Among the World's Smallest". Smithsonian Magazine.
- Specktor, Brandon (30 January 2021). "World's smallest reptile fits on your fingertip". Live Science.
- Puiu, Tibi (7 February 2017). "Newly discovered 'escape artist' gecko species evades predators by shedding its scales". ZME Science.
- Quaglia, Sofia (26 December 2022). "20 New Frog Species Found in Madagascar". Discover Magazine.
- Quaglia, Sofia (25 August 2023), "This Gecko's Camouflage Is So Good, It Masqueraded as Another Species", The New York Times, ISSN 0362-4331
- Tomma, Gennaro (15 October 2024). "Seven newly named frog species make whistles that sound like Star Trek". New Scientist.
- "Marsh Charitable Trust – Charles Darwin Award and Marsh Prize". Marsh Charitable Trust. 8 June 2026.
- "E-SCoRe Award 2nd edition online ceremony: Dr. Mark D. Scherz announced the winner of this year!". Consortium of European Taxonomic Facilities - CETAF. 4 June 2021.
- "About". Dr Mark D. Scherz. 22 March 2009.
