= Museomics =

Study of genomic data from museum collections

Museomics is the study of genomic data obtained from ancient DNA (aDNA) and historic DNA (hDNA) specimens in museum collections. Early research in this area focused on short sequences of DNA from mitochondrial genes, but sequencing of whole genomes has become possible. Next-generation sequencing (NGS) and high-throughput sequencing (HTS) methods can be applied to the analysis of genetic datasets extracted from collections materials. Such techniques have been described as a "third revolution in sequencing technology". Like radiocarbon dating, the techniques of museomics are a transformative technology. Results are revising and sometimes overturning previously accepted theories about a wide variety of topics such as the domestication of the horse.

Museum collections contain unique resources such as natural history specimens, which can be used for genome-scale examinations of species, their evolution, and their responses to environmental change. Ancient DNA provides a unique window into genetic change over time. It enables scientists to directly study evolutionary and ecological processes, comparing ancient and modern populations, identifying distinct populations, and revealing patterns of change such as extinctions and migrations. Research may be used to identify isolated populations and inform conservation priorities.

However, museum specimens can be poorly preserved and are subject to degradation and contamination. Genomic analyses face considerable challenges as a result of the highly degraded DNA typical of museum specimens. DNA from such samples is often subject to post-mortem nucleotide damage such as the hydrolytic deamination of cytosine (C) to uracil (U) residues. PCR amplification of damaged templates can further substitute uracils with thymine (T), completing a C to T substitution path. Such errors tend to occur towards the ends of molecules, accumulate with time, and can be significant in specimens a century-old or later. Robust genomic and statistical techniques are needed to rigorously detect and avoid errors and genotyping uncertainties when carrying out analyses based on museum collections. Optimal methods for working with hDNA and aDNA can differ as a result of differences in their DNA degradation history.

Museomics also involves destructive sampling, irreversibly removing parts of sometimes rare specimens to obtain DNA. This can be contentious for curators and collection staff, involving a variety of ethical issues around the handling and destruction of objects, colonial acquisition and repatriation practices, and present-day social and political implications of research. Museums, universities and journals are increasingly developing ethics statements, best practices and guidelines for such work.

== See also ==
- Genomics
- Proteomics
- List of omics topics in biology
