= European Journal of Taxonomy =

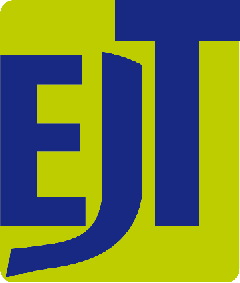
- Discipline: Taxonomy
- Language: English
- Edited by: Fabio Cianferoni

Publication details
- History: 2011–present
- Publisher: EJT Consortium
- Frequency: Continuous
- Open access: Yes
- License: CC BY 4.0
- Impact factor: 1.398 (2021)

Standard abbreviations
- ISO 4: Eur. J. Taxon.

Indexing
- ISSN: 2118-9773
- OCLC no.: 758480175

Links
- Journal homepage; Online access; Online archive

The European Journal of Taxonomy is a peer-reviewed open access scientific journal for descriptive taxonomy of living and fossil eukaryotes, covering subjects in zoology, botany, and palaeontology. It is supported by the EJT Consortium, a group of European natural history institutes, which fully funds the publication. Therefore, the journal is free for both authors and readers (diamond open access).

== History ==
The journal was initiated by a task force of people from the European Distributed Institute of Taxonomy network. The first article was published on 9 September 2011. In October 2015, the Consortium of European Taxonomic Facilities endorsed the journal.

Several older journals have been merged into the European Journal of Taxonomy:

- Journal of Afrotropical Zoology
- Bulletin de l'Institut Royal des Sciences Naturelles de Belgique, Entomologie
- Bulletin de l'Institut Royal des Sciences Naturelles de Belgique, Biologie
- Bulletin de l'Institut Royal des Sciences Naturelles de Belgique, Sciences de la Terre
- Steenstrupia
- Zoologische Mededelingen

== Abstracting and indexing ==
The journal is abstracted and indexed in:

- Biological Abstracts
- BIOSIS Previews
- CAB Abstracts
- Current Contents/Agriculture, Biology & Environmental Sciences
- Science Citation Index Expanded
- The Zoological Record

According to the Journal Citation Reports, the journal has a 2020 impact factor of 1.372.
