= Stumpffia tridactyla =

Conservation status
- Critically Endangered (IUCN 3.1)

Scientific classification
- Kingdom: Animalia
- Phylum: Chordata
- Class: Amphibia
- Order: Anura
- Family: Microhylidae
- Subfamily: Cophylinae
- Genus: Stumpffia
- Species: S. tridactyla

Binomial name
- Stumpffia tridactyla Guibé, 1975

Synonyms
- Rhombophryne tridactylus Peloso et al., 2016

Species of frog

Stumpffia tridactyla, commonly called Guibé's stump-toed frog, is a species of frog in the family Microhylidae. It is endemic to Madagascar, specifically Marojejy National Park. Its natural habitats are the forest floor and leaf litter of montane and lowland rainforests. It is threatened by habitat loss and changes to the temperature and humidity of its habitat caused by climate change.

== Description ==
Stumpffia tridactyla has a snout-vent length of 8.6–12 mm (0.34–0.47 in). It is a terrestrial microhylid frog; the average length for males is 10–11 mm (0.39–0.43 in). They are usually slow-moving, but can jump up to 20 cm when threatened.
