= Madecassophryne =

Conservation status
- Endangered (IUCN 3.1)

Scientific classification
- Kingdom: Animalia
- Phylum: Chordata
- Class: Amphibia
- Order: Anura
- Family: Microhylidae
- Subfamily: Cophylinae
- Genus: Madecassophryne; Guibé, 1974
- Species: M. truebae

Binomial name
- Madecassophryne truebae Guibé, 1974

Genus of amphibians

Madecassophryne is a monotypic genus of frogs in the family Microhylidae. It is represented by the single species, Madecassophryne truebae. It is endemic to Madagascar. Its natural habitats are subtropical or tropical moist lowland forests, subtropical or tropical moist montane forests, and rocky areas. It is threatened by habitat loss.
