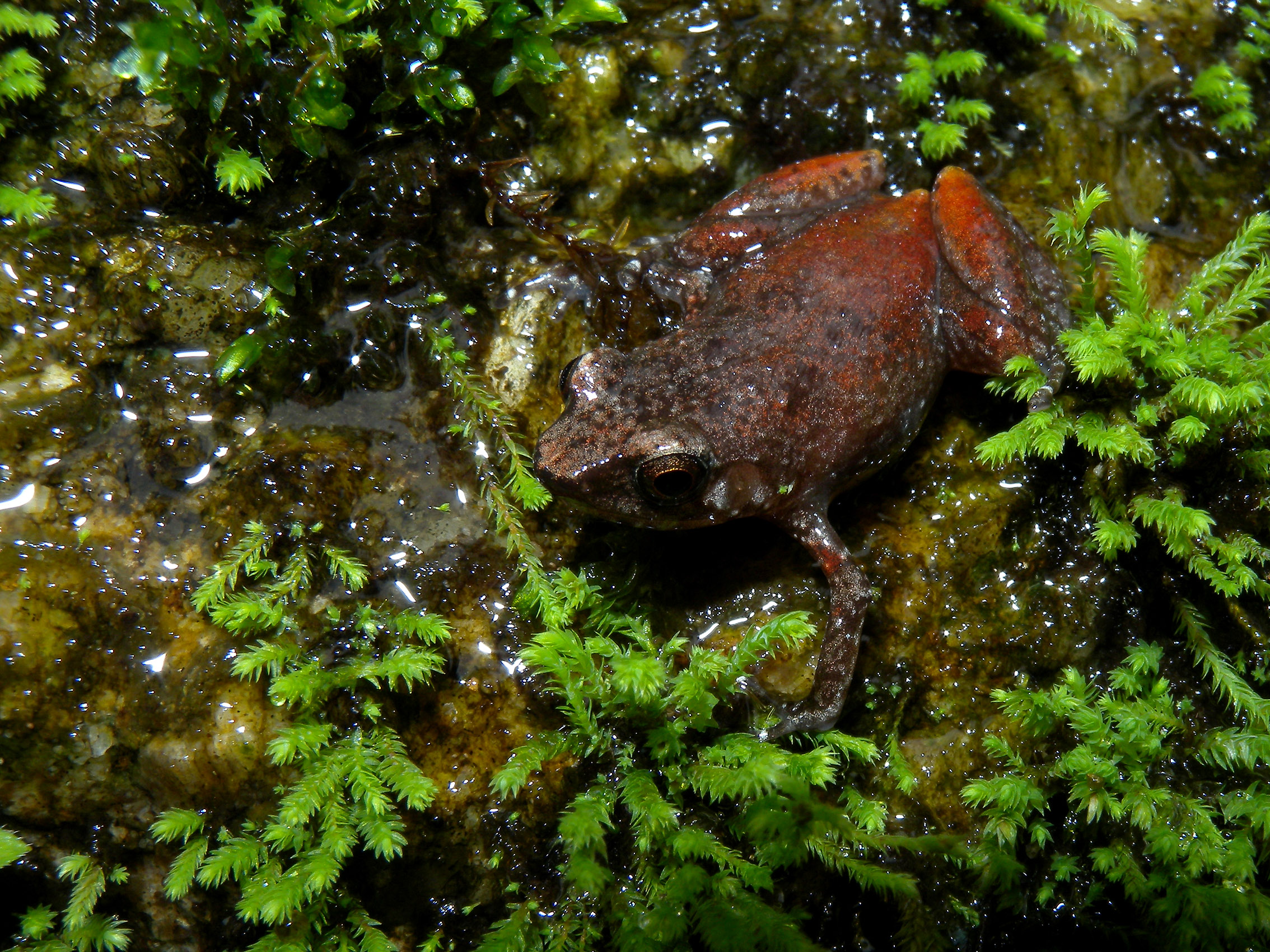
- Unidentified Stumpffia in Marojejy

Scientific classification
- Kingdom: Animalia
- Phylum: Chordata
- Class: Amphibia
- Order: Anura
- Family: Microhylidae
- Subfamily: Cophylinae
- Genus: Stumpffia; Boettger, 1881

Type species
- Stumpffia psologlossa Boettger, 1881

Diversity
- 41 species

= Stumpffia =

Genus of amphibians

Stumpffia is a genus of microhylid frogs that are endemic to Madagascar. They are mostly brown frogs that typically live among leaf litter. S. contumelia has a snout–vent length of about 8–9 mm (0.31–0.35 in), making it one of the world's smallest frogs, and several others in the genus are only slightly larger. The largest species is no more than 28 mm (1.1 in).

The majority of the species have only been described since 2010. Each species has a small range and many are seriously threatened.

== Taxonomy ==
Stumpffia was first described from the single species Stumpffia psologlossa Boettger, 1881, based on a single specimen collected on Nosy Be, a large island off the northwest coast of Madagascar, by Antonio Stumpff. By 2017, 15 species were recognised. In late 2017, a major revision of the genus was published. This study used integrative taxonomy, i.e. the combination of multiple different datasets, to delimit and describe new species: it combined morphological, morphometric, chromatic (color), bioacoustic (voice), and genetic data to provide new data on the 15 described species of Stumpffia, and describe a further 26 new species.

== Debate on synonymy with Rhombophryne ==
The genus Stumpffia was proposed to be a junior synonym of Rhombophryne in 2016, but this proposal was disputed and reversed by authors of a subsequent study, on the basis of their reciprocal monophyly and consistent morphological differences between the two genera that allow them to be distinguished. The latter study established a new genus, Anilany for "Stumpffia" helenae, a species that would otherwise have rendered Stumpffia paraphyletic, and which is morphologically and genetically highly distinct from any species of Rhombophryne or Stumpffia.

This debate was continued in 2017, with one group of authors continuing to advocate for synonymy of these two genera plus Anilany, while the other group of authors continued to advocate for separate treatment of these genera based on their monophyly and morphological distinction allowing them to be distinguished with comparative ease. There was a temporary impasse, wherein the Amphibian Species of the World database continued to adopt the single-genus taxonomy, and as a result, so too did the IUCN Red List of Endangered Species and other online databases (e.g. iNaturalist) that draw from that resource. Meanwhile, AmphibiaWeb continued to use the three-genus taxonomy, as did the taxonomists working on cophyline systematics, and other groups working more broadly on frog evolution and taxonomy.

In March 2019, a new genus, Mini, was described for the miniaturised frogs previously confused with Stumpffia that are more closely related to Plethodontohyla. Evidence in this study, as well as that presented in a paper by Na Tu et al. in 2018, helped to clarify the taxonomic situation, and the Amphibian Species of the World database reverted to treating Rhombophryne, Anilany, and Stumpffia as valid genera.

== Species ==
There are over 40 currently recognised species:

- Stumpffia achillei Rakotoarison et al., 2017
- Stumpffia analamaina Klages et al., 2013
- Stumpffia analanjirofo Rakotoarison et al., 2017
- Stumpffia angeluci Rakotoarison et al., 2017
- Stumpffia be Köhler, Vences, D'Cruze, and Glaw, 2010
- Stumpffia betampona Rakotoarison et al., 2017
- Stumpffia bishopi Rakotoarison, Glaw, Rasolonjatovo, Razafindraibe, Vences, and Scherz, 2022
- Stumpffia contumelia Rakotoarison et al., 2017
- Stumpffia davidattenboroughi Rakotoarison et al., 2017, named after David Attenborough
- Stumpffia diutissima Rakotoarison et al., 2017
- Stumpffia dolchi Rakotoarison et al., 2017
- Stumpffia edmondsi Rakotoarison et al., 2017
- Stumpffia froschaueri Crottini et al., 2020, named after Christoph Froschauer
- Stumpffia fusca Rakotoarison et al., 2017
- Stumpffia garraffoi Rakotoarison et al., 2017
- Stumpffia gimmeli Glaw and Vences, 1992
- Stumpffia grandis Guibé, 1974
- Stumpffia hara Köhler, Vences, D'Cruze, and Glaw, 2010
- Stumpffia huwei Rakotoarison et al., 2017
- Stumpffia iharana Rakotoarison et al., 2017
- Stumpffia jeannoeli Rakotoarison et al., 2017
- Stumpffia kibomena Glaw et al., 2015
- Stumpffia larinki Rakotoarison et al., 2017
- Stumpffia lynnae Mullin, Rakotomanga, Dawson, Glaw, Rakotoarison, Orozco-terWengel, and Scherz, 2022
- Stumpffia madagascariensis Mocquard, 1895
- Stumpffia makira Rakotoarison et al., 2017
- Stumpffia maledicta Rakotoarison et al., 2017
- Stumpffia mamitika Rakotoarison et al., 2017
- Stumpffia megsoni Köhler, Vences, D'Cruze, and Glaw, 2010
- Stumpffia meikeae Rakotoarison et al., 2017
- Stumpffia miery Ndriantsoa et al., 2013
- Stumpffia miovaova Rakotoarison et al., 2017
- Stumpffia nigrorubra Rakotoarison et al., 2017
- Stumpffia obscoena Rakotoarison et al., 2017
- Stumpffia pardus Rakotoarison et al., 2017
- Stumpffia psologlossa Boettger, 1881
- Stumpffia pygmaea Vences and Glaw, 1991
- Stumpffia roseifemoralis Guibé, 1974
- Stumpffia sorata Rakotoarison et al., 2017
- Stumpffia spandei Rakotoarison, et al., 2017
- Stumpffia staffordi Köhler, Vences, D'Cruze, and Glaw, 2010
- Stumpffia tetradactyla Vences and Glaw, 1991
- Stumpffia tridactyla Guibé, 1975
- Stumpffia yanniki Rakotoarison et al., 2017

The taxon "Stumpffia helenae" Vallan, 2000 was transferred to Anilany and therefore does not appear on this list.
