= Andolalao Rakotoarison =

Malagasy Herpetologist

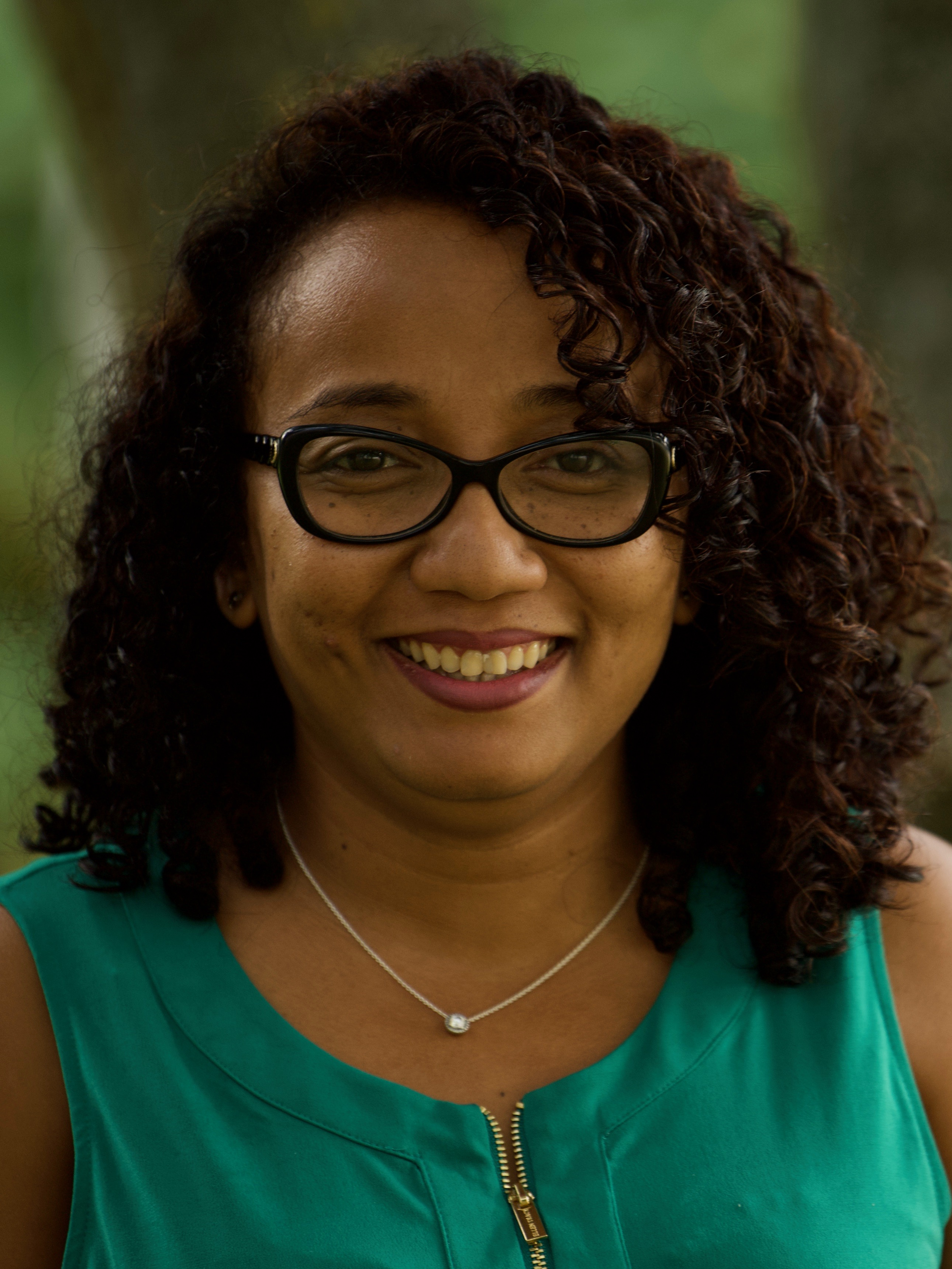
- Born: 1982 (age 43–44); Mahajanga, Madagascar
- Education: Technical University of Braunschweig
- Scientific career
- Fields: Herpetology
- Thesis: Integrative systematics of the narrow-mouthed frogs of Madagascar (Amphibia: Microhylidae: Cophylinae) (2017)
- Doctoral advisor: Miguel Vences

Andolalao Rakotoarison (born 1982 in Mahajanga) is a Malagasy herpetologist.

== Life and research ==
Rakotoarison conducted her Master's thesis at the University of Antananarivo in 2011. She then conducted her PhD at the Technical University of Braunschweig on the systematics of the frogs of the Madagascar-endemic narrow-mouthed frog subfamily Cophylinae, under the supervision of Professor Miguel Vences. As of mid-2020, she has co-authored the description of 52 frog species and two reptiles (one gecko and one chameleon). In particular, Rakotoarison has contributed to knowledge of Madagascar's smallest frogs. In 2017, she led a study published as a monograph with sixteen other coauthors, describing 26 new species of the genus Stumpffia, including several frogs that number among the smallest in the world, and in 2020, she was also involved in the description of five more miniaturised frogs, including the new genus Mini and its three diminutive species.

After completing her PhD thesis in 2017, Rakotoarison was appointed as a lecturer at Soavinandriana in Itasy, Madagascar, an affiliate of the University of Antananrivo. In 2017 she also became co-chair of the IUCN SSC Amphibian Specialist Group for Madagascar, a position she still holds today. Currently, Rakotoarison is the Academic Director for the 'Madagascar: Biodiversity and Natural Resource Management' study abroad programme of the SIT Graduate Institute.

== Matronyms ==
In 2019, the frog species Platypelis ando was named in honour of Rakotoarison in recognition of her contributions to research on the amphibians of Madagascar.
