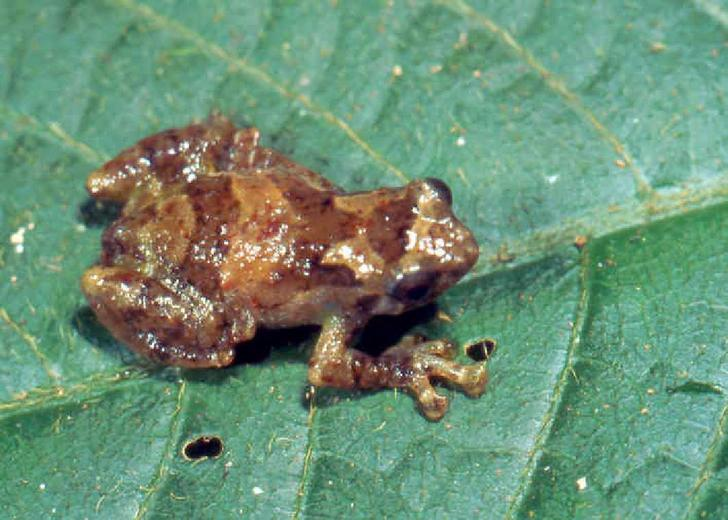
- Cophyla occultans

Scientific classification
- Kingdom: Animalia
- Phylum: Chordata
- Class: Amphibia
- Order: Anura
- Family: Microhylidae
- Subfamily: Cophylinae
- Genus: Cophyla; Boettger, 1880

Type species
- Cophyla phyllodactyla Boettger, 1880

Diversity
- 21 species

Synonyms
- Platypelis Boulenger, 1882

= Cophyla =

Genus of amphibians

Cophyla is a genus of microhylid frogs endemic to Madagascar.

== Species ==
The following species are recognised in the genus Cophyla:

- Cophyla alticola (Guibé, 1974)
- Cophyla ando (Scherz, Köhler, Vences, and Glaw, 2019)
- Cophyla barbouri (Noble, 1940)
- Cophyla berara Vences, Andreone, and Glaw, 2005
- Cophyla cowanii (Boulenger, 1882)
- Cophyla fortuna Rakotoarison, Scherz, Bletz, Razafindraibe, Glaw, and Vences, 2019
- Cophyla grandis (Boulenger, 1889)
- Cophyla karenae (Rosa, Crottini, Noel, Rabibisoa, Raxworthy, and Andreone, 2014)
- Cophyla laetus (Rakotoarison, Scherz, Köhler, Ratsoavina, Hawlitschek, Megson, Vences & Glaw, 2020)
- Cophyla maharipeo Rakotoarison, Crottini, Müller, Rödel, Glaw, and Vences, 2015
- Cophyla mavomavo (Andreone, Fenolio, and Walvoord, 2003)
- Cophyla milloti (Guibé, 1950)
- Cophyla noromalalae Rakotoarison, Crottini, Müller, Rödel, Glaw, and Vences, 2015
- Cophyla occultans (Glaw and Vences, 1992)
- Cophyla olgae (Rakotoarison, Glaw, Vieites, Raminosoa, and Vences, 2012)
- Cophyla phyllodactyla Boettger, 1880
- Cophyla pollicaris (Boulenger, 1888)
- Cophyla puellarum Rakotoarison, Crottini, Müller, Rödel, Glaw, and Vences, 2015
- Cophyla rava (Glaw, Köhler, and Vences, 2012)
- Cophyla tetra (Andreone, Fenolio, and Walvoord, 2003)
- Cophyla tsaratananaensis Guibé, 1974
- Cophyla tuberifera (Methuen, 1920)
