= Femoral gland =

Type of gland found in some amphibians

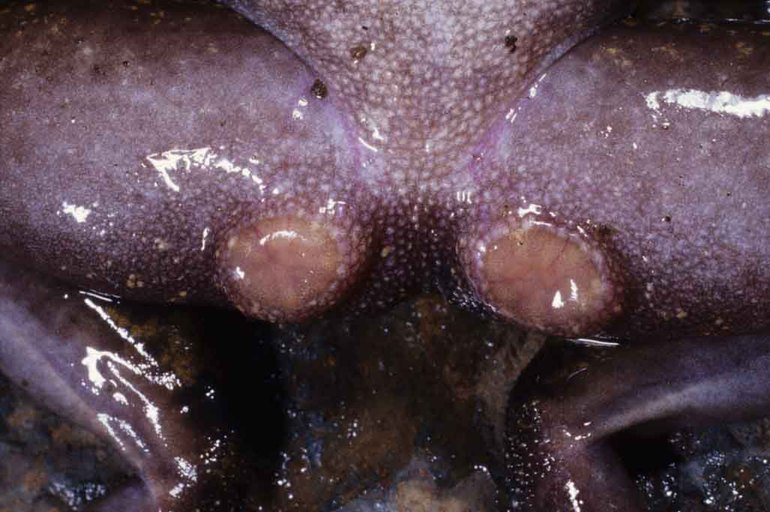
Femoral glands are prominent here on the ventral side of the hindlimbs of Mantidactylus grandidieri.

The femoral gland is a specialised gland found in some male frogs that plays a role in chemical communication and reproductive signalling. Particularly prominent within the frog family Mantellidae, these glands are located on the underside of the hindlimbs, usually on the inner thighs or shanks. Femoral glands can be identified by their swollen appearance and distinct colouration, which differ from the surrounding skin. Femoral glands are classified into four distinct morphological types, varying from minute granular structures to conspicuous patches characterised by large granules and prominent central indentations.

Femoral glands in certain frogs, particularly in the subfamily Mantellinae, are implicated in reproductive signalling and species recognition, affecting behaviours like oviposition. These glands, which develop early in species like Nyctibatrachus major, are subject to hormonal and environmental influences. Unlike the amplexus (sexual clasp) observed in other anuran frogs, Mantellinae males employ these glands in a unique, loose mating clasp. The volatile organic compounds secreted by the glands serve a chemical communication role that influences mating behaviour. Research indicates that compounds from femoral glands in mantellid frogs can specifically activate olfactory neurons, responsible for detecting and transmitting odour signals to the brain. Structural variations in the femoral glands assist in the taxonomic differentiation of some frog species and genera.

== Characteristics ==
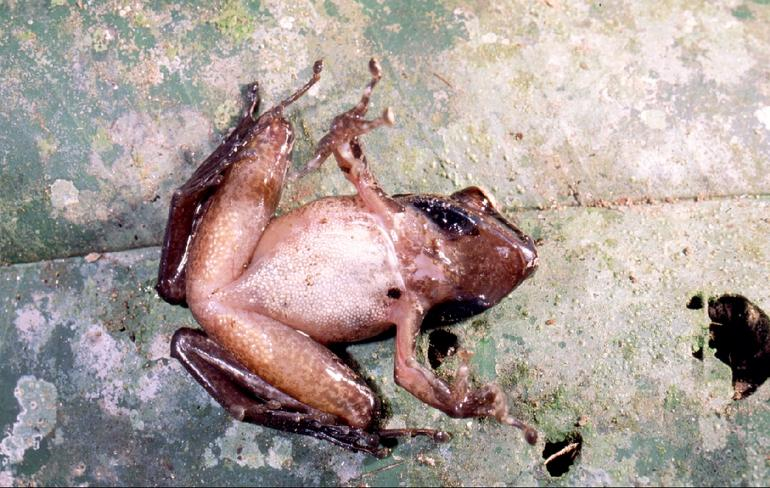
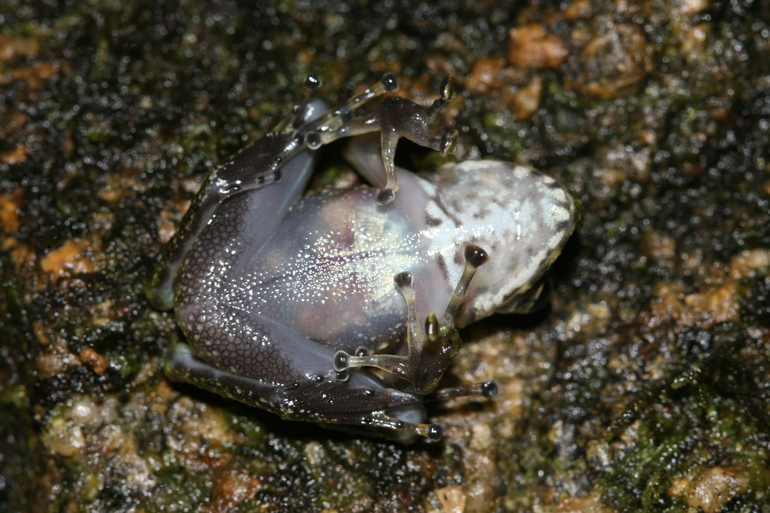
Gephyromantis salegy (top) and Gephyromantis webbi have "Type 2" femoral glands, which are typical of most other Gephyromantis species.

Femoral glands can be identified by their swollen appearance and distinct colouration, which typically differ from the surrounding skin. In the family Mantellidae, four structural types of femoral glands have been documented, ranging from tiny granules to well-defined patches with large granules and central depressions:

- Type 1: A patch of densely packed small granules without defined edges, specific to Guibemantis species, with G. liber having more distinct edges. Towards the edges of the gland patch they are increasingly arranged in small rosette-like groups—with five to seven granules surrounding one central granule.
- Type 2: A single group of moderate-sized granules forming an ovoid patch, found in Blommersia, Pandanusicola, Spinomantis, Gephyromantis, and Phylacomantis.
- Type 3: A prominent, rounded structure with a central depression surrounded by large granules and a secondary group of smaller granules, reduced in M. brevipalmatus, occurring in the genus Brygoomantis and subgenera Ochthomantis, Hylobatrachus, and Chonomantis.
- Type 4: Similar to type 3 but lacking the secondary group of granules, seen in the genus Mantidactylus.

In addition to their prevalence in the family Mantellidae, femoral glands are also found in some species in several frog genera: Indirana (family Ranixalidae), Nyctibatrachus (Nyctibatrachidae), Petropedetes (Petropedetidae), and Phrynobatrachus (Phrynobatrachidae).

== Function and evolution ==
Femoral glands in mantelline frogs are used by males for secreting chemical compounds important in territory marking and attracting mates. Some of these chemicals display double bond isomerism, meaning the molecules, while similar in composition, differ in the arrangement of their double bonds. This difference in structure, as seen in molecules like the gephyromantolide A (a macrocyclic lactone) from Gephyromantis boulengeri compared to its counterpart in Hyperolius cinnamomeoventris, results in distinct chemical signals for each species. This specificity in chemical messaging aids in mating and species recognition, reducing mating between different species by using different isomers. This kind of molecular specificity, while not exclusive to amphibians, is less common in the animal kingdom and has been predominantly observed in insects. It helps ensure accurate mate identification during courtship.

The emergence of femoral glands in amphibians is attributed to convergent evolution, with their independent appearance across different clades of ranoid frogs likely due to the expansion and specialization of granular glands in the skin of the ventral shank. The Dutch herpetologist Blommers-Schlösser regarded these glands as an ancestral trait within the Mantellidae, supporting a phylogenetic standpoint that views the family as a descendant of the early rhacophorid lineage.

== Reproductive significance ==
During mating, the femoral glands' placement on the male's ventral surface of the thigh suggests that they may contact the female's dorsal skin, implicating the glands in reproductive signalling. Gland secretions may influence female behaviour, potentially stimulating oviposition and aiding intra-species recognition. The variation of the femoral glands in the species Nyctibatrachus major may reflect hormonal regulation akin to thumb pad elaboration, a common secondary sex characteristic in male frogs. The size and function of femoral glands in N. major show seasonality and a correlation with reproductive activity, paralleling the strict seasonal changes in the Western Ghats environment. The presence of femoral glands in males of this species with small snout–vent lengths indicates that the development of these glands begins at a relatively early stage.

The role of femoral glands in facilitating amplexus (the mating clasp) among hill-stream anurans such as N. major has been proposed. While these glands do not seem to be involved in the typical amplexus seen in Ranidae and Rhacophoridae, they are related to a more relaxed form of mating embrace. In this unique mating behaviour, observed solely in Mantellinae, males may drape their thighs over the female's head and shoulders if arboreal, or clasp the female briefly and loosely around the waist if terrestrial, with the mating grasp lasting only from a few seconds to minutes.

== Biochemical diversity ==
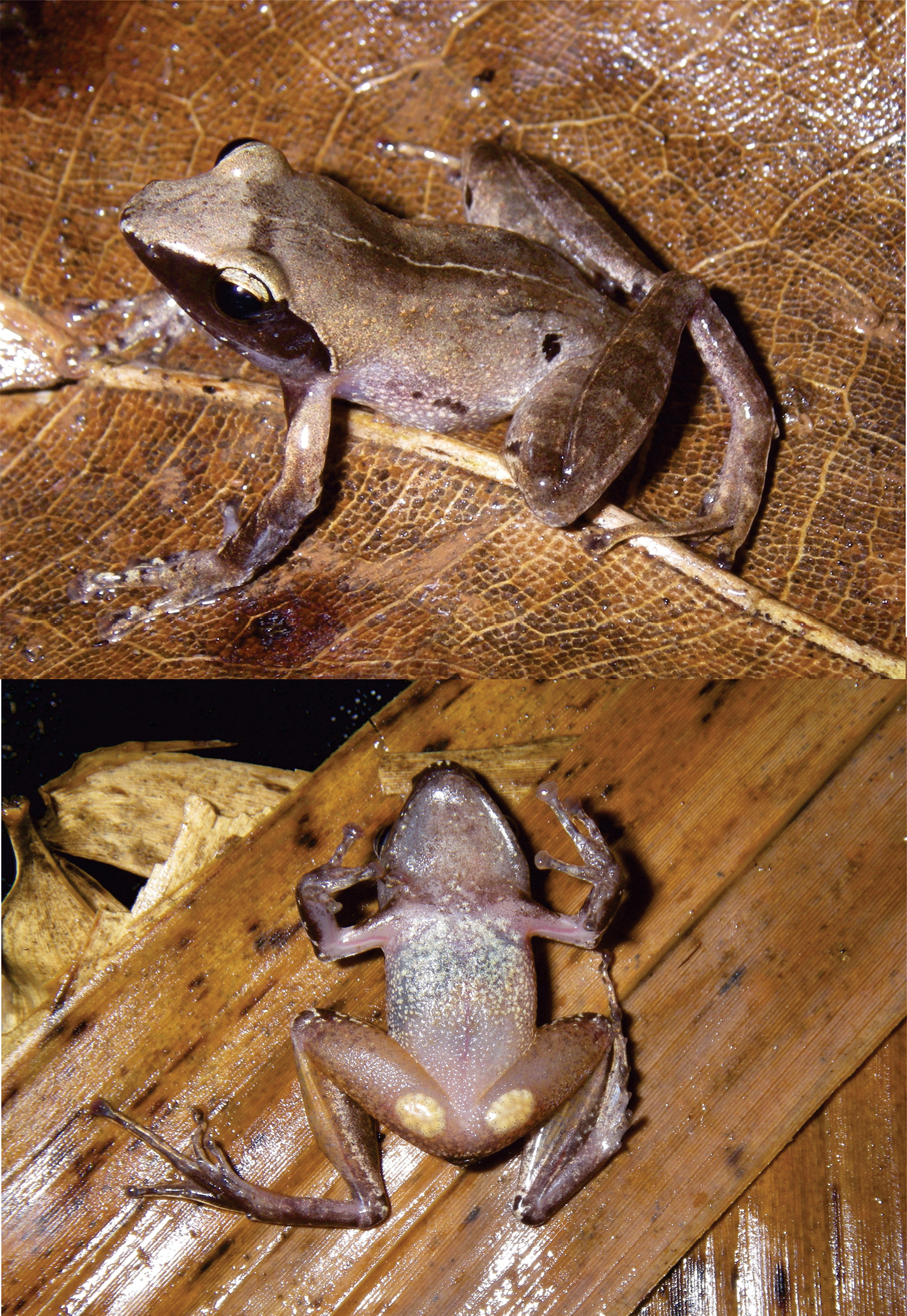
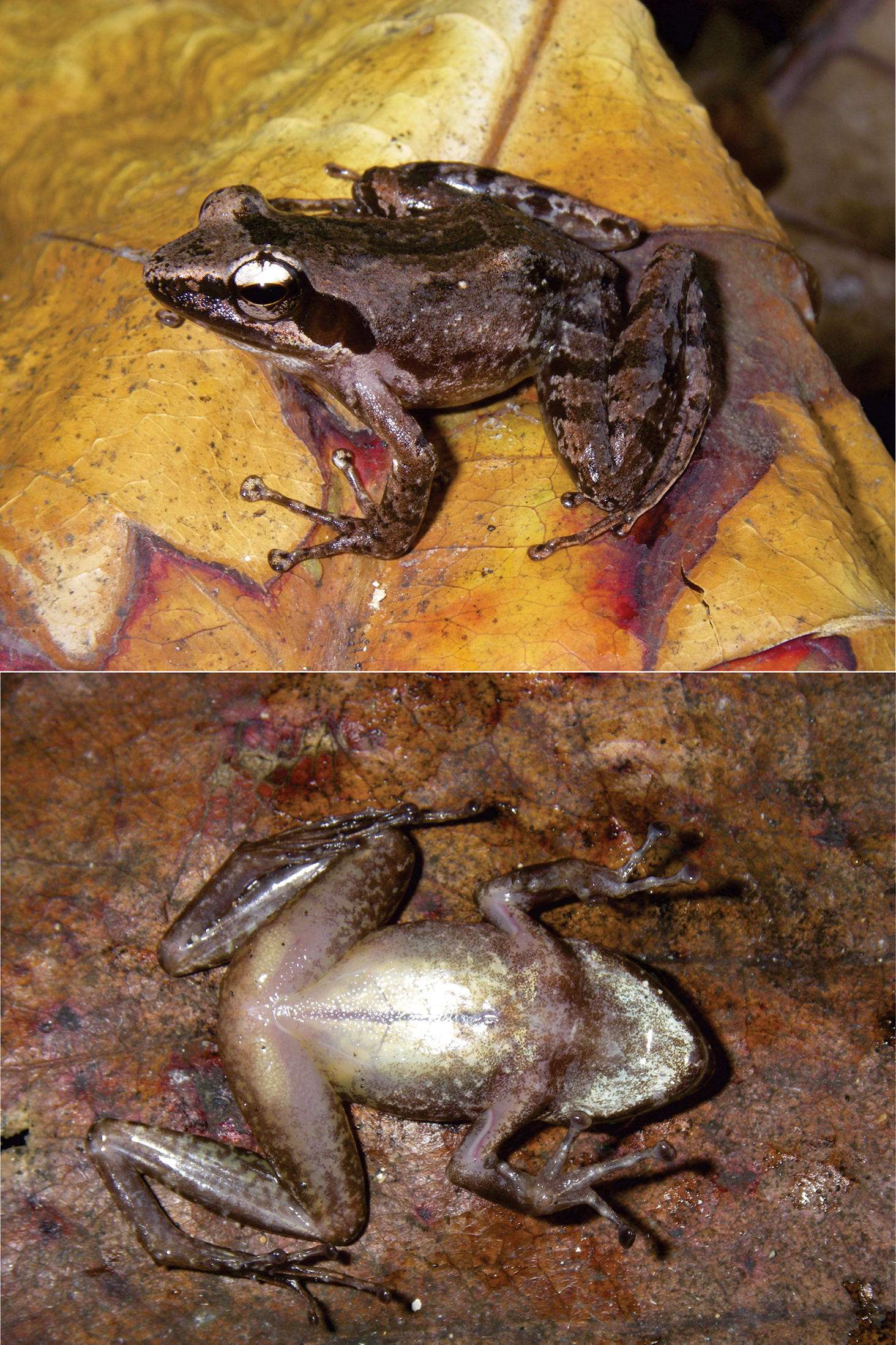
Dorsolateral (top) and ventral (botton) views of Blommersia nataliae (left), and the closely related B. transmarina (right). The colour and shape of the femoral glands help to distinguish these species.

Research has uncovered a vast diversity of volatile compounds that are produced in the femoral glands across many species within the subfamily Mantellinae, indicating a complex chemical communication system not directly correlated with gland size or prominence. For instance, in the Madagascar-native frog Mantidactylus betsileanus, macrolide compounds produced by the femoral glands stimulate female attraction and generally heighten activity in both genders. A suspected pheromone from M. betsileanus, the macrolide phoracantholide J, has the ability to activate specific smell-sensitive sensory neurons in the olfactory region of the brain. Meanwhile, it appears not to affect the secondary smelling system, known as the vomeronasal organ. This separation of functions is a specialised trait that has developed alongside the presence of femoral glands in mantellid frogs.

== History and taxonomic utility ==
In 1909, the French herpetologist François Mocquard in 1909 first proposed using the presence and structure of the femoral gland as a taxonomic character in distinguishing species in genus Mantidactylus. This character has since been recognised for its utility as a trait in classifying amphibian species, and modern species descriptions often give morphometric parameters such as FGL (femoral gland length), FGW (femoral gland width), FGD (distance between femoral glands on opposite thighs).

The distinct count of granules in the femoral gland serves as a key feature to distinguish species within the subgenus Laurentomantis. Gephyromantis marokoroko, for example, is easily identified by its eight prominent granules in each femoral gland, setting it apart from other species in the subgenus. In contrast, a 2011 taxonomic review of the genus Nyctibatrachus determined the presence of male femoral glands to be an unreliable characteristic for diagnosis due to their inconsistent seasonal prominence.
