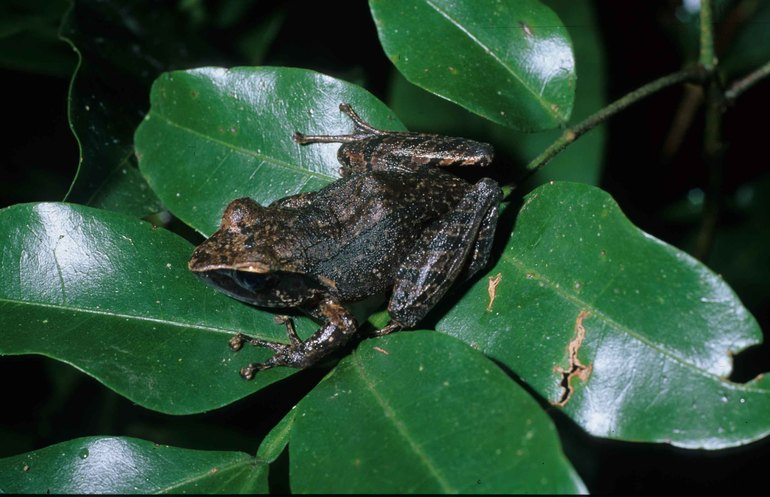

Conservation status
- Endangered (IUCN 3.1)

Scientific classification
- Kingdom: Animalia
- Phylum: Chordata
- Class: Amphibia
- Order: Anura
- Family: Mantellidae
- Genus: Gephyromantis
- Subgenus: Gephyromantis (Duboimantis)
- Species: G. zavona

Binomial name
- Gephyromantis zavona Vences, Andreone, Glaw & Randrianirina, 2002

= Gephyromantis zavona =

Species of amphibian

Gephyromantis zavona, commonly known as the Antsahamarana Madagascar frog, is a species of frog in the family Mantellidae. It is endemic to Madagascar. Its natural habitat is subtropical or tropical moist lowland forests. It is threatened by habitat loss.
