= Gephyromantis rivicola =

Conservation status
- Vulnerable (IUCN 3.1)

Scientific classification
- Kingdom: Animalia
- Phylum: Chordata
- Class: Amphibia
- Order: Anura
- Family: Mantellidae
- Genus: Gephyromantis
- Subgenus: Gephyromantis (Vatomantis)
- Species: G. rivicola

Binomial name
- Gephyromantis rivicola Vences, Glaw & Andreone, 1997

Species of amphibian

Gephyromantis rivicola, commonly known as the lesser stream Madagascar frog, is a species of frog in the family Mantellidae. It is endemic to Madagascar. Its natural habitat is subtropical or tropical moist lowland forests. It is threatened by habitat loss.
