= Gephyromantis striatus =

Conservation status
- Vulnerable (IUCN 3.1)

Scientific classification
- Kingdom: Animalia
- Phylum: Chordata
- Class: Amphibia
- Order: Anura
- Family: Mantellidae
- Genus: Gephyromantis
- Subgenus: Gephyromantis (Laurentomantis)
- Species: G. striatus

Binomial name
- Gephyromantis striatus Vences, Glaw, Andreone, Jesu & Schimmenti, 2002

Species of amphibian

Gephyromantis striatus, commonly known as the wrinkled Madagascar frog, is a species of frog in the family Mantellidae. It is endemic to Madagascar. Its natural habitats are subtropical or tropical moist lowland forests and rivers. It is threatened by habitat loss.
