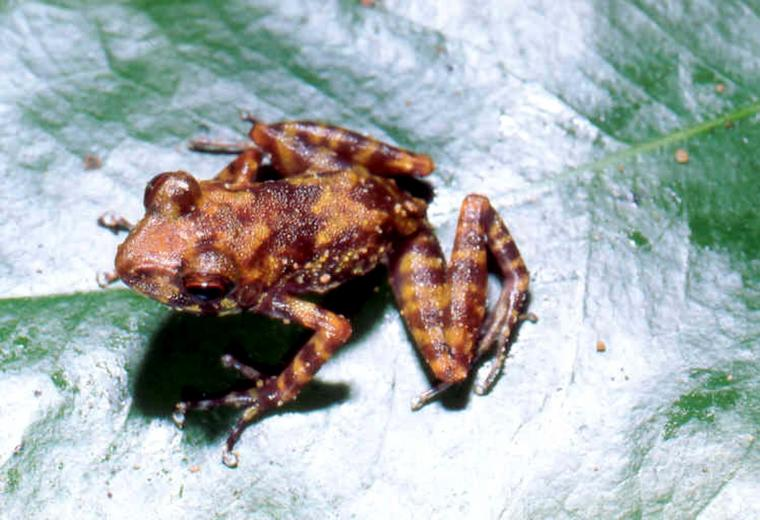

Conservation status
- Vulnerable (IUCN 3.1)

Scientific classification
- Kingdom: Animalia
- Phylum: Chordata
- Class: Amphibia
- Order: Anura
- Family: Mantellidae
- Genus: Gephyromantis
- Subgenus: Gephyromantis (Vatomantis)
- Species: G. silvanus

Binomial name
- Gephyromantis silvanus Vences, Glaw & Andreone, 1997

= Gephyromantis silvanus =

Species of amphibian

Gephyromantis silvanus, commonly known as the Madagascar frog, is a species of frogs in the family Mantellidae. It is endemic to Madagascar. Its natural habitats are subtropical or tropical moist lowland forest and rivers. It is threatened by habitat loss.
