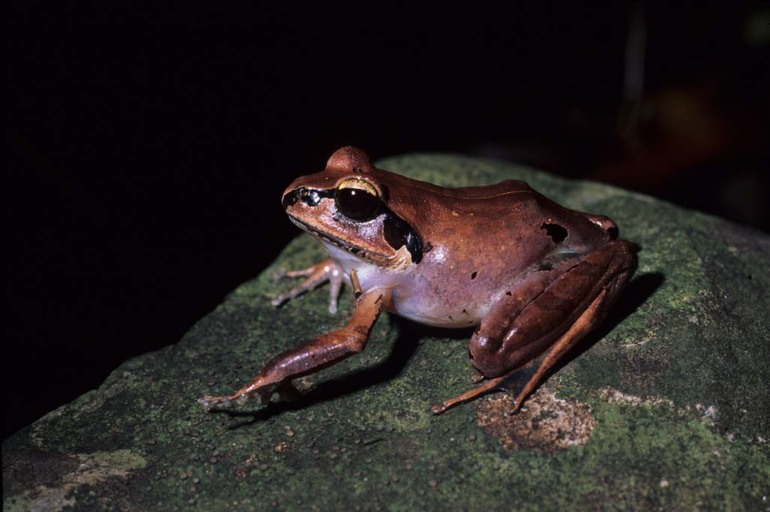

Conservation status
- Least Concern (IUCN 3.1)

Scientific classification
- Kingdom: Animalia
- Phylum: Chordata
- Class: Amphibia
- Order: Anura
- Family: Mantellidae
- Genus: Aglyptodactylus
- Species: A. securifer

Binomial name
- Aglyptodactylus securifer Glaw, Vences, Böhme, 1998

= Aglyptodactylus securifer =

Species of frog

Aglyptodactylus securifer is a species of frog in the family Mantellidae. It is endemic to Madagascar, where it lives in forests.

This species was described to science in 1998. Its upper surfaces are silver-gray to beige in color with gray bands on the legs. The undersides are yellow and the belly is white. The eyes are golden yellow with black pupils.
