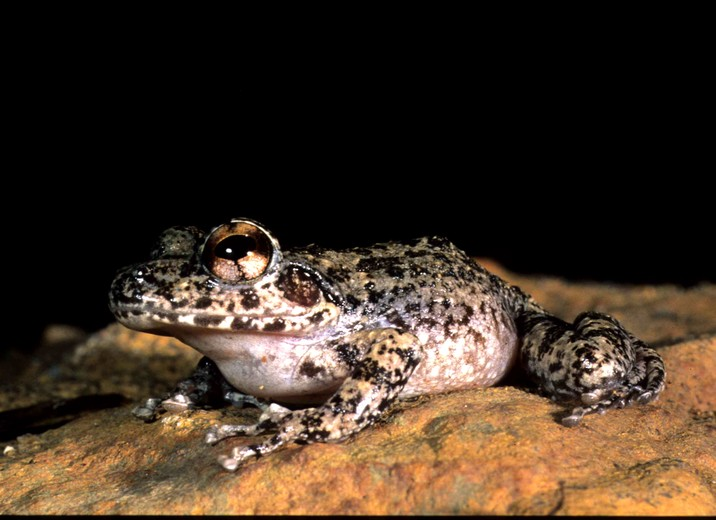

Conservation status
- Endangered (IUCN 3.1)

Scientific classification
- Kingdom: Animalia
- Phylum: Chordata
- Class: Amphibia
- Order: Anura
- Family: Mantellidae
- Genus: Gephyromantis
- Subgenus: Gephyromantis (Phylacomantis)
- Species: G. corvus

Binomial name
- Gephyromantis corvus Glaw & Vences, 1994

= Gephyromantis corvus =

Species of amphibian

Gephyromantis corvus, commonly known as the Isalo Madagascar frog, is a species of frog in the family Mantellidae. It is endemic to Madagascar. Its natural habitats are subtropical or tropical dry forests and rivers. It is threatened by loss of habitat.
