= Gephyromantis ambohitra =

Conservation status
- Vulnerable (IUCN 3.1)

Scientific classification
- Kingdom: Animalia
- Phylum: Chordata
- Class: Amphibia
- Order: Anura
- Family: Mantellidae
- Genus: Gephyromantis
- Species: G. ambohitra

Binomial name
- Gephyromantis ambohitra (Vences & Glaw, 2001)

Species of amphibian

Gephyromantis ambohitra, commonly known as the Montagne d'Ambre Madagascar frog, is a species of frog in the family Mantellidae. It is endemic to Madagascar. Its natural habitats are subtropical or tropical moist lowland forests and subtropical or tropical moist montane forests. It is threatened by habitat loss.
