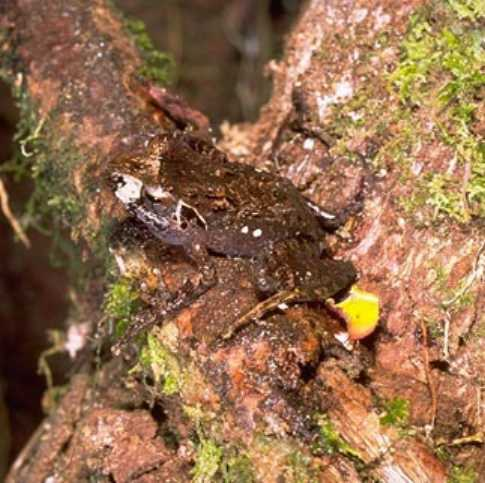

Conservation status
- Least Concern (IUCN 3.1)

Scientific classification
- Kingdom: Animalia
- Phylum: Chordata
- Class: Amphibia
- Order: Anura
- Family: Mantellidae
- Genus: Gephyromantis
- Subgenus: Gephyromantis (Duboimantis)
- Species: G. moseri

Binomial name
- Gephyromantis moseri Glaw & Vences, 2002

= Gephyromantis moseri =

Species of amphibian

Gephyromantis moseri, commonly known as Moser's Madagascar frog, is a species of frog in the family Mantellidae. It is endemic to Madagascar. Its natural habitats are subtropical or tropical moist lowland forests and rivers. It is threatened by habitat loss.
