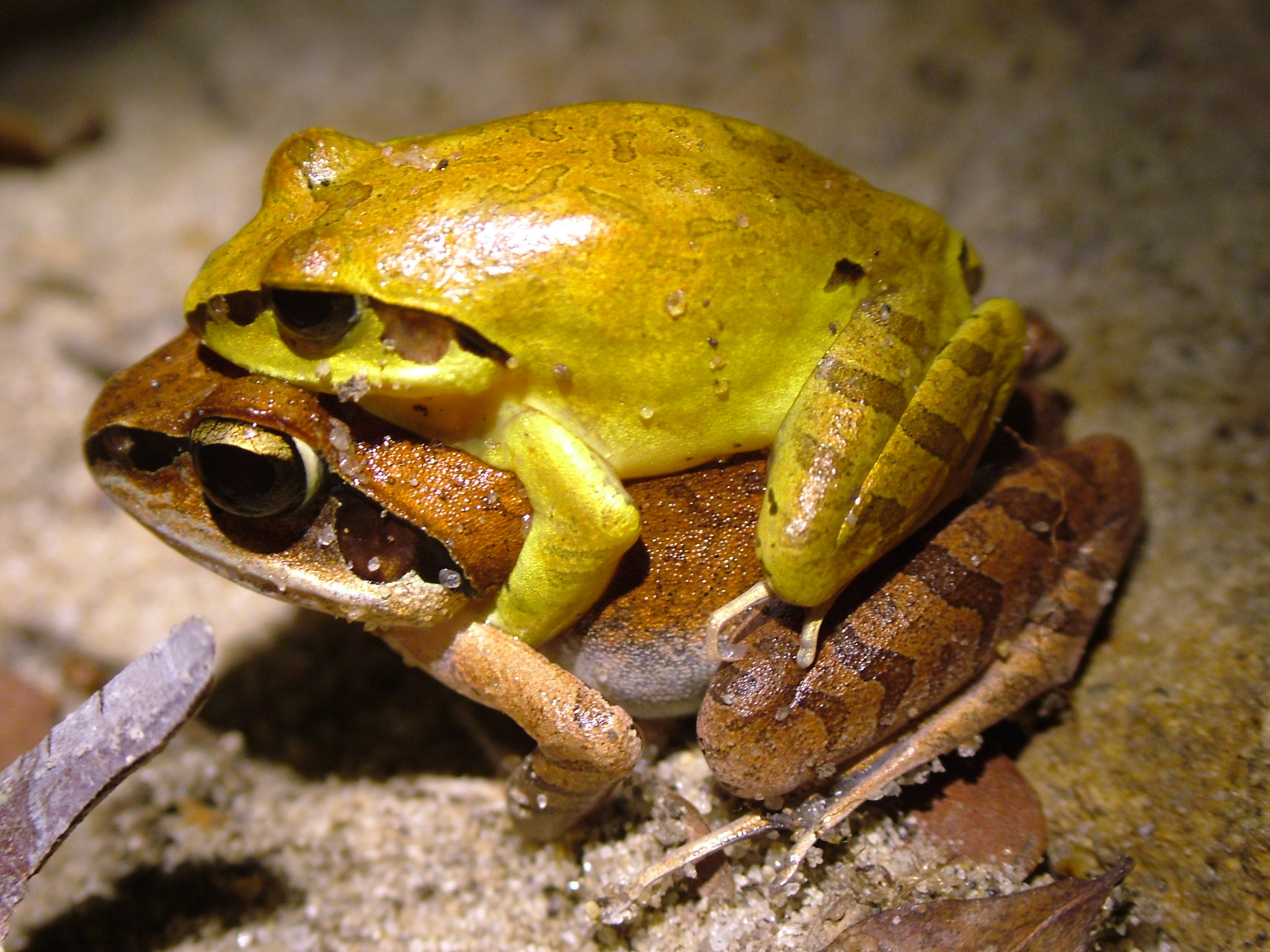

Conservation status
- Vulnerable (IUCN 3.1)

Scientific classification
- Kingdom: Animalia
- Phylum: Chordata
- Class: Amphibia
- Order: Anura
- Family: Mantellidae
- Genus: Aglyptodactylus
- Species: A. laticeps

Binomial name
- Aglyptodactylus laticeps Glaw, Vences, Böhme, 1998

= Aglyptodactylus laticeps =

Species of frog

Aglyptodactylus laticeps is a species of frog in the family Mantellidae. It is endemic to Madagascar. Its natural habitats are subtropical or tropical dry forests and intermittent freshwater marshes. It is threatened by habitat loss.
