= Gephyromantis schilfi =

Conservation status
- Vulnerable (IUCN 3.1)

Scientific classification
- Kingdom: Animalia
- Phylum: Chordata
- Class: Amphibia
- Order: Anura
- Family: Mantellidae
- Genus: Gephyromantis
- Subgenus: Gephyromantis (Duboimantis)
- Species: G. schilfi

Binomial name
- Gephyromantis schilfi Glaw & Vences, 2000

Species of amphibian

Gephyromantis schilfi, commonly known as Schilf's Madagascar frog, is a species of frog in the family Mantellidae. It is endemic to Madagascar thus donning the nickname "Madagascar frog". Its natural habitats are subtropical or tropical moist montane forests and heavily degraded former forest. It is threatened by habitat loss and is listed as vulnerable by the IUCN.

== Authority ==
- Glaw, F. & Vences, M. 2004.
