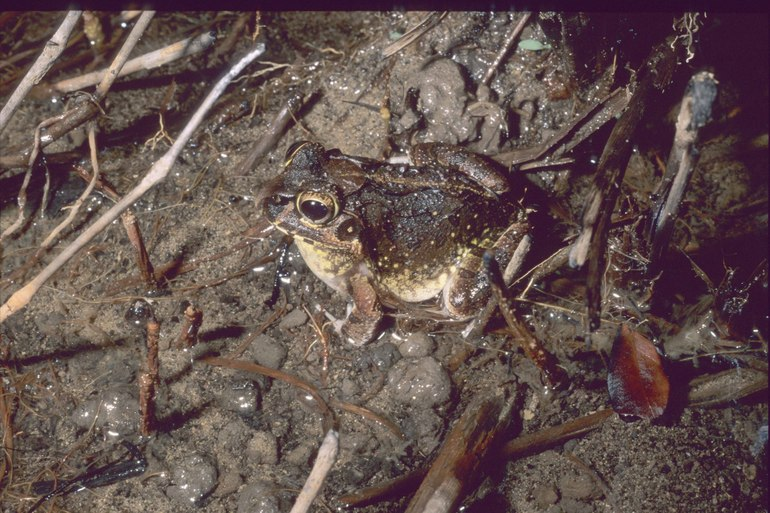
- Laliostoma labrosum

Scientific classification
- Domain: Eukaryota
- Kingdom: Animalia
- Phylum: Chordata
- Class: Amphibia
- Order: Anura
- Family: Mantellidae
- Subfamily: Laliostominae; Vences and Glaw, 2001

Genera
- 2 (see text)

= Laliostominae =

Subfamily of amphibians

Laliostominae is a subfamily of frogs in the family Mantellidae. It contains two genera and a total of seven species. These frogs are native to Madagascar.

== Genera ==
There are two recognized genera:

- Aglyptodactylus Boulenger, 1919 (6 species)
- Laliostoma Glaw, Vences & Böhme, 1998 (monotypic)
