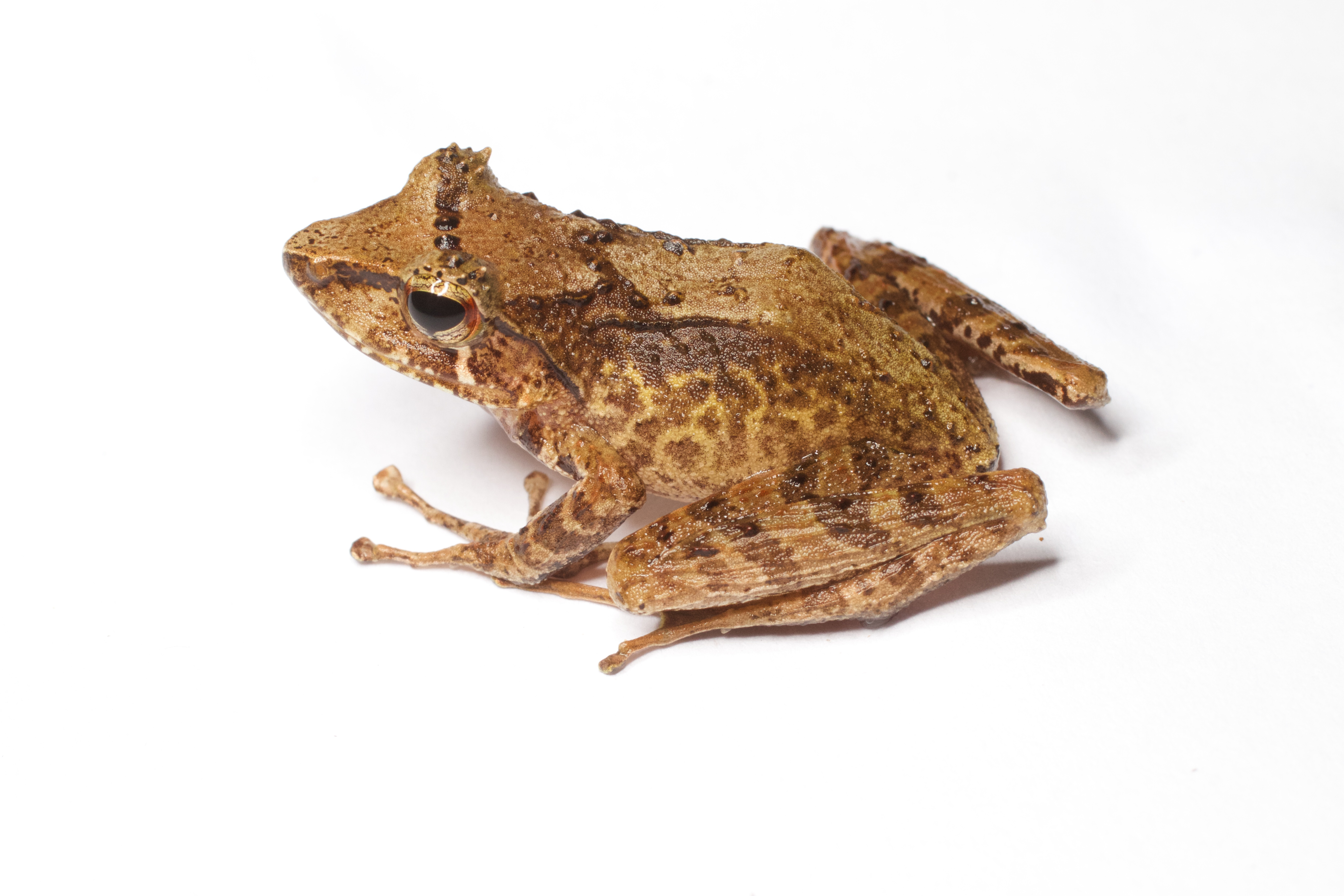

Conservation status
- Least Concern (IUCN 3.1)

Scientific classification
- Kingdom: Animalia
- Phylum: Chordata
- Class: Amphibia
- Order: Anura
- Family: Mantellidae
- Genus: Gephyromantis
- Subgenus: Gephyromantis (Duboimantis)
- Species: G. tschenki

Binomial name
- Gephyromantis tschenki (Glaw & Vences, 2001)

Synonyms
- Mantidactylus (Phylacomantis) tschenki Glaw and Vences, 2001)

= Gephyromantis tschenki =

Species of amphibian

Gephyromantis tschenki, commonly known as Tschenk's Madagascar frog, is a species of frogs in the family Mantellidae. It is endemic to Madagascar. Its natural habitats are subtropical or tropical moist lowland forests, subtropical or tropical moist montane forests, and rivers. It is threatened by habitat loss.
