= Gephyromantis thelenae =

Conservation status
- Endangered (IUCN 3.1)

Scientific classification
- Kingdom: Animalia
- Phylum: Chordata
- Class: Amphibia
- Order: Anura
- Family: Mantellidae
- Genus: Gephyromantis
- Subgenus: Gephyromantis (Gephyromantis)
- Species: G. thelenae

Binomial name
- Gephyromantis thelenae Glaw & Vences, 1994

Species of amphibian

Gephyromantis thelenae, commonly known as the Thelen Madagascar frog, is a species of frog in the family Mantellidae. It is endemic to Madagascar. Its natural habitats are subtropical or tropical moist lowland forests and plantations. It is threatened by habitat loss.
