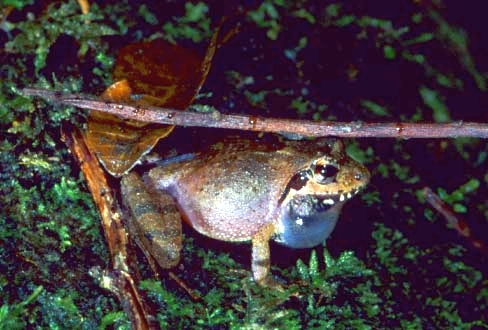

Conservation status
- Near Threatened (IUCN 3.1)

Scientific classification
- Kingdom: Animalia
- Phylum: Chordata
- Class: Amphibia
- Order: Anura
- Family: Mantellidae
- Genus: Gephyromantis
- Subgenus: Gephyromantis (Gephyromantis)
- Species: G. leucocephalus

Binomial name
- Gephyromantis leucocephalus Angel, 1930

Synonyms
- Gephyromantis decaryi leucocephala Angel, 1930; Mantidactylus leucocephalus (Angel, 1930)

= Gephyromantis leucocephalus =

Species of amphibian

Gephyromantis leucocephalus is a species of frog in the family Mantellidae. It is endemic to southeastern Madagascar and found from Midongy-du-Sud south to Tôlanaro. It lives in a range of habitats with some tree cover, including rainforest, degraded habitats, and eucalyptus plantations, at elevations between 0 and 900 m (3,000 ft) above sea level. It is a very abundant species, but it is threatened by the loss and degradation of its forest habitat. It is found in the Andohahela and Midongy du sud National Parks.
