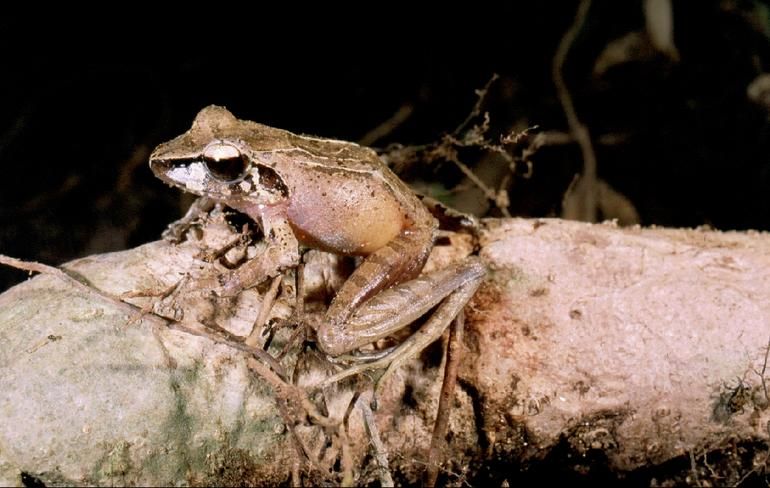

Conservation status
- Vulnerable (IUCN 3.1)

Scientific classification
- Kingdom: Animalia
- Phylum: Chordata
- Class: Amphibia
- Order: Anura
- Family: Mantellidae
- Genus: Gephyromantis
- Subgenus: Gephyromantis (Duboimantis)
- Species: G. salegy

Binomial name
- Gephyromantis salegy Andreone, Aprea, Vences & Odierna, 2003

= Gephyromantis salegy =

Species of amphibian

Gephyromantis salegy, commonly known as the Abolokopatrika Madagascar frog, is a species of frog in the family Mantellidae. It is endemic to Madagascar. Its natural habitats are subtropical or tropical moist lowland forests and subtropical or tropical moist montane forests. It is threatened by habitat loss.
