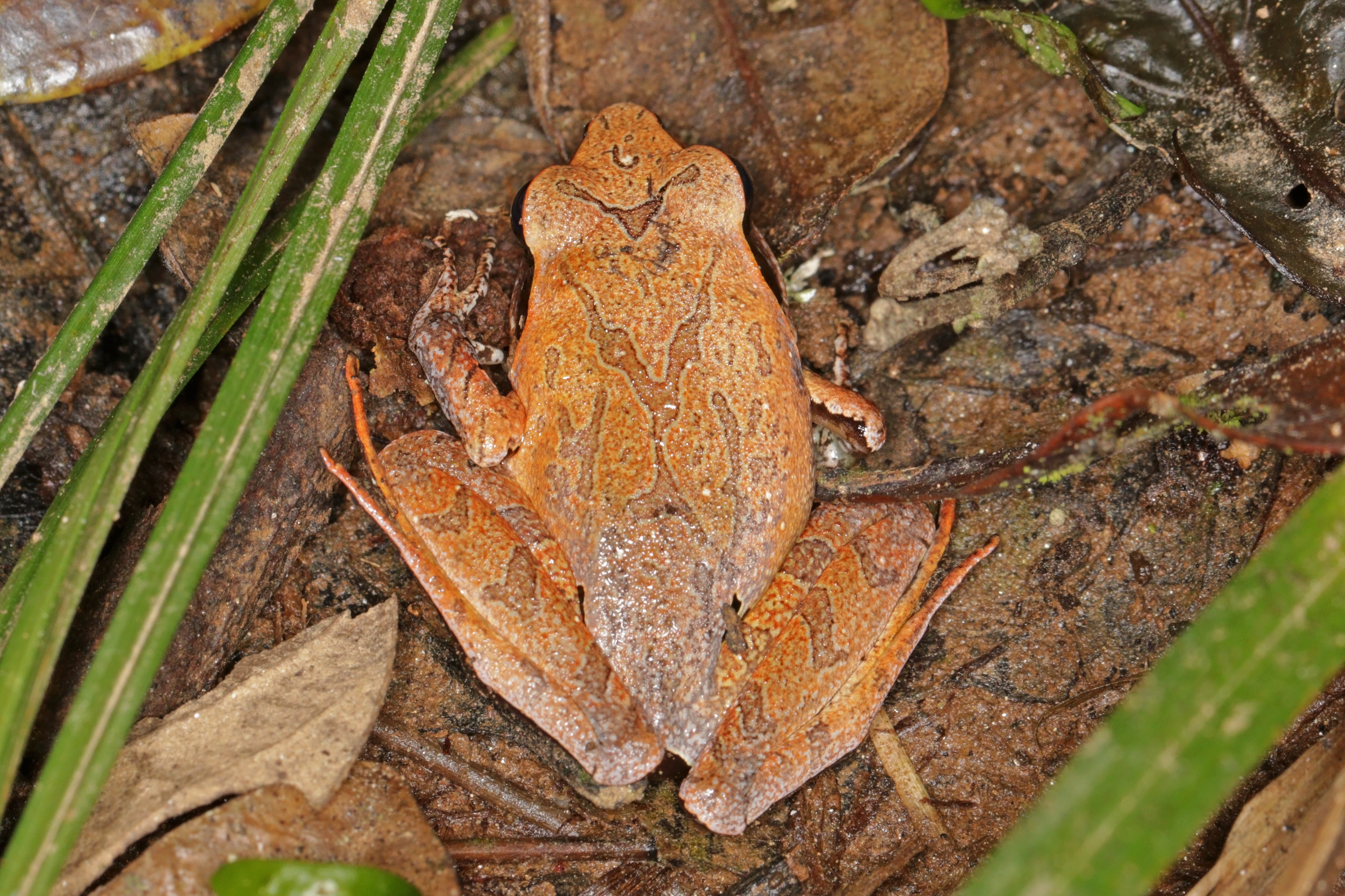

Conservation status
- Endangered (IUCN 3.1)

Scientific classification
- Kingdom: Animalia
- Phylum: Chordata
- Class: Amphibia
- Order: Anura
- Family: Mantellidae
- Genus: Aglyptodactylus
- Species: A. australis

Binomial name
- Aglyptodactylus australis Köhler, Glaw, Pabijan, and Vences, 2015

= Aglyptodactylus australis =

Species of frog

Aglyptodactylus australis is a species of frog in the family Mantellidae. It is endemic to Madagascar.

This species was first described in 2015 and is considered endangered.

== Habitat and range ==
Aglyptodactylus australis has been observed in the plant litter of primary rainforests and bamboo forests.

The species has been observed only in southeastern Madagascar, around Andohahela National Park.
