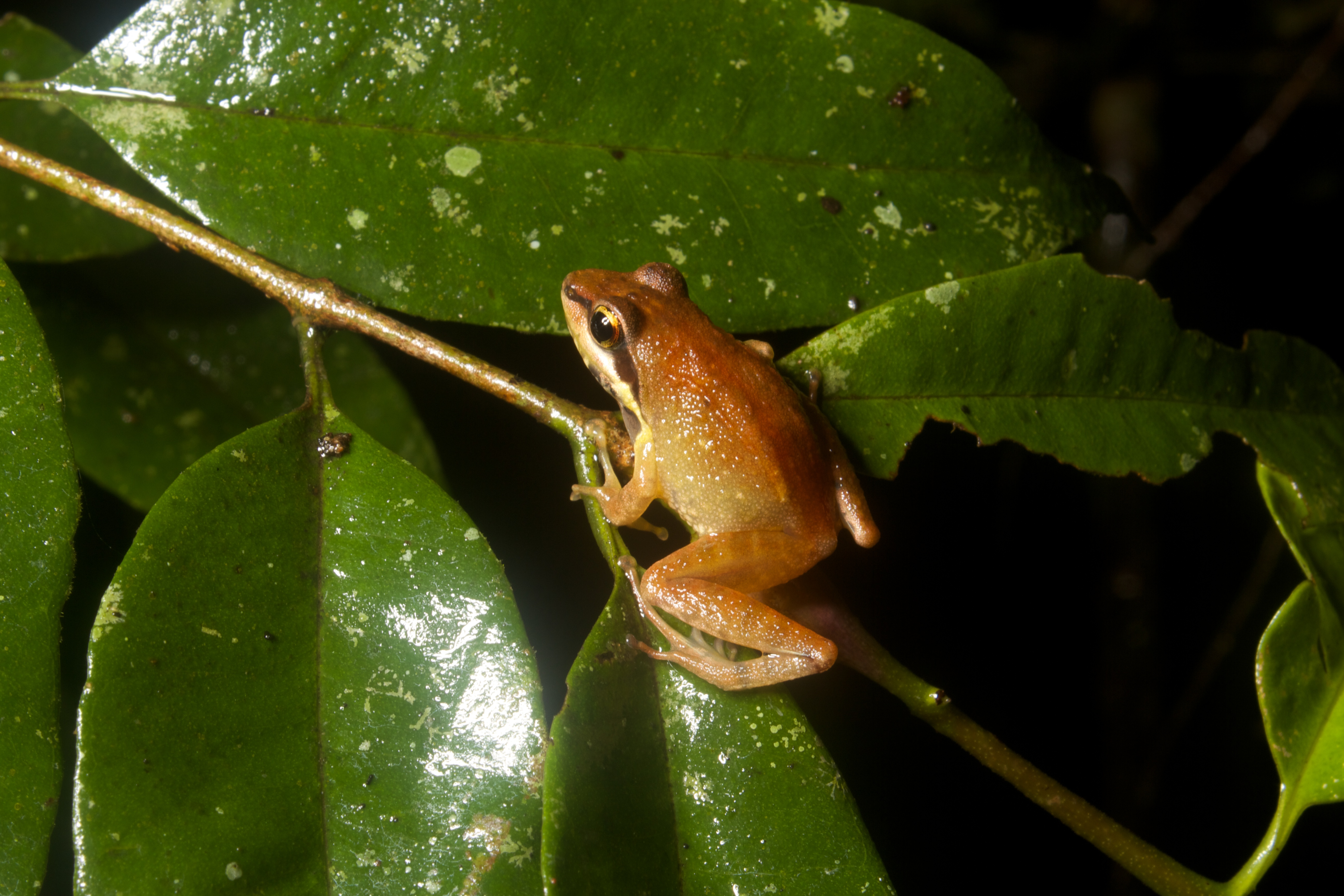

Conservation status
- Vulnerable (IUCN 3.1)

Scientific classification
- Kingdom: Animalia
- Phylum: Chordata
- Class: Amphibia
- Order: Anura
- Family: Mantellidae
- Genus: Gephyromantis
- Subgenus: Gephyromantis (Gephyromantis)
- Species: G. enki

Binomial name
- Gephyromantis enki Glaw & Vences, 2002

= Gephyromantis enki =

Species of amphibian

Gephyromantis enki, commonly known as the Ambatolahy Madagascar frog, is a species of frog in the family Mantellidae. It is endemic to Madagascar. Its natural habitats are subtropical or tropical moist lowland forests, subtropical or tropical moist montane forests, and heavily degraded former forest. They are known for their light greenish yellow skin.
