= Gephyromantis verrucosus =

Conservation status
- Least Concern (IUCN 3.1)

Scientific classification
- Kingdom: Animalia
- Phylum: Chordata
- Class: Amphibia
- Order: Anura
- Family: Mantellidae
- Genus: Gephyromantis
- Species: G. verrucosus

Binomial name
- Gephyromantis verrucosus Angel, 1930

Species of amphibian

Gephyromantis verrucosus is a species of mantellid frog endemic to Madagascar. Its natural habitats are rainforests but it can also be found in degraded forests and in invasive eucalyptus forests within the rainforest belt at elevations up to 1,200 m (3,900 ft) above sea level. It is a common frog, although it is suspected to be in decline because of habitat loss and deterioration. Once thought to be synonymous with G.boulengeri, this taxon was resurrected as a distinct species due to genetic and morphological differences.
