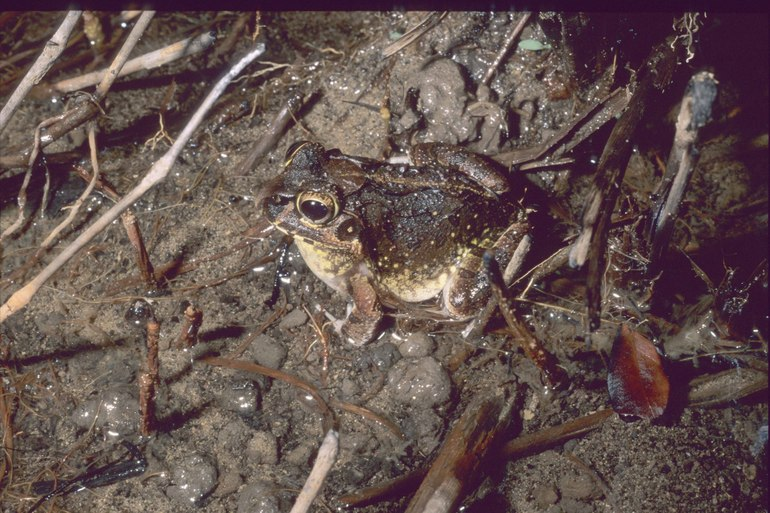

Conservation status
- Least Concern (IUCN 3.1)

Scientific classification
- Kingdom: Animalia
- Phylum: Chordata
- Class: Amphibia
- Order: Anura
- Family: Mantellidae
- Genus: Laliostoma; Glaw, Vences & Böhme, 1998
- Species: L. labrosum

Binomial name
- Laliostoma labrosum (Cope, 1868)

= Laliostoma =

Genus of amphibians

Laliostoma is a genus of frogs in the family Mantellidae. It is monotypic, being represented by a single species, Laliostoma labrosum, or the Madagascar Bullfrog. It is endemic to Madagascar. Its natural habitats are subtropical or tropical moist lowland forests, dry savanna, moist savanna, subtropical or tropical dry shrubland, subtropical or tropical dry lowland grassland, intermittent freshwater marshes, hot deserts, arable land, pastureland, rural gardens, urban areas, ponds, seasonally flooded agricultural land, and canals and ditches.
