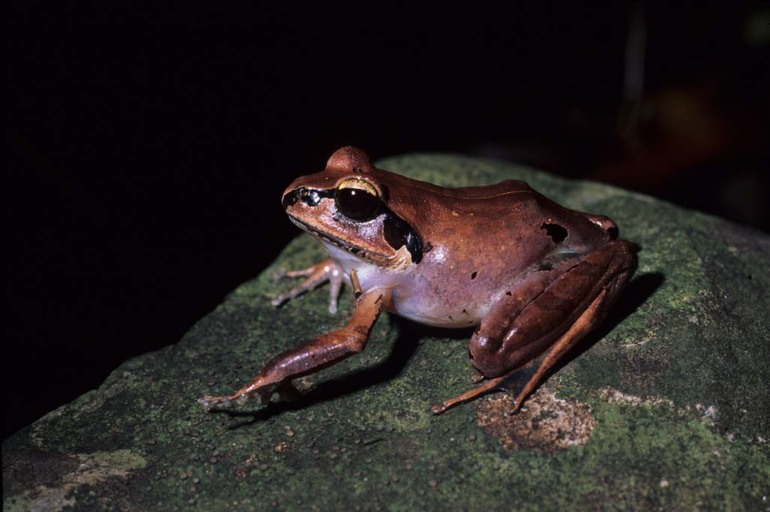
- Aglyptodactylus securifer

Scientific classification
- Domain: Eukaryota
- Kingdom: Animalia
- Phylum: Chordata
- Class: Amphibia
- Order: Anura
- Family: Mantellidae
- Subfamily: Laliostominae
- Genus: Aglyptodactylus; Boulenger, 1919

Type species
- Limnodytes madagascariensis Duméril, 1853

Diversity
- 6 species

= Aglyptodactylus =

Genus of amphibians

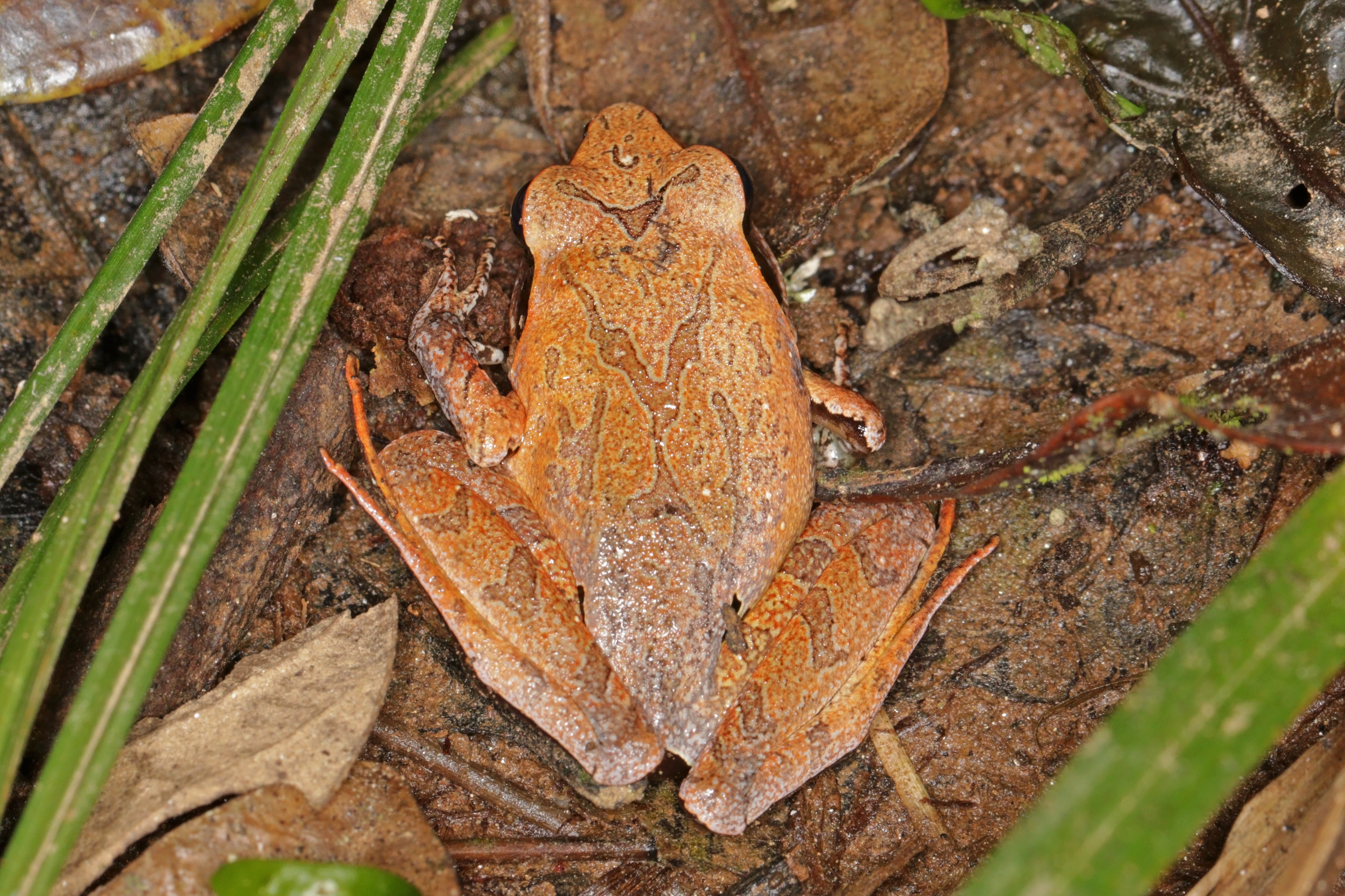
A. australis, Andasibe-Mantadia National Park

Aglyptodactylus is a genus of frogs in the family Mantellidae. These frogs, sometimes known as the Madagascar jumping frogs, are endemic to Madagascar. Systematic revisions of the groups were published in 1998 and 2015. Six species are currently recognized.

== Description ==
Aglyptodactylus are medium-sized frogs as adults, measuring 35–60 mm (1.4–2.4 in) in snout–vent length.

=== Tadpoles ===
All Aglyptodactylus species have small, morphologically similar tadpoles that metamorphose at a size of 7–15 mm (0.28–0.59 in). However, they differ in their habitat, ranging from ephemeral pools (Aglyptodactylus laticeps) to river bed pools (Aglyptodactylus securifer) to stagnant pools (Aglyptodactylus madagascariensis). The tadpoles are detritivorous.

== Species ==
There are six Aglyptodactylus species:

- Aglyptodactylus australis Köhler, Glaw, Pabijan & Vences, 2015
- Aglyptodactylus chorus Köhler, Glaw, Pabijan & Vences, 2015
- Aglyptodactylus inguinalis (Günther, 1877)
- Aglyptodactylus laticeps Glaw, Vences & Böhme, 1998
- Aglyptodactylus madagascariensis (Duméril, 1853)
- Aglyptodactylus securifer Glaw, Vences & Böhme, 1998
