= Gephyromantis asper =

Conservation status
- Least Concern (IUCN 3.1)

Scientific classification
- Kingdom: Animalia
- Phylum: Chordata
- Class: Amphibia
- Order: Anura
- Family: Mantellidae
- Genus: Gephyromantis
- Subgenus: Gephyromantis (Asperomantis)
- Species: G. asper

Binomial name
- Gephyromantis asper (Boulenger, 1882)

Species of amphibian

Gephyromantis asper, commonly known as the East Betsileo Madagascar frog is a species of frog in the family Mantellidae. It is endemic to Madagascar. Its natural habitats are subtropical or tropical moist lowland forests and subtropical or tropical moist montane forests. It is threatened by habitat loss.
