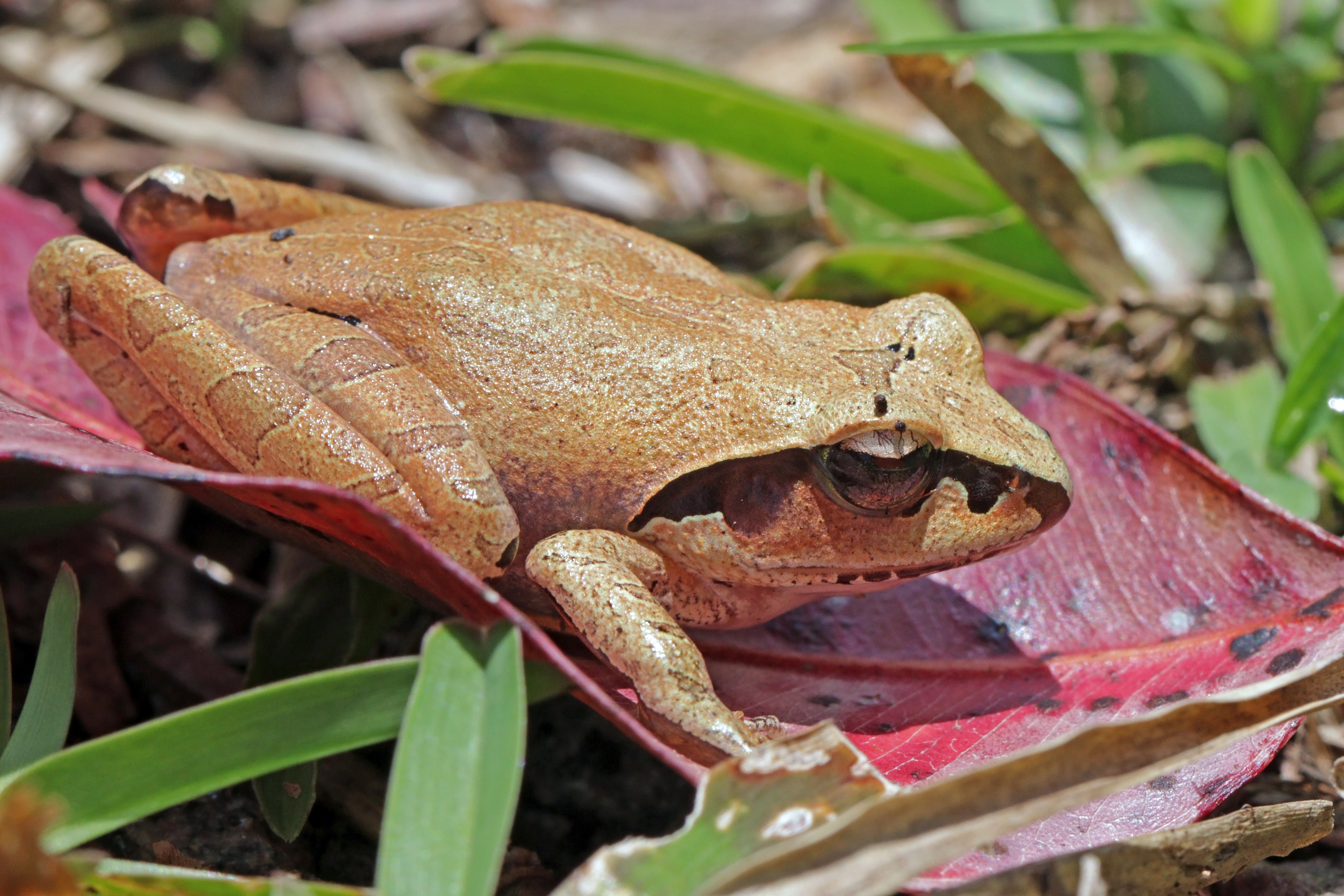
- In Ranomafana National Park

Conservation status
- Least Concern (IUCN 3.1)

Scientific classification
- Kingdom: Animalia
- Phylum: Chordata
- Class: Amphibia
- Order: Anura
- Family: Mantellidae
- Genus: Aglyptodactylus
- Species: A. madagascariensis

Binomial name
- Aglyptodactylus madagascariensis (Duméril, 1853)
- Approximate distribution (Madagascar) Range

= Aglyptodactylus madagascariensis =

Species of frog

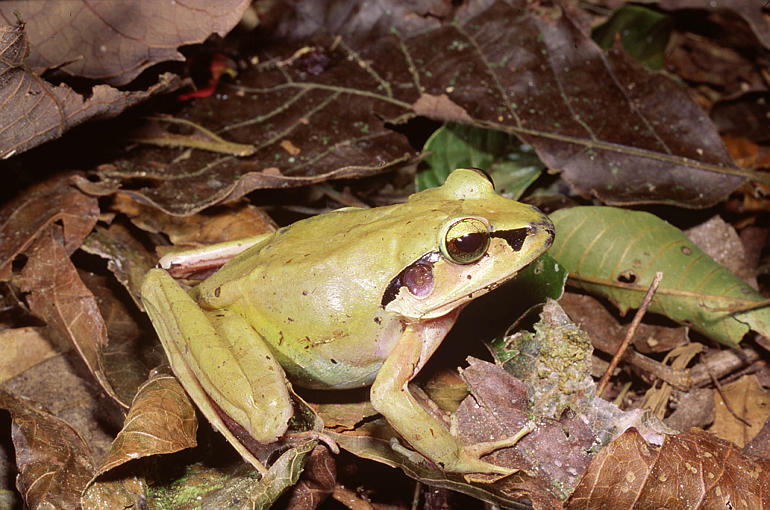
Unknown location

Aglyptodactylus madagascariensis is a species of frog in the family Mantellidae known commonly as the Madagascar jumping frog. It is endemic to Madagascar, where it has a wide distribution across the eastern side of the island. A. madagascariensis is a complex of various species which occur in different elevational ranges and different areas of Eastern Madagascar.

This frog is common and forms large groups during its mating season, when it breeds "explosively". It lives in the leaf litter of tropical forest habitat, and it can utilize disturbed habitat and plantations.
