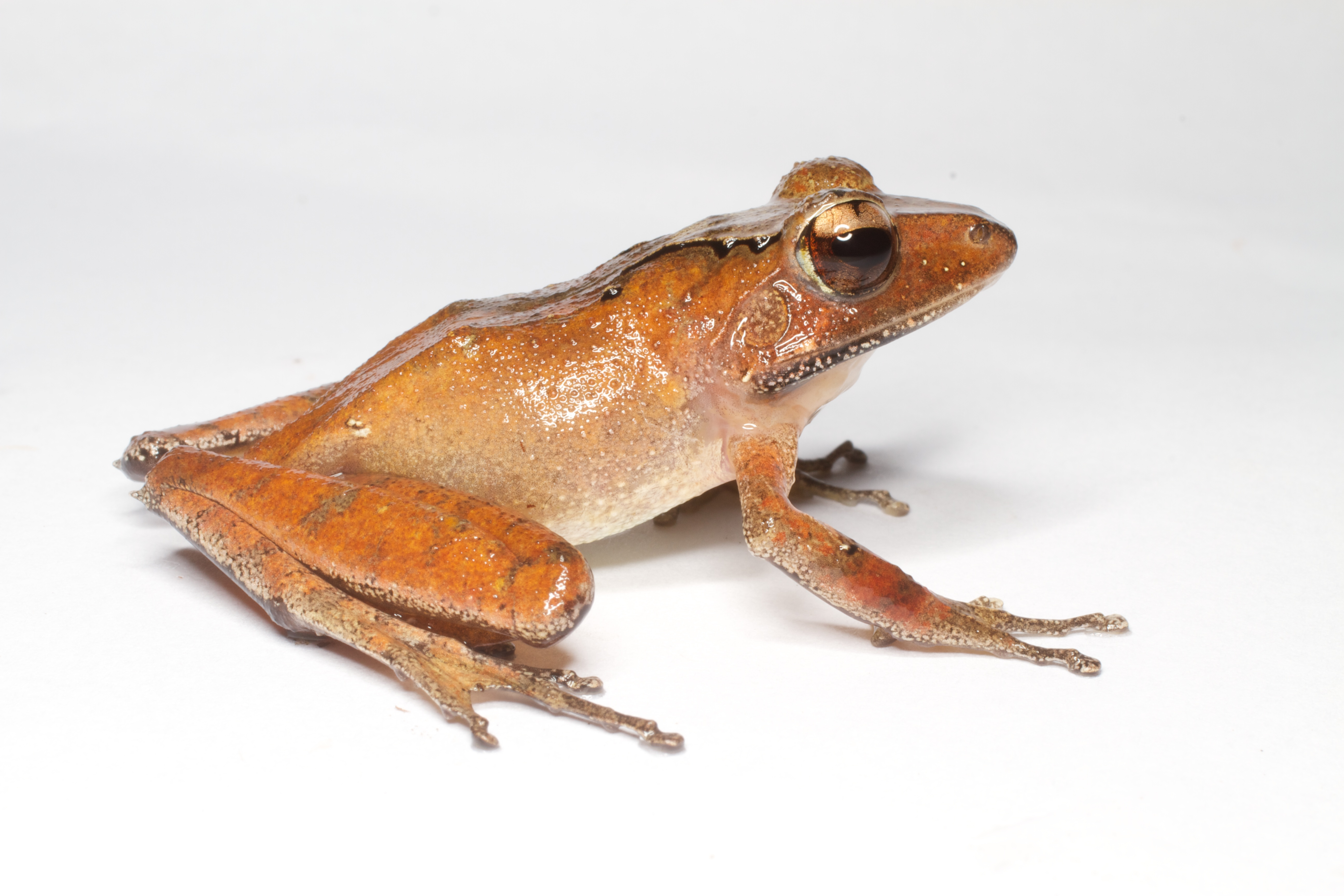

Conservation status
- Least Concern (IUCN 3.1)

Scientific classification
- Kingdom: Animalia
- Phylum: Chordata
- Class: Amphibia
- Order: Anura
- Family: Mantellidae
- Genus: Gephyromantis
- Subgenus: Gephyromantis (Duboimantis)
- Species: G. plicifer

Binomial name
- Gephyromantis plicifer (Boulenger, 1882)

= Gephyromantis plicifer =

Common Madagascar frog

Species of amphibian

Gephyromantis plicifer, commonly known as the common Madagascar frog, is a species of frog in the family Mantellidae. It is endemic to Madagascar. Its natural habitat is subtropical or tropical moist lowland forests. It is threatened by habitat loss.
