= Vences's chameleon =

Vences' chameleon

Conservation status
- Endangered (IUCN 3.1)

Scientific classification
- Kingdom: Animalia
- Phylum: Chordata
- Class: Reptilia
- Order: Squamata
- Suborder: Iguania
- Family: Chamaeleonidae
- Genus: Calumma
- Species: C. vencesi

Binomial name
- Calumma vencesi Andreone, Mattioli, Jesu & Randrianirina, 2001
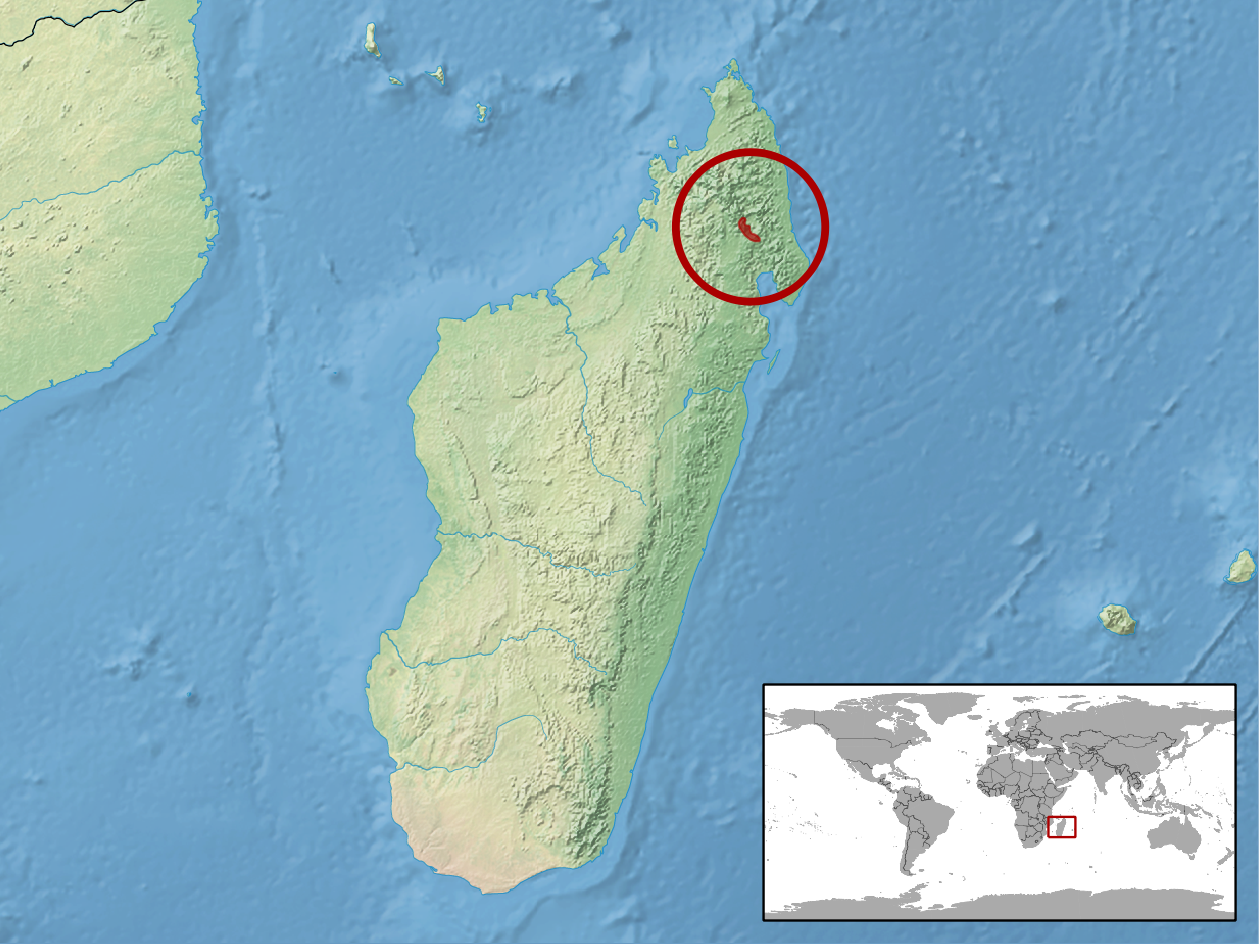
- Range of Vences's chameleon

Species of lizard

Vences's chameleon (Calumma vencesi) is a species of lizard in the family Chamaeleonidae. The species is endemic to Madagascar.

== Etymology ==
The specific name, vencesi, is in honor of German herpetologist Miguel Vences.

== Geographic range and habitat ==
The geographic range of Vences' chameleon is not well understood; it is thought that the total area is around 591 square kilometers (228 square miles). What is certain is that specimens have been collected from several forests in the northeastern corner of Madagascar. The species mostly inhabits the understories of humid forests in the lowlands, at altitudes of 600–1,000 m (2,000–3,300 ft).

== Reproduction ==
C. vencesi is oviparous.

== Conservation and threats ==
The main threat to Vences' chameleon is habitat loss and degradation. While having a sizable range, the species is extremely intolerant of damaged habitat. Also, it has not been recorded in any protected areas, making it all the more vulnerable to logging and slash and burn agriculture. Fortunately, the illegal trade of this species seems to be virtually nonexistent.
