= Enki (disambiguation) =

Enki is a god in Sumerian mythology.

Enki may also refer to:

- Enki Bilal (born 1951), comic book creator
- Enki Catena, crater chain on Ganymede
- Mantidactylus enki, species of frog
- Enki, a 2015 album by Melechesh
