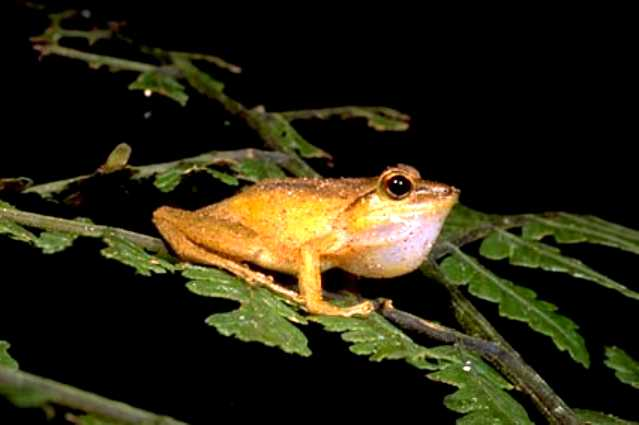

Conservation status
- Least Concern (IUCN 3.1)

Scientific classification
- Kingdom: Animalia
- Phylum: Chordata
- Class: Amphibia
- Order: Anura
- Family: Mantellidae
- Genus: Gephyromantis
- Subgenus: Gephyromantis (Duboimantis)
- Species: G. redimitus

Binomial name
- Gephyromantis redimitus (Boulenger, 1889)

= Gephyromantis redimitus =

Species of amphibian

Gephyromantis redimitus, commonly known as the banded Madagascar frog, is a species of frog in the family Mantellidae. It is endemic to Madagascar. Its natural habitat is subtropical or tropical moist lowland forests. It is threatened by habitat loss.
