= Gephyromantis eiselti =

Conservation status
- Endangered (IUCN 3.1)

Scientific classification
- Kingdom: Animalia
- Phylum: Chordata
- Class: Amphibia
- Order: Anura
- Family: Mantellidae
- Genus: Gephyromantis
- Subgenus: Gephyromantis (Gephyromantis)
- Species: G. eiselti

Binomial name
- Gephyromantis eiselti (Guibé, 1975)

Species of amphibian

Gephyromantis eiselti, commonly known as Eiselt's Madagascar frog, is a species of frog in the family Mantellidae. It is endemic to Madagascar. Its natural habitats are subtropical or tropical moist lowland forests, subtropical or tropical moist montane forests, and heavily degraded former forest.
