= Gephyromantis ampondo =

Scientific classification
- Kingdom: Animalia
- Phylum: Chordata
- Class: Amphibia
- Order: Anura
- Family: Mantellidae
- Genus: Gephyromantis
- Species: G. ampondo

Binomial name
- Gephyromantis ampondo Vences, et al., 2024

Species of amphibian

Gephyromantis ampondo is a species of forest-dwelling mantellid frog that is endemic to Madagascar. Its natural habitats are subtropical or tropical moist lowland forests and rivers.

== Description ==
Specimens of this species collected in Marojejy had appearances which help to differentiate it from other species, such as its stout head, interocular tubercles, shorter spine-like supraocular tubercles, and a concave canthus rostralis and loreal region.
