= Gephyromantis horridus =

Conservation status
- Vulnerable (IUCN 3.1)

Scientific classification
- Kingdom: Animalia
- Phylum: Chordata
- Class: Amphibia
- Order: Anura
- Family: Mantellidae
- Genus: Gephyromantis
- Subgenus: Gephyromantis (Laurentomantis)
- Species: G. horridus

Binomial name
- Gephyromantis horridus (Boettger, 1880)

Species of amphibian

Gephyromantis horridus, commonly known as Boettger's grainy frog, is a species of frog in the family Mantellidae. It is endemic to Madagascar. Its natural habitats are subtropical or tropical moist lowland forests and subtropical or tropical moist montane forests. It is threatened by habitat loss.
