= Gephyromantis blanci =

Conservation status
- Near Threatened (IUCN 3.1)

Scientific classification
- Kingdom: Animalia
- Phylum: Chordata
- Class: Amphibia
- Order: Anura
- Family: Mantellidae
- Genus: Gephyromantis
- Subgenus: Gephyromantis (Gephyromantis)
- Species: G. blanci

Binomial name
- Gephyromantis blanci Guibé, 1974

Synonyms
- Mantidactylus blanci (Guibé, 1974)

Species of amphibian

Gephyromantis blanci, commonly known as the white Madagascar frog, is a species of frog in the family Mantellidae. It is endemic to Madagascar and is found in the southeast of the island. Its natural habitat rainforest leaf litter; it tolerates some habitat degradation. It is not dependent on water and is presumed to reproduce through direct development (i.e., without free-living tadpole stage). It is threatened by habitat loss. It occurs in Ranomafana, Midongy du sud, and Andringitra National Parks.
