= Gephyromantis marokoroko =

Conservation status
- Endangered (IUCN 3.1)

Scientific classification
- Kingdom: Animalia
- Phylum: Chordata
- Class: Amphibia
- Order: Anura
- Family: Mantellidae
- Genus: Gephyromantis
- Species: G. marokoroko

Binomial name
- Gephyromantis marokoroko Carl R. Hutter et. al

Species of frog

Gephyromantis marokoroko is a species of frog endemic to the high-elevation rainforest Madagascar. The frog's specific name "marokoroko" means "rugged" in Malagasy, and it is named this for its distinctive warty skin.

The frog is endangered due to habitat loss in forest patches which are threatened by slash-and-burn agriculture, though it is also known to inhabit protected areas in both Andasibe-Mantadia National Park and Vohimana Special Reserve.

== Description ==
The frog has a rugose and granular dark brown skin with bright red mottling, and sparse light orange to white spots along its center. It has vibrant red eyes and femoral glands present only in males.
