= Gephyromantis spiniferus =

Conservation status
- Vulnerable (IUCN 3.1)

Scientific classification
- Kingdom: Animalia
- Phylum: Chordata
- Class: Amphibia
- Order: Anura
- Family: Mantellidae
- Genus: Gephyromantis
- Subgenus: Gephyromantis (Asperomantis)
- Species: G. spiniferus

Binomial name
- Gephyromantis spiniferus (Blommers-Schlösser and Blanc, 1991)

Synonyms
- Mantidactylus spiniferus Blommers-Schlösser and Blanc, 1991

Species of amphibian

Gephyromantis spiniferus is a species of frog in the family Mantellidae. It is endemic to southeastern Madagascar between Andringitra and Andohahela. Common name greater spiny Madagascar frog has been coined for it.

Gephyromantis spiniferus occurs in pristine rainforests at elevations of 600–1,000 m (2,000–3,300 ft) above sea level, particularly in association with bamboo. It lives on the forest floor. Presumably, breeding involves direct development (i.e., no free-living larval stage).

It is a rare species with a patchy distribution. It is threatened by habitat loss and degradation caused by subsistence agriculture, timber extraction, charcoal manufacture, invasive spread of eucalyptus, livestock grazing, and expanding human settlements. The fungus Batrachochytrium dendrobatidis has been detected in Gephyromantis species, but there is so far no evidence of negative effects. This species is present in the Kalambatritra Special Reserve, Andohahela National Park, and Andringitra National Park.
