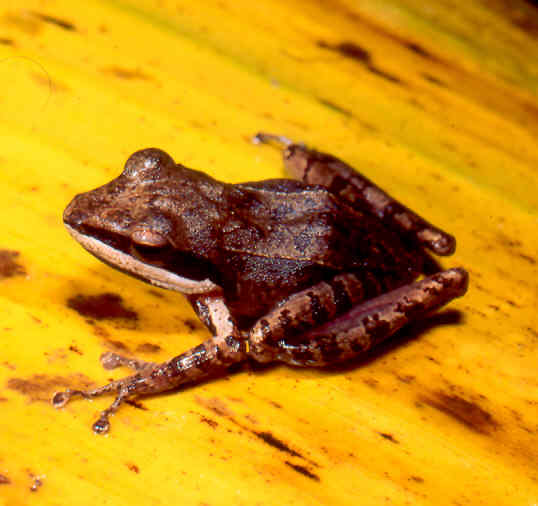

Conservation status
- Least Concern (IUCN 3.1)

Scientific classification
- Kingdom: Animalia
- Phylum: Chordata
- Class: Amphibia
- Order: Anura
- Family: Mantellidae
- Genus: Gephyromantis
- Subgenus: Gephyromantis (Duboimantis)
- Species: G. granulatus

Binomial name
- Gephyromantis granulatus (Boettger, 1881)

= Gephyromantis granulatus =

Species of amphibian

Gephyromantis granulatus, commonly known as the grainy Madagascar frog, is a species of frog in the family Mantellidae. It is endemic to Madagascar. Its natural habitats are subtropical or tropical moist lowland forests, plantations, and heavily degraded former forest.
