= Gephyromantis malagasius =

Conservation status
- Least Concern (IUCN 3.1)

Scientific classification
- Kingdom: Animalia
- Phylum: Chordata
- Class: Amphibia
- Order: Anura
- Family: Mantellidae
- Genus: Gephyromantis
- Subgenus: Gephyromantis (Laurentomantis)
- Species: G. malagasius

Binomial name
- Gephyromantis malagasius (Methuen & Hewitt, 1913)

Species of amphibian

Gephyromantis malagasius, commonly known as the Malasay grainy frog, is a species of frog in the family Mantellidae. It is endemic to Madagascar. Its natural habitats are subtropical or tropical moist lowland forests and subtropical or tropical moist montane forests. It is threatened by habitat loss.
