= Gephyromantis klemmeri =

Klemmer's Madagascar frog

Conservation status
- Endangered (IUCN 3.1)

Scientific classification
- Kingdom: Animalia
- Phylum: Chordata
- Class: Amphibia
- Order: Anura
- Family: Mantellidae
- Genus: Gephyromantis
- Species: G. klemmeri

Binomial name
- Gephyromantis klemmeri (Guibé, 1974)

Species of amphibian

Gephyromantis klemmeri, commonly known as Klemmer's Madagascar frog, is a species of frog in the family Mantellidae. The species is endemic to Madagascar.

== Etymology ==
The specific name, klemmeri, is in honor of German herpetologist Konrad Klemmer.

== Habitat ==
The preferred natural habitats of G. klemmeri are subtropical or tropical moist lowland forest and subtropical or tropical high-altitude shrubland.

== Conservation status ==
G. klemmeri is threatened by habitat loss.
