= Gephyromantis runewsweeki =

Scientific classification
- Kingdom: Animalia
- Phylum: Chordata
- Class: Amphibia
- Order: Anura
- Family: Mantellidae
- Genus: Gephyromantis
- Species: G. runewsweeki

Binomial name
- Gephyromantis runewsweeki Vences, M. & I. De la Riva (2007)

Species of amphibian

Gephyronmantis runewsweeki is a species of diurnal mantellid frog that is endemic to a fragment of mid-altitude rainforest near Mahasoa, Madagascar. It has a light-brown dorsal coloration.

The frog emits a series of short and largely melodious notes lasting around 100 milliseconds and these calls reportedly heard high in the mountains of Ranomafana National Park.
