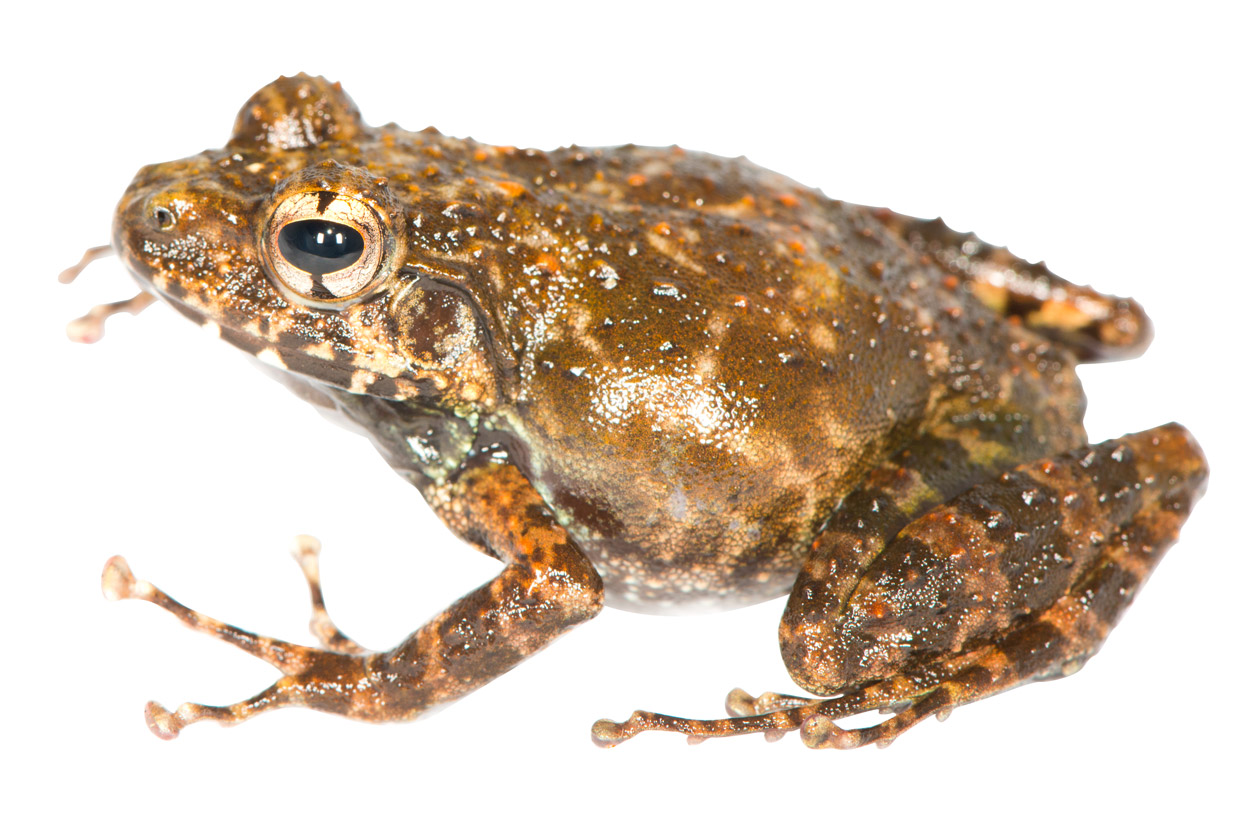

Conservation status
- Least Concern (IUCN 3.1)

Scientific classification
- Kingdom: Animalia
- Phylum: Chordata
- Class: Amphibia
- Order: Anura
- Family: Mantellidae
- Genus: Gephyromantis
- Subgenus: Gephyromantis (Phylacomantis)
- Species: G. pseudoasper

Binomial name
- Gephyromantis pseudoasper (Guibé, 1974)

Synonyms
- Mantidactylus glandulosus Methuen and Hewitt, 1913; Mantidactylus pseudoasper Guibé, 1974

= Gephyromantis pseudoasper =

Species of amphibian

Gephyromantis pseudoasper, also known as the Massif Madagascar frog, is a species of frog in the family Mantellidae. It is endemic to northern Madagascar. It occurs in both pristine and degraded rainforests and in secondary vegetation at elevations up to 900 m (3,000 ft) above sea level. It can be found both on the ground and in trees. Breeding takes place in streams.

== Advertisement call ==
The advertisement call of the species is an energetic, high-pitched series of notes, emitted often in the early hours of the morning.

The advertisement call of Gephyromantis pseudoasper in Montagne d'Ambre recorded on 2017-12-09 at 04h15, with other specimens calling in the background
