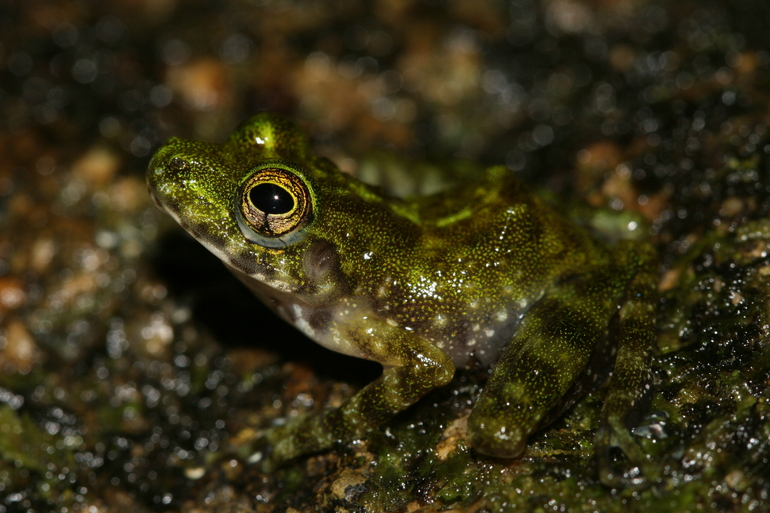

Conservation status
- Endangered (IUCN 3.1)

Scientific classification
- Kingdom: Animalia
- Phylum: Chordata
- Class: Amphibia
- Order: Anura
- Family: Mantellidae
- Genus: Gephyromantis
- Subgenus: Gephyromantis (Vatomantis)
- Species: G. webbi

Binomial name
- Gephyromantis webbi (Grandison, 1953)

= Gephyromantis webbi =

Species of amphibian

Gephyromantis webbi, commonly known as Webb's Madagascar frog, is a species of frog in the family Mantellidae. It is endemic to Madagascar. Its natural habitats are subtropical or tropical moist lowland forests and rivers. It is threatened by habitat loss.
