= Gephyromantis decaryi =

Conservation status
- Near Threatened (IUCN 3.1)

Scientific classification
- Kingdom: Animalia
- Phylum: Chordata
- Class: Amphibia
- Order: Anura
- Family: Mantellidae
- Genus: Gephyromantis
- Subgenus: Gephyromantis (Gephyromantis)
- Species: G. decaryi

Binomial name
- Gephyromantis decaryi Angel, 1930

Synonyms
- Mantidactylus decaryi (Angel, 1930)

Species of amphibian

Gephyromantis decaryi, commonly known as Decary's Madagascar frog, is a species of frog in the family Mantellidae. It is endemic to Madagascar. Its natural habitats are subtropical or tropical moist lowland forests, subtropical or tropical moist montane forests, and heavily degraded former forest. It is threatened by habitat loss.
