= Vohimana Special Reserve =

Private nature reserve in Madagaskar

Vohimana Special Reserve is a private nature reserve covering 2,200 hectares of land on the eastern edge of Madagascar. The reserve is vital to the survival of thousands of species. The reserve was founded in 2005 by the French-Madagascan non-governmental organization L'homme et l'environment, and administration was given to the municipal association Merci Vohimana in 2012.
