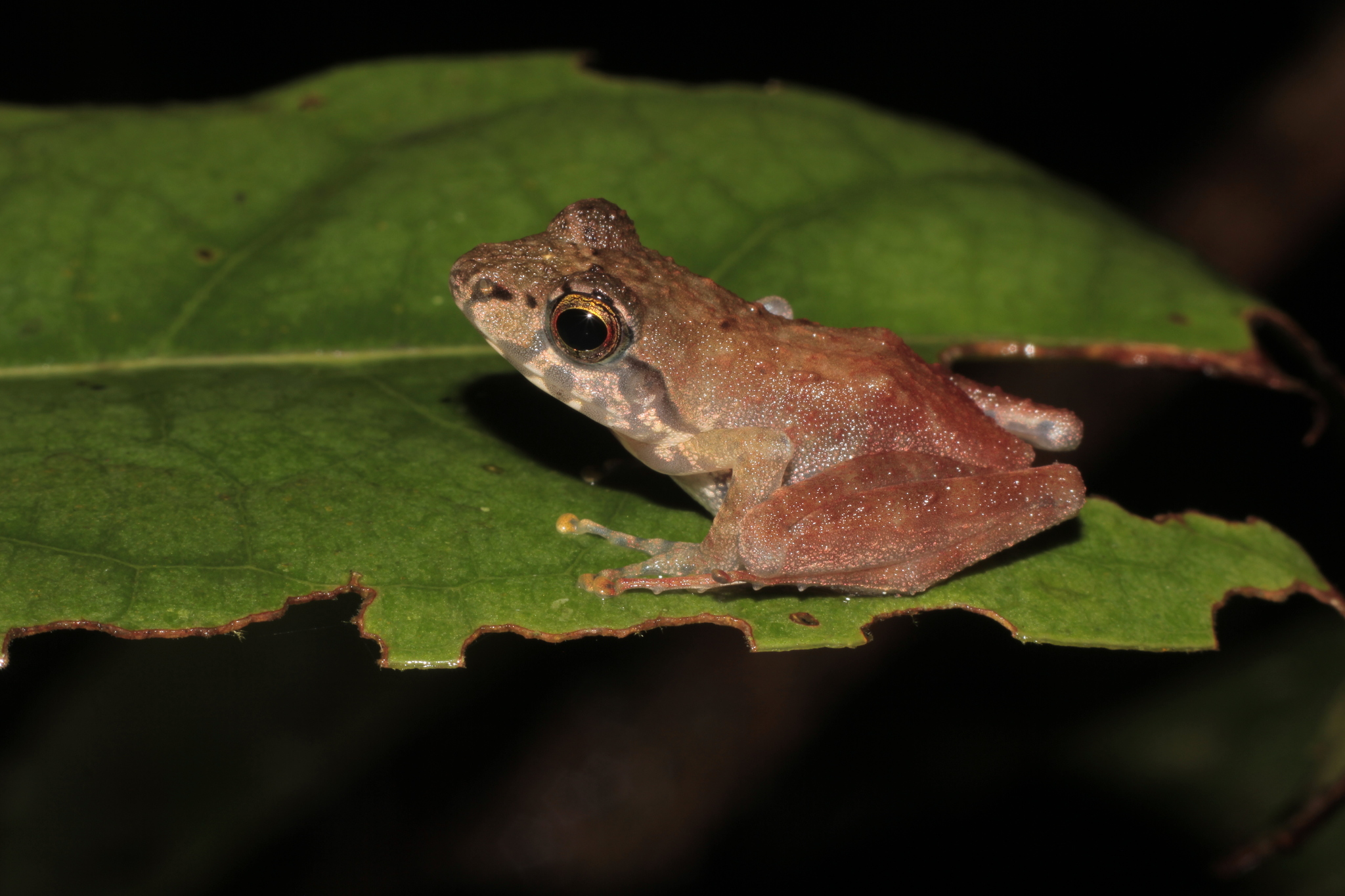

Conservation status
- Least Concern (IUCN 3.1)

Scientific classification
- Kingdom: Animalia
- Phylum: Chordata
- Class: Amphibia
- Order: Anura
- Family: Mantellidae
- Genus: Gephyromantis
- Subgenus: Gephyromantis (Gephyromantis)
- Species: G. boulengeri

Binomial name
- Gephyromantis boulengeri Methuen, 1920

Synonyms
- Rhacophorus gephyromantis Ahl, 1929 "1928" – nomen novum, preoccupied by Rhacophorus boulengeri Peracca, 1892; Mantidactylus boulengeri (Methuen, 1920)

= Gephyromantis boulengeri =

Species of amphibian

Gephyromantis boulengeri, sometimes known as Boulenger's Madagascar frog, is a species of frog in the family Mantellidae. It is endemic to Madagascar and found in the northeastern and eastern Madagascar as well as in Île Sainte-Marie. Its natural habitats are rainforests but it can also be found in degraded forests and in invasive eucalyptus forests within the rainforest belt at elevations up to 1,200 m (3,900 ft) above sea level. It is a common frog, although it is suspected to be in decline because of habitat loss and deterioration. However, it occurs in several protected areas.
