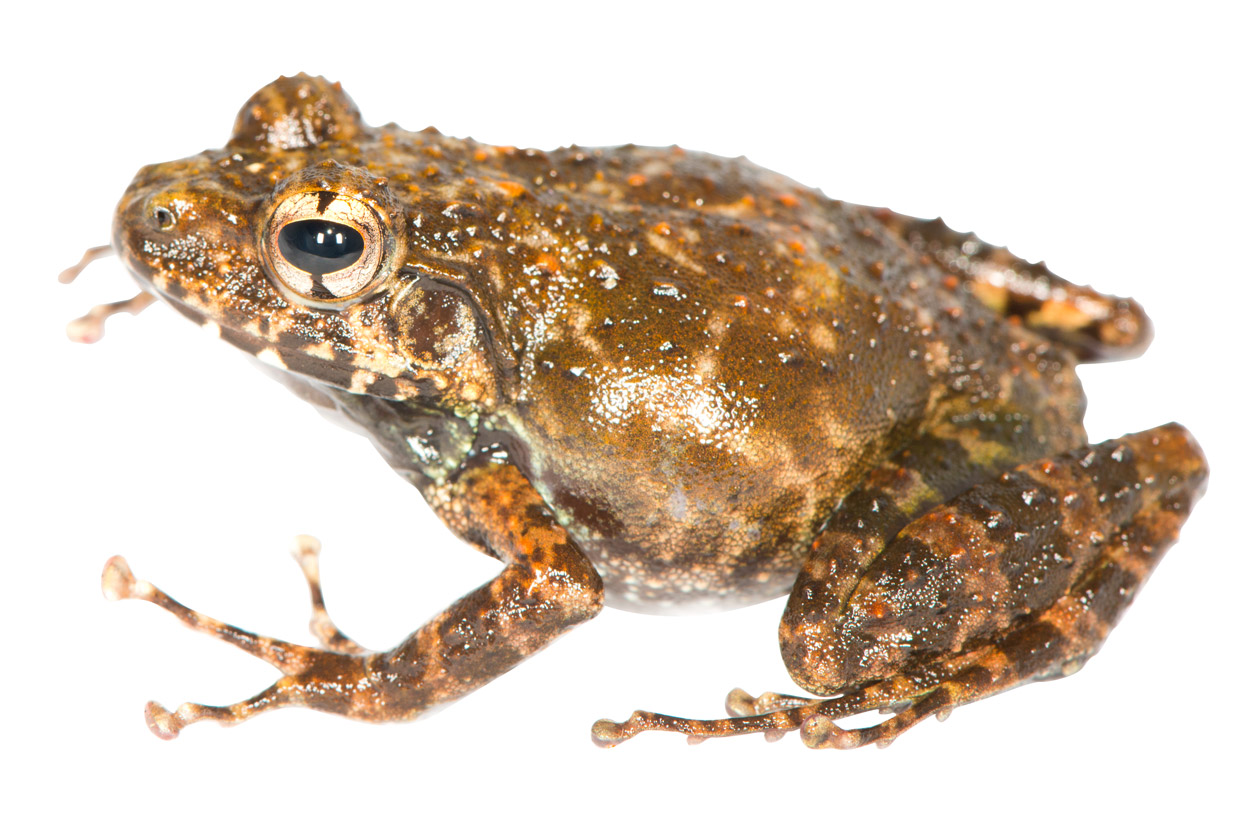
- Gephyromantis (Phylacomantis) pseudoasper

Scientific classification
- Kingdom: Animalia
- Phylum: Chordata
- Class: Amphibia
- Order: Anura
- Superfamily: Ranoidea
- Family: Mantellidae
- Subfamily: Mantellinae
- Genus: Gephyromantis; Methuen, 1920

Type species
- Gephyromantis boulengeri Methuen, 1920

Synonyms
- Microphryne Methuen and Hewitt, 1913; Trachymantis Methuen, 1920

= Gephyromantis =

Genus of amphibians

Gephyromantis is a genus of frogs in the mantellid subfamily Mantellinae. Species of the genus are endemic to Madagascar.

== Taxonomy ==
The genus Gephyromantis was erected by Methuen in 1920 for the species Gephyromantis boulengeri. Blommers-Schlösser considered this group as a subgenus of Mantidactylus, but it was re-elevated to genus-level in 2006. There are over 60 species recognised in the genus Gephyromantis.

== Species ==
The following species are recognised in the genus Gephyromantis:

- Gephyromantis ambohitra (Vences and Glaw, 2001)
- Gephyromantis ampondo Vences, et al., 2024
- Gephyromantis angano Scherz, et al., 2017
- Gephyromantis asper (Boulenger, 1882)
- Gephyromantis atsingy Crottini, et al., 2011
- Gephyromantis bemiray Vences, et al., 2024
- Gephyromantis blanci Guibé, 1973
- Gephyromantis boulengeri Methuen, 1920
- Gephyromantis ceratophrys (Ahl, 1929 "1928")
- Gephyromantis cornucopia Miralles, et al., 2023
- Gephyromantis cornutus (Glaw and Vences, 1992)
- Gephyromantis corvus (Glaw and Vences, 1994)
- Gephyromantis decaryi Angel, 1930
- Gephyromantis eiselti Guibé, 1975
- Gephyromantis enki (Glaw and Vences, 2002)
- Gephyromantis feomborona Miralles, et al., 2023
- Gephyromantis fiharimpe Vences, et al., 2022
- Gephyromantis fuscus Vences, et al., 2024
- Gephyromantis granulatus (Boettger, 1881)
- Gephyromantis grosjeani Scherz, et al., 2018
- Gephyromantis hintelmannae Wollenberg, Glaw, and Vences, 2012
- Gephyromantis horridus (Boettger, 1880)
- Gephyromantis kintana Cocca, et al., 2020
- Gephyromantis klemmeri Guibé, 1973
- Gephyromantis kremenae Miralles, et al., 2023
- Gephyromantis leucocephalus Angel, 1930
- Gephyromantis leucomaculatus (Guibé, 1975)
- Gephyromantis lomorina Scherz, et al., 2018
- Gephyromantis luteus (Methuen and Hewitt, 1913)
- Gephyromantis mafifeo Miralles, et al., 2023
- Gephyromantis mafy Vieites, Wollenberg, and Vences, 2012
- Gephyromantis makira Vences, et al., 2024
- Gephyromantis malagasius (Methuen and Hewitt, 1913)
- Gephyromantis marokoroko Hutter, et al., 2021
- Gephyromantis matsilo Vences, et al., 2022
- Gephyromantis mitsinjo Miralles, et al., 2023
- Gephyromantis moseri (Glaw and Vences, 2002)
- Gephyromantis oelkrugi Vences, et al., 2022
- Gephyromantis pedronoi Vences, et al., 2021
- Gephyromantis plicifer (Boulenger, 1882)
- Gephyromantis portonae Vences, et al., 2022
- Gephyromantis pseudoasper (Guibé, 1973)
- Gephyromantis ranjomavo Glaw and Vences, 2011
- Gephyromantis redimitus (Boulenger, 1889)
- Gephyromantis rivicola (Vences, Glaw, and Andreone, 1997)
- Gephyromantis runewsweeki Vences and De la Riva, 2007
- Gephyromantis salegy (Andreone, Aprea, Vences, and Odierna, 2003)
- Gephyromantis saturnini Scherz, et al., 2018
- Gephyromantis schilfi (Glaw and Vences, 2000)
- Gephyromantis sergei Miralles, et al., 2023
- Gephyromantis silvanus (Vences, Glaw, and Andreone, 1997)
- Gephyromantis spiniferus (Blommers-Schlösser and Blanc, 1991)
- Gephyromantis striatus (Vences, et al., 2002)
- Gephyromantis tahotra Glaw, Köhler, and Vences, 2011
- Gephyromantis tandroka (Glaw and Vences, 2001)
- Gephyromantis thelenae (Glaw and Vences, 1994)
- Gephyromantis tohatra Scherz, et al., 2017
- Gephyromantis tschenki (Glaw and Vences, 2001)
- Gephyromantis verrucosus Angel, 1930
- Gephyromantis webbi (Grandison, 1953)
- Gephyromantis zavona (Vences, et al., 2003)
