= Franco Andreone =

Italian zoologist (born 1961)

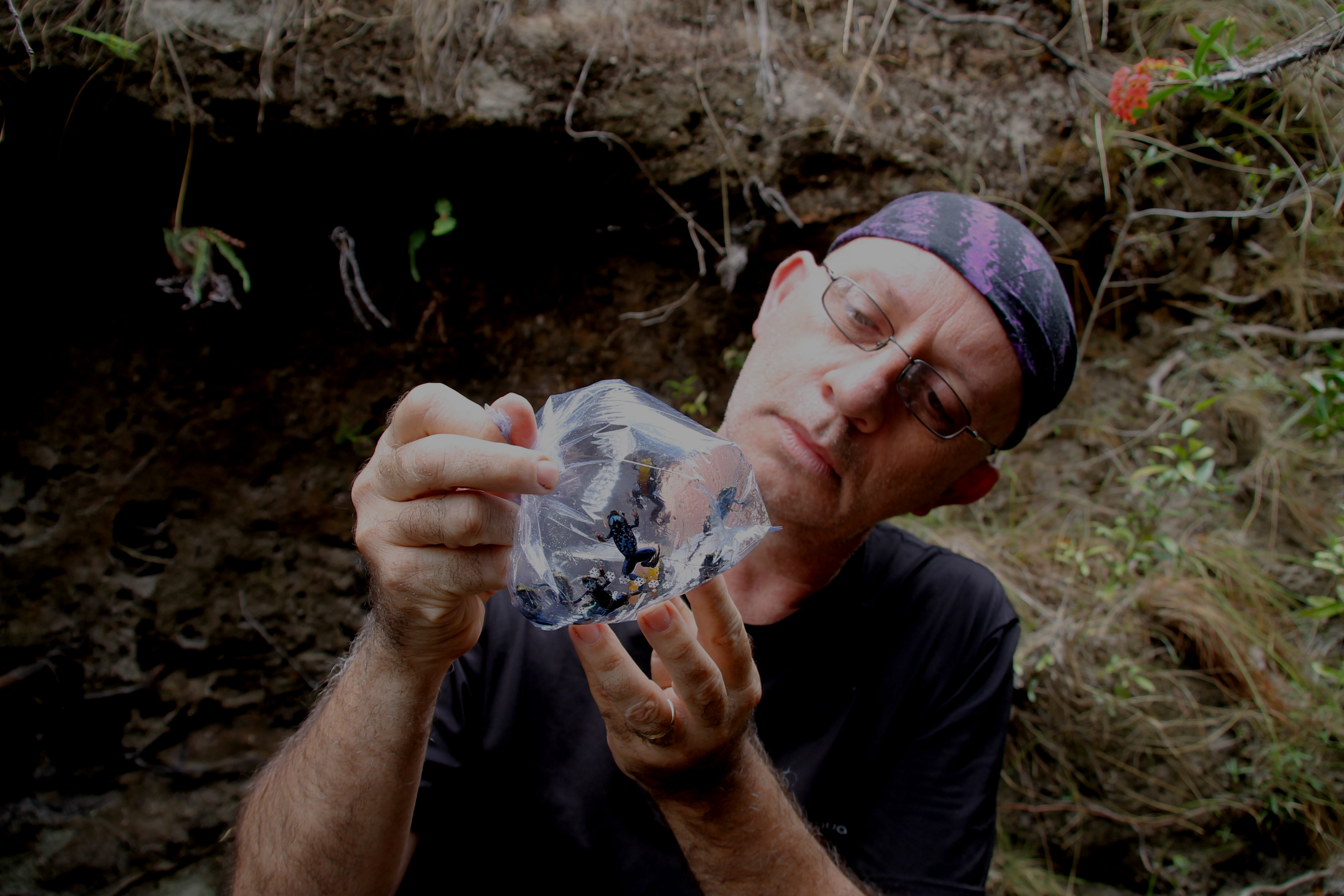
- Franco Andreone in Madagascar with Mantella expectata
- Born: 23 May 1961 (age 65); Turin, Italy
- Education: University of Turin, University of Bologna
- Known for: Amphibian and reptile conservation, Madagascar biodiversity
- Scientific career
- Fields: Zoology, Herpetology
- Workplaces: Museo Regionale di Scienze Naturali di Torino

Franco Andreone (born 23 May 1961) is an Italian zoologist and herpetologist.

== Biography ==
After graduating in 1985 with a degree in Biological Sciences from the University of Turin, he obtained a PhD in Animal Biology at the University of Bologna and associated institutions (1991). Since May 1991, he has been curator of the zoology section at the Museo Regionale di Scienze Naturali di Torino, in charge of the herpetology and vertebrate collections. He is also Editor-in-chief of the museum’s publications (bulletin, monographs, catalogues, proceedings, naturalists, natural history series), as well as of the international journal Natural History Collections and Museomics. Since issue 126, he has been co-editor of FrogLog, published by the IUCN. Since 2023, he has been the "Focal Person" for the Species Survival Commission (SSC) of IUCN Italy.

Since 1988, Andreone has carried out research on amphibians and reptiles of Madagascar, conducting numerous field missions in both rainforests and deciduous forests, while promoting conservation actions.

From 2006 to 2021, he was Chair of the IUCN SSC Amphibian Specialist Group for Madagascar, and since 2020 he has chaired the TAG Asian Toad organized by the Madagascar Fauna and Flora Group. He promoted and coordinated several meetings and symposia on nature conservation in Madagascar. In particular, he organized the first conference A Conservation Strategy for the Amphibians of Madagascar (ACSAM) in Antananarivo from 19–21 September 2006. From this meeting he launched and coordinated the ACSAM project, which led to the Sahonagasy Action Plan.

In 2014, together with other conservationists, he organized the workshop ACSAM2, held at Centre ValBio in Ranomafana, Madagascar. Leading herpetologists active in Madagascar attended. In 2018 he coordinated a meeting in Ambositra to launch the action plan for the harlequin mantella Mantella cowanii, one of Madagascar’s most threatened amphibians. The outcome was the McAP – Mantella cowanii Action Plan, published in November 2020.

He has also studied and promoted conservation of Italian herpetofauna. He edited the atlas of amphibians and reptiles of Piedmont and Aosta Valley, contributed to the Italian herpetological atlas, and co-edited the Fauna d’Italia volume on amphibians.

In 2019 he published a book of watercolours entitled In Madagascar - Fra le rane e altri animali. The same year, with Matteo Di Nicola, Luca Cavigioli and Luca Luiselli, he co-authored Anfibi e rettili d'Italia, published by Edizioni Belvedere, with a second revised edition in 2021.

== Science communication ==
Andreone has been active in science communication and public engagement on biodiversity conservation, especially concerning amphibians and reptiles.

He conceived and organized the outreach series HerpeThon in 2011, 2013 and 2015, as well as several Madagascar Days in Italian cities including Turin, Rome, Trento, Venice, and others between 2011 and 2019.

In 2017, in collaboration with the CinemAmbiente Festival, he produced the videomapping Visioni della Sesta Estinzione, projecting images of extinct and endangered vertebrates onto the Mole Antonelliana.

He also organized the 2022 XIV Congress of the Societas Herpetologica Italica in Turin, where he launched the TO-herp Project for monitoring urban amphibians and reptiles.

In 2023, to mark the bicentenary of Alfred Russel Wallace, he launched the program #IniziativaWallace to promote Wallace’s legacy to the public.

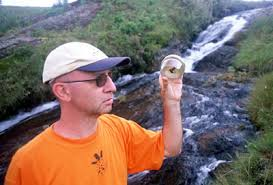
Franco Andreone in central Madagascar observing Mantella cowanii

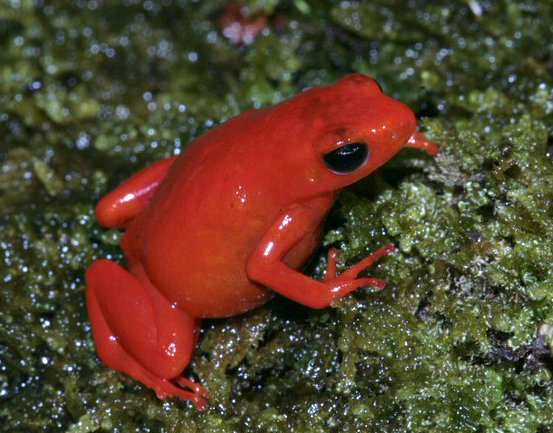
Mantella aurantiaca, photographed by F. Andreone at Torotorofotsy

== New taxa described ==
Andreone has described numerous new species of amphibians and reptiles, often in collaboration with other researchers. Notably, he described the Alpine salamander Salamandra lanzai in the Cottian Alps, as well as many species from Madagascar (see updated list on his official website).

== Selected works ==
- Andreone F. (ed.), 2008. A Conservation Strategy for the Amphibians of Madagascar. Monografie XLV. Museo Regionale di Scienze Naturali, Torino.
- Andreone F., 2019. In Madagascar. Fra le rane e altri animali. Fiorina Edizioni, Varzi.
- Andreone F. et al., 2020. Mantella cowanii Action Plan 2021–2025. Museo Regionale di Scienze Naturali & Amphibian Survival Alliance, Torino.
- Andreone F. et al., 2016. New Sahonagasy Action Plan 2016–2020.
- Andreone F., Borgia M., 2011. Il canto della rana. Uno zoologo tra Torino e il Madagascar. Neos Edizioni.
- Andreone F. et al., 2008. The Challenge of Conserving Amphibian Megadiversity in Madagascar. PLoS Biology 6(5).
- Andreone F. et al., 2005. Species review of amphibian extinction risks in Madagascar: conclusions from the Global Amphibian Assessment. Conservation Biology, 19 (6): 1790–1802.
- Di Nicola M., Cavigioli L., Luiselli L. & Andreone F., 2019. Anfibi & Rettili d'Italia. Edizioni Belvedere, Latina.
- Dubos N. et al., 2019. Amphibian activity is driven by climate and shows weak seasonality in tropical rainforest. Biodiversity and Conservation, 1-019-01916-3.

== Awards ==
- In 2009 Andreone received the Sabin Amphibian Award, presented to researchers and personalities who have made major contributions to amphibian conservation worldwide.
- In 2023 he won the Green Book Literary Prize in the category "Journalistic Articles" with the essay Anfibi, vertebrati fragili. In 2025 he placed third with the article L'estinzione delle foreste del Madagascar. Templi della biodiversità in fumo.
