= Frank Glaw =

German herpetologist

Frank Rainer Glaw
- Born: 22 March 1966 (age 59); Düsseldorf, Germany
- Occupation: Herpetologist

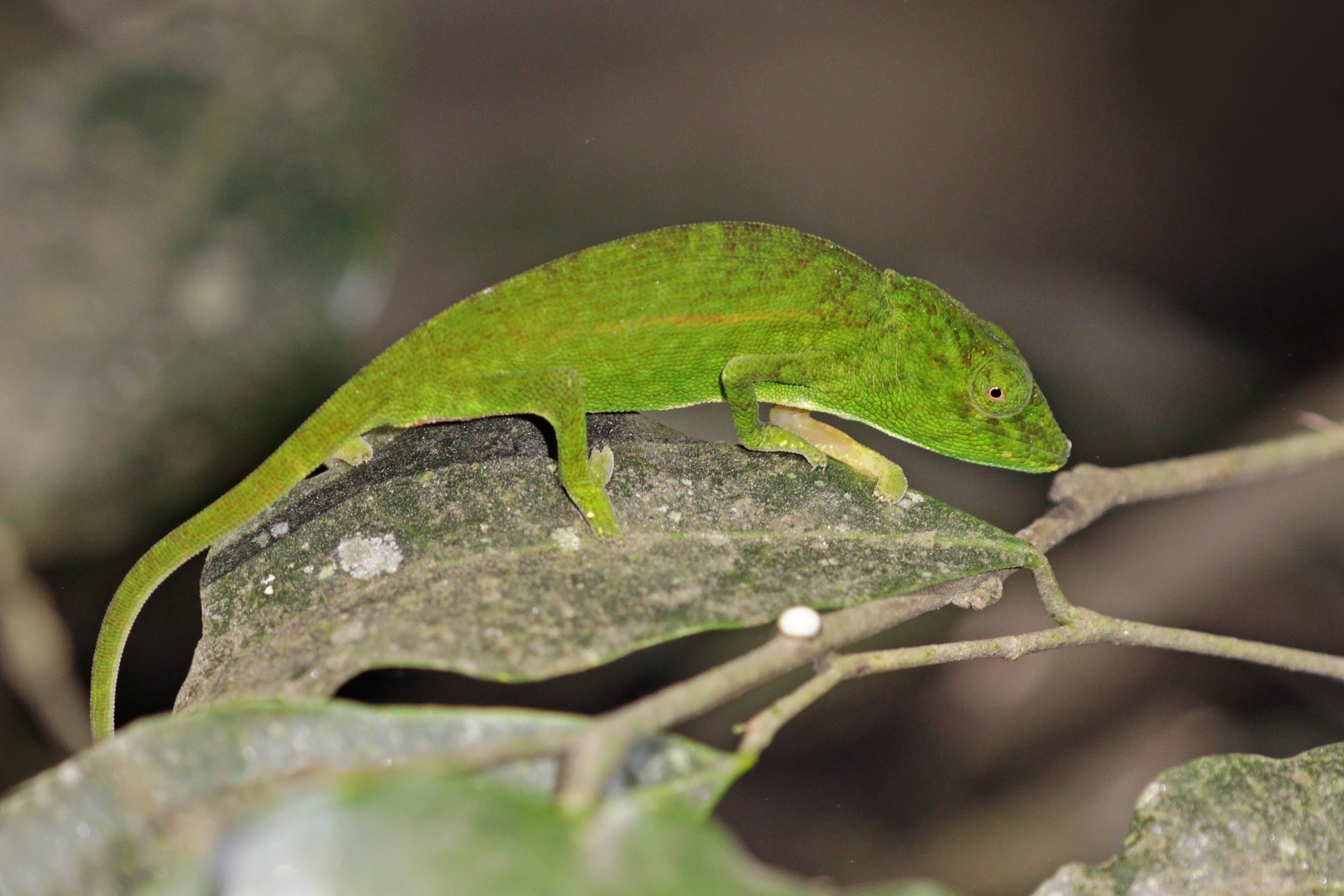
Glaw's chameleon (Calumma glawi)

Frank Rainer Glaw (born 22 March 1966 in Düsseldorf) is a German herpetologist working at the Zoologische Staatssammlung München. Glaw studied biology in Cologne from 1987, where he completed his diploma. Thereafter, he attended the University of Bonn, from which he graduated in 1999, after completing his Ph.D. thesis titled Untersuchungen zur Bioakustik, Systematik, Artenvielfalt und Biogeographie madagassischer Anuren about the frogs of Madagascar, supervised by Professor Wolfgang Böhme.

Since 1997, he has been the curator of herpetology at the Zoologische Staatssammlung München. Glaw's focus during and after his thesis work was the herpetofauna of Madagascar. Since the end of the 1980s, he has been working closely with Miguel Vences, currently professor for evolutionary biology and zoology at the Technische Universität Braunschweig. Together, they published A Field Guide to the Amphibians and Reptiles of Madagascar in 1992, a benchmark work on the amphibians and reptiles of Madagascar, which, supported by the World Bank, was translated into Malagasy and made freely available online. It is now in its third edition.

Glaw is a contributing author on over 200 descriptions of Madagascan taxa, such as the chameleon Brookesia micra and the microhylid frog Stumpffia pygmaea.

Several species are named after Frank Glaw: a species of chamaeleon, Calumma glawi; a species of protist, Eimeria glawi; and a species of stick insect, Glawiana glawi.
