= Miguel Vences =

German herpetologist and evolutionary biologist

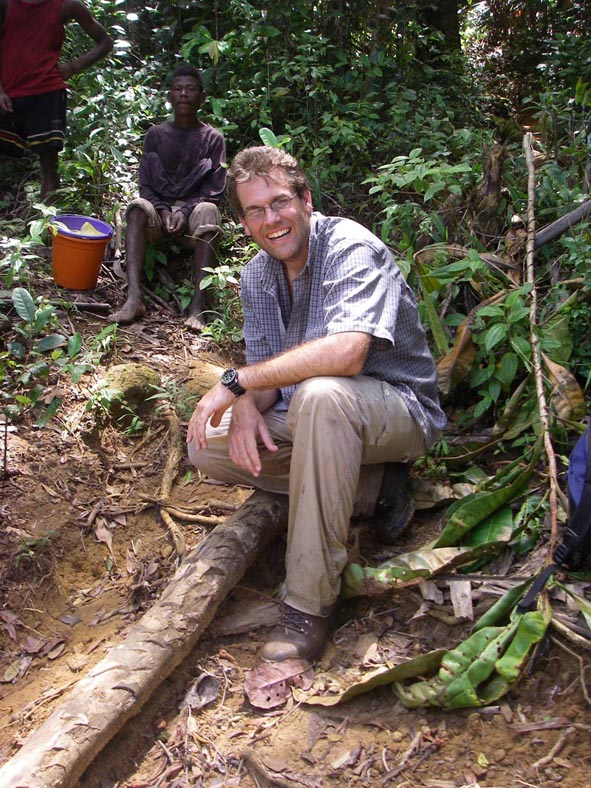
- Born: 24 April 1969 (age 57); Cologne, Germany
- Occupations: Herpetologist, professor

Professor Miguel Vences (born 24 April 1969 in Cologne) is a German herpetologist and evolutionary biologist. Much of his research is focused on the reptiles and amphibians of Madagascar.

== Life ==
The son of Galician philosopher Sergio Vences Fernández (1936–2012), Vences attended the Schiller-Gymnasium Köln from 1979 to 1988, and graduated with the German Abitur. The following year he began to study Biology at the University of Cologne. There he met Frank Glaw, and as undergraduate students they undertook their first excursions to Madagascar. After completing the Vordiplom in 1993, Vences transferred to the University of Bonn and the Museum König, where he completed his Diplom studies. Vences continued his studies there as a PhD student under the supervision of Wolfgang Böhme until 2000. His thesis was on the evolutionary history of true frogs (Ranoidea) and related families in Madagascar. Thereafter, he worked for one year at the National Museum of Natural History of France in Paris, before returning to Germany in 2001 to work at the University of Konstanz. In 2002 he worked at the University of Amsterdam and the Zoological Museum of Amsterdam as assistant professor and Leader of the Vertebrate section. In 2005 he moved to the Braunschweig University of Technology as a professor of evolutionary biology, where he works to this day. In 2013 he was elected into the Berlin-Brandenburg Academy of Sciences and Humanities, and in 2018 to the Academy of Sciences Leopoldina (the German National Academy of Sciences).

== Scientific work ==
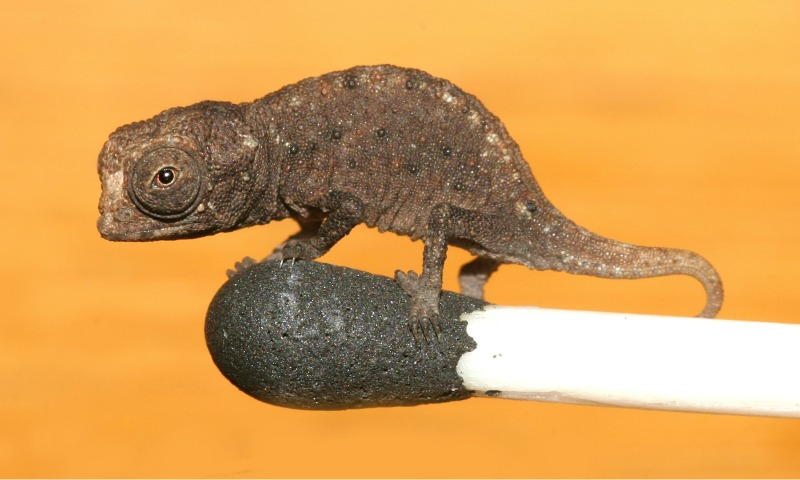
Among the many species described together with Glaw is Brookesia micra, one of the smallest reptile species.

The focus of Vences' work is on the amphibians and reptiles of Madagascar. He works together with Frank Glaw on many taxonomic species descriptions; together they have described over 200 new species of frogs, and numerous new species of snakes, chameleons, and other reptiles. In 1992, they produced a field guide to the reptiles and amphibians of Madagascar. In 1994 they produced a second edition of this guide, including the descriptions of numerous new taxa, and a significantly expanded reptile section. In 2007, a third edition was produced, which did not describe any new species, but included colour photographs and short text descriptions of over 100 unnamed species.

In recent years, Vences has been coauthor on several publications over a wide range of subjects, including but not limited to biogeography, amphibian disease and amphibian-associated microbiomes, population genetics, evolution and speciation, and taxonomy.

== Eponyms ==
Four species have been named after Vences:

- Calumma vencesi – Vences' chameleon
- Eimeria vencesi
- Rhabdias vencesi
- Hydrothelphusa vencesi
