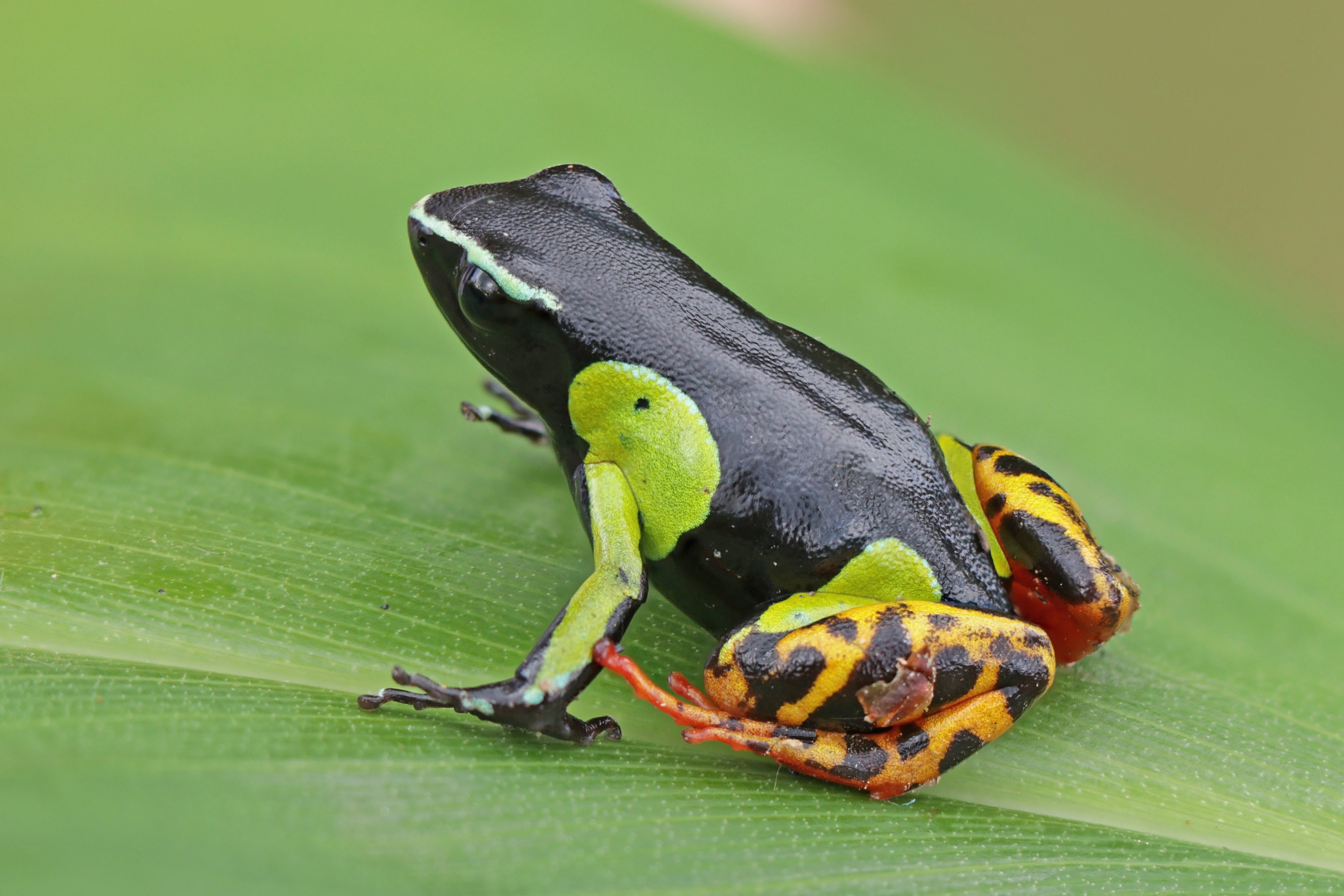
- Variegated golden frog (Mantella baroni)

Scientific classification
- Kingdom: Animalia
- Phylum: Chordata
- Class: Amphibia
- Order: Anura
- Superfamily: Ranoidea
- Family: Mantellidae; Laurent, 1946

Subfamilies
- Boophinae; Laliostominae; Mantellinae
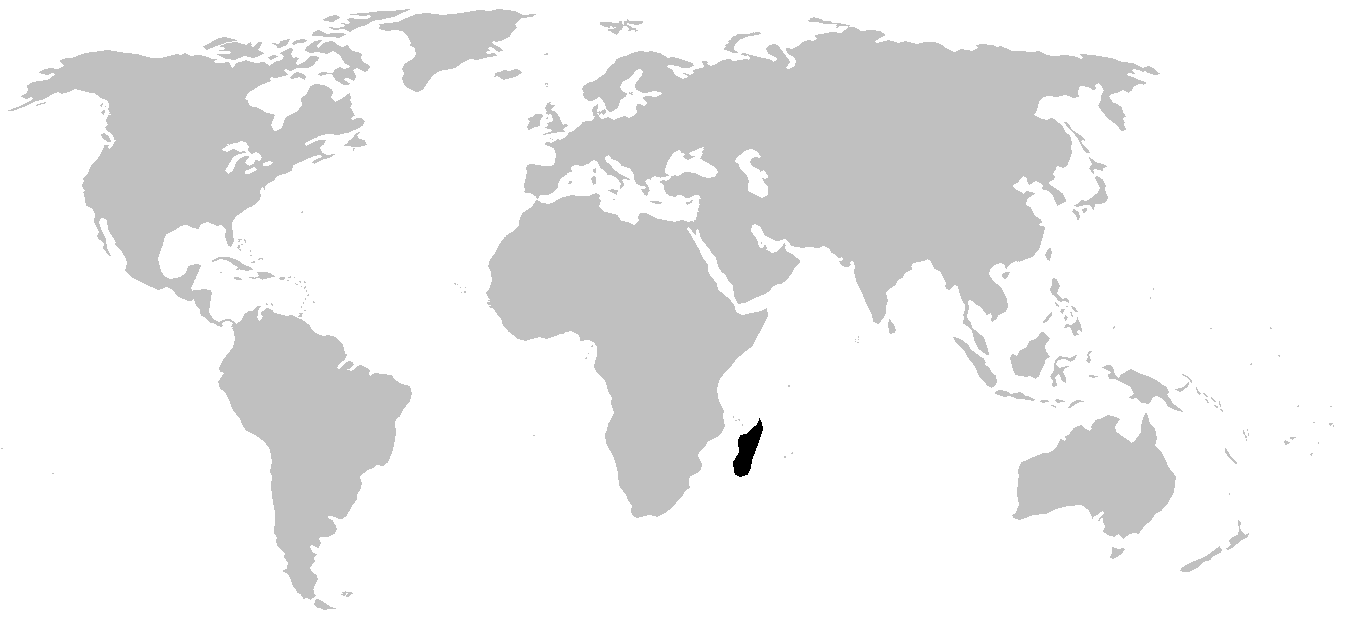
- Distribution of Mantellidae (in black)

= Mantellidae =

Family of amphibians

The Mantellidae are an amphibian family of the order Anura (frogs and toads), and are endemic to the Indian Ocean islands of Madagascar and Mayotte. At first glance, the diminutive, brightly-coloured mantellas appear visually similar to (and indeed fill similar ecological niches as) the Latin American poison dart frogs, such as Dendrobates, Oophaga and Phyllobates, among others.

== Systematics ==
The family Mantellidae is composed of three extremely diverse groups of frogs, across three subfamilies: the Mantellinae (Laurent, 1946) are typically terrestrial or semi-aquatic frogs, the Laliostominae (Vences & Glaw, 2001) are terrestrial, fairly large frogs, and the Boophinae (Vences & Glaw, 2001) are arboreal tree frogs, sharing far more physical and behavioral characteristics with true tree frogs than the tiny mantellids.

Apart from the genera assigned to the three subfamilies, the actual placement of Tsingymantis (Glaw, Hoegg & Vences, 2006) is still uncertain.

As of 22 September 2022, at least 237 species are recognized in this family. DNA barcoding research has shown, however, that more than 100 distinct genetic lineages remain taxonomically undescribed.

== Evolution and island biogeography ==
The Mantellidae are Madagascar's most diverse frog family. It has been shown that there is a negative correlation between body size and species diversity in this family, which is probably related to the lower dispersal potential of smaller animals. This family is estimated to have colonized the island of Madagascar 76–87 million years ago. They are phylogenetically nested within Asian frogs, and therefore probably represent a dispersal event from Asia.

Two undescribed species of mantellid frogs are currently resident on the island of Mayotte, off Madagascar's west coast. These species belong to two genera that are otherwise exclusively endemic to Madagascar.

== Reproduction ==
Reproductive modes in the Mantellidae are highly varied. Eggs can be laid in or out of water, on the ground or on leaves, depending on genus and species. Guibemantis frogs of the subgenus Pandanusicola lay their eggs either in phytotelms or over slow-flowing water. Some species of Gephyromantis have direct development or nidicolous tadpoles. Members of the subfamilies Boophinae and Laliostominae have amplexus, but mantelline frogs do not. Parental care is known from a few species (e.g. Mantidactylus argenteus). Sexual size dimorphism is present in most species, with females being larger than males, but there are exceptions (e.g. Boophis albilabris), where males are larger than females, possibly as a result of males fighting for access to females.

== In captivity ==
Some members of this family are popular in the exotic pet trade for their bright colors (e.g. Mantella and Boophis).
