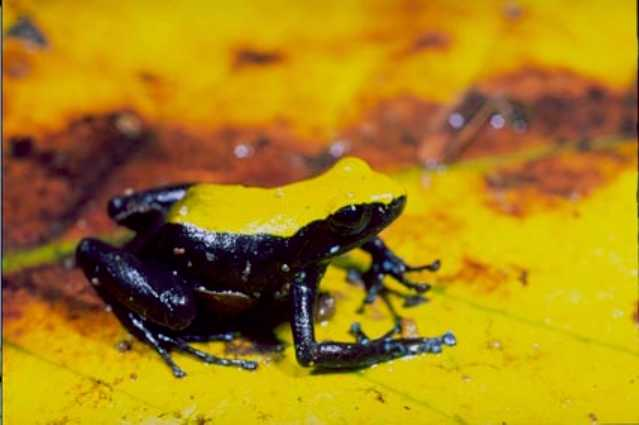

Conservation status
- Least Concern (IUCN 3.1)

Scientific classification
- Kingdom: Animalia
- Phylum: Chordata
- Class: Amphibia
- Order: Anura
- Family: Mantellidae
- Genus: Mantella
- Species: M. laevigata

Binomial name
- Mantella laevigata Methuen & Hewitt, 1913

= Climbing mantella =

Species of frog

The climbing mantella (Mantella laevigata) is a species of diurnal poison frog of the genus Mantella that resides in the subtropical regions of northeast Madagascar. Although it spends a significant amount of time in trees or bamboo forests, this frog species is not fully arboreal and actively seeks areas with a water source.

Like others in the Mantella genus, the climbing mantella has aposematic coloration, which warns predators of its toxic secretions. The lipophilic alkaloids, the building blocks of the poison, are derived from dietary arthropods. The climbing mantella consumes a variety of small insects, and its diet changes dramatically with varying seasons.

Climbing mantella engage in unique reproductive behaviors that revolve around arboreal oviposition sites. Males compete with one another over the shallow pools of water where females lay their eggs. Climbing mantella exhibit a high degree of parental care, which is unusual among frogs.

== Description ==
Considered a small frog, adult climbing mantella range from 24–30 millimetres (0.94–1.18 in) and weigh 1.2–2.0 grams (0.042–0.071 oz). Like other poison frogs, the climbing mantella is brightly colored. The anterior portion of its back is bright yellow or pale green. The arms, legs, abdomen, and posterior are black, with blue spots on the limbs. Its eyes are completely black. The climbing mantella has discs at the tip of its fingers and toes, which are webbed. The males are slightly smaller than the females, but it is difficult to identify the frog's sex using physical characteristics. Males are best recognized by their mating calls.

Species that resemble this frog are M. betsileo, M. viridis, and M. expectata; however, these frogs are differently colored and often have blue spots on their throats rather than limbs. Unlike the climbing mantella, these species have a faint line running along their upper lip.

== Habitat and distribution ==
The climbing mantella is found in the northeast coastal region of Madagascar in lowland rainforests and bamboo groves. This species can be found in several protected areas of Madagascar, including Mananara-Nord National Park, Marojejy National Park, Masoala National Park, Nosy Mangabe Special Reserve, and Betampona Natural Reserve. The favorable humidity level is 80% to 100%. Climbing mantella can withstand a 17–30 °C (63–86 °F) temperature range, which is relatively large compared to other amphibian species. However, the most suitable temperature level is 20–26 °C (68–79 °F).

== Conservation ==
The International Union for Conservation of Nature Red List of Threatened Species (IUCN Red List) listed the climbing mantella as least concern in 2016, due to its wide geographical distribution and presumed large population. The IUCN Red List previously listed it as near-threatened in 2004 and 2008.

Despite its listing, the climbing mantella population is suspected to be decreasing. Regions of Madagascar outside of protected reserves are at increased risk of deforestation. Greater demand for cattle grazing areas, farmland, and space to build cities may jeopardize the climbing mantella's natural habitat. Currently, the international pet trade levels for this frog species do not present a serious threat to the population, though continued trade regulation is necessary to maintain local populations of climbing mantella.

== Taxonomy ==
The climbing mantella belongs to the family Mantellidae and the genus Mantella. Mantellidae are endemic to the islands of Madagascar and Mayotte. The climbing mantella's closest relative is likely the green mantella (M. viridis).

== Diet ==
Climbing mantella eat ants, insect larvae, mites, and other insects. Unlike similar frogs from the family Dendrobatidae, the climbing mantella is not an ant specialist; its food consumption volume and diet composition vary dramatically based on seasonality. Climbing mantella do not seem to prefer a specific type of prey and consume whatever is readily available in leaf litter.

Ants comprise approximately 84% of the frog's diet during the dry season, but only 35% during the wet season. Over half of all consumed ants were of the genus Pheidole. During the dry season, climbing mantella consume approximately 44% more in absolute volume compared to the wet season. Overall, climbing mantella have a more varied diet during the wet season. Wet-season frogs consume significantly more insect larvae, mites, and other arthropods (including spiders and small beetles) compared to dry season counterparts. Diet shifts may be a result of varying prey availability during seasons, rather than specific behavioral changes.

Climbing mantella tadpoles will consume unfertilized or fertilized eggs of their own species. Tadpoles are only known to consume conspecific eggs, and ignore mosquitoes or other small arthropod larvae.

== Mating ==
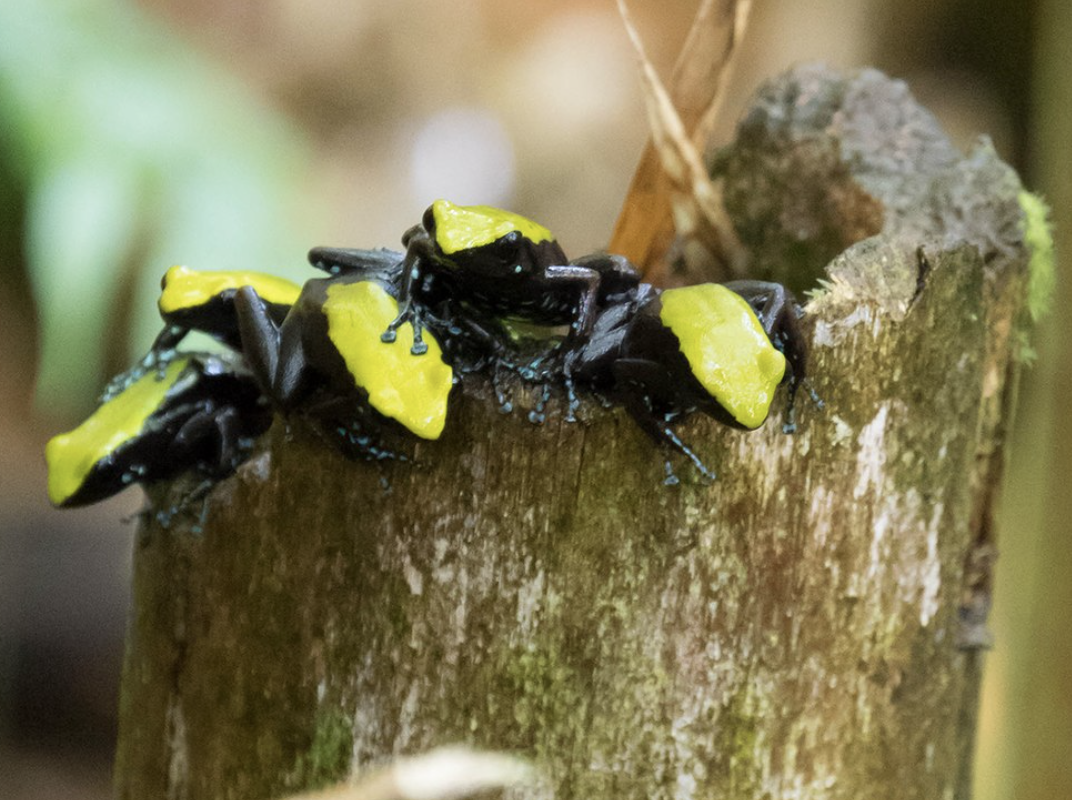
Group of climbing mantella in a bamboo stalk well.

=== Male-male competition ===
Males compete with one another for territory. Fighting bouts over territory take the form of wrestling, chasing, and leaping. These conflicts last anywhere from 10 seconds to over 1.5 hours. The resident male, usually the aggressor, typically wins the fight. When not in their own territory, male frogs will infrequently invade the territory of other males, hoping to mate with more females. On rare occasions, the intruder can convince females to mate in a well possessed by another male. If the territory resident discovers the intruder, the intruder can either initiate a fighting bout or submissively yield to amplexus. Resident males will not attempt to mate with an unresponsive frog, and the resident will leave the submitted invader after a couple of minutes.

=== Female-male interactions ===
Although it is the only semi-arboreal member of the Mantella genus, the forest environment plays an important role in the climbing mantella's reproductive behavior. Males are highly territorial, claiming a given area of approximately 2 square metres (22 sq ft). Each territory contains at least one water-filled well (phytotelmata; often found in tree holes or broken bamboo stalks), and male frogs defend these possible oviposition sites from their rivals. Male climbing mantella choose wells based on the presence of crane flies, which prey on frog eggs, and other frog species. A greater amount of crane flies and other frog species correlates to a less desirable well.

Female frogs will approach male frogs who advertise their territory with a two-tone call. Female frogs are either mute or have weak calls. Upon hearing the mating calls, female frogs will approach the well occupied by males. The male frog adopts a softer single-note courtship call, and the female frog proceeds to judge the well. The mating calls only attract female frogs to the male's territory, and have no bearing on mate selection. Instead, mate selection from the perspective of the female is entirely based on the quality of the male's well. Female frogs frequently abandon a male frog after inspecting the location. Thus, well sites are a limiting resource. The most desirable well sites often have eggs from multiple different mating pairs. The climbing mantella is the only member of the Mantella genus to use phytotelmata for breeding purposes.

== Parental care ==
=== Egg-laying ===
Climbing mantella usually only lay one large egg (3–3.5 millimetres (0.12–0.14 in)), characteristics common among frogs with a high degree of parental care. Female frogs lay their eggs at the side of wells or above the water line, exhibiting a form of terrestrial oviposition–another indicator of high parental investment. The climbing mantella is the only member of the genus Mantella where parent frogs care for oophagous tadpoles.

=== Site selection for egg-laying ===
Female climbing mantella engage in trophic egg laying, and care for their young by feeding them their unfertilized eggs (a behavior known as oophagy). When engaging in maternal care, female frogs ignore male mating calls and climb wells alone, depositing their unfertilized eggs at or below the water line in the well. The tadpole that resides in the well will then consume the trophic eggs. It is believed that maternal care is not obligatory, depending more on circumstance and environment than natural behavior.

=== Territory defense as paternal care ===
Male territorial defense is also considered a form of paternal care. The presence of a male climbing mantella in a well dissuades other species of frogs (esp. Plethodontohyla notostica and Anodonthyla boulengeri) from laying their eggs there. It is also possible that male frogs discourage land crabs, which have been observed from eating climbing mantella eggs, from entering wells.

Males also engage in parental care considered to be reproductive parasitism. If a male possesses a desirable well containing one of his offspring, he will always benefit: a male's reproductive success increases with each reproductive event, because it either produces another one of his offspring or results in the creation of a new egg that will feed his existing offspring. Thus, males will often take females to wells that already contain their developing eggs or tadpoles.

=== Reproductive parasitism ===
Both male and female frogs contribute to the tadpole's sole diet of conspecific eggs. Female frogs will lay unfertilized eggs into wells that contain their offspring. Male frogs exhibit a form of reproductive parasitism by luring female frogs to wells that often contain offspring only belonging to the male. Any fertilized egg resulting from the courtship subsequently serves as food for tadpoles that are only related to the male. Female frogs develop mechanisms to defend themselves against parasitism and avoid laying their eggs in wells containing other tadpoles. In response, tadpoles evolve ways to evade detection by females.

== Defense ==
The evolution of chemical defense in members of the genus Mantella (including the climbing mantella) is an exceptional example of convergent evolution. Dendrobatidae and Mantella have developed similar behavioral and physiological adaptations, despite being relatively unrelated.

Poisonous lipophilic alkaloids stored in skin glands are the effective defensive chemicals. 41 different potent alkaloids have been found in climbing mantellas' skin. Captive frogs lose their toxicity over time, indicating that the climbing mantella's wild diet of arthropods contains the chemicals needed to construct the alkaloids. Alkaloids are retained in frogs for long periods of time, and thus the link between seasonality and alkaloid composition is still unclear. While some researchers have found that seasonality plays a significant role in the absence or presence of alkaloids, other studies show that this did not lead to dramatic changes in climbing mantellas' overall alkaloid profile.
