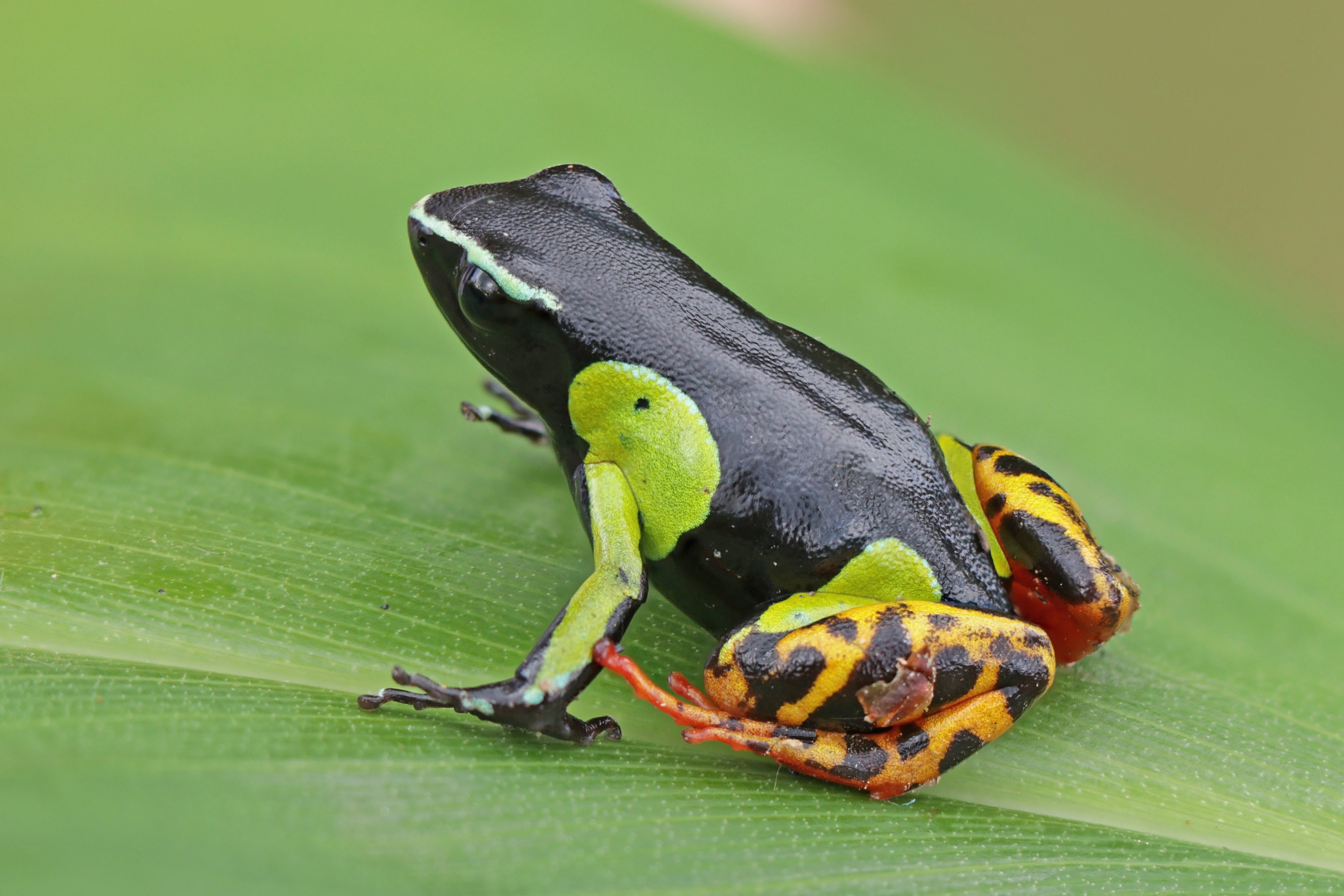
- Ranomafana National Park

Conservation status
- Least Concern (IUCN 3.1)

Scientific classification
- Kingdom: Animalia
- Phylum: Chordata
- Class: Amphibia
- Order: Anura
- Family: Mantellidae
- Genus: Mantella
- Species: M. baroni

Binomial name
- Mantella baroni Boulenger, 1888

Synonyms
- Phrynomantis maculatus Thominot, 1889

= Mantella baroni =

Species of amphibian (frog)

Mantella baroni (often known by its common names, such as Baron's mantella, the variegated golden frog, or the Madagascar poison frog) is a species of small poisonous frog in the family Mantellidae.

The species was first formally described by George Albert Boulenger in 1888, who penned the species' binomial after Richard Baron, an English botanist and missionary to Madagascar, who collected and studied the species.

== Distribution, habitat, and conservation status ==
Like other species in Mantellidae, this taxon is endemic to Madagascar. This family is estimated to have colonized the island of Madagascar 76–87 million years ago, evolving in insular seclusion, and adaptively radiating in geographic range and number of species on the island. Mantellidae are phylogenetically related to Asiatic frogs, and therefore probably represent a dispersal event from Asia.

This is one of approximately 220 frog species (including 15 in Mantella) endemic only to Madagascar. It has a moderately-large elongated geographic range in East-Central Madagascar, inland from the east coast, and spanning north to south, from Fierenana south to Andringitra.

Its natural habitats are subtropical or tropical moist lowland forest, subtropical or tropical moist montane forest, rivers, and degraded former forest. It typically prefers residing at elevations between 600-1200 meters above sea level.

Although it has been classified as a Least Concern species by the IUCN as of 2016, due to its relatively wide distribution, population trends are technically unknown, and it may be threatened by several sources of habitat loss. These include anthropogenic encroachment from commercialization and industrialization, timber and logging operations, and agriculture. It appears in CITES Appendix II.

== Description ==
Though only 28–32 mm in length at maturity, this species is one of the largest in the 16-species genus, dwarfed only by some individuals of Mantella viridis. Related Mantella species typically range from 18–31 mm in morphology for adult individuals. Mantella frogs generally exhibit sexual dimorphism, with the females (28–32 mm) of this species being slightly larger than the males (24–28 mm). This difference in size becomes prominent after approximately 10–12 months of age.

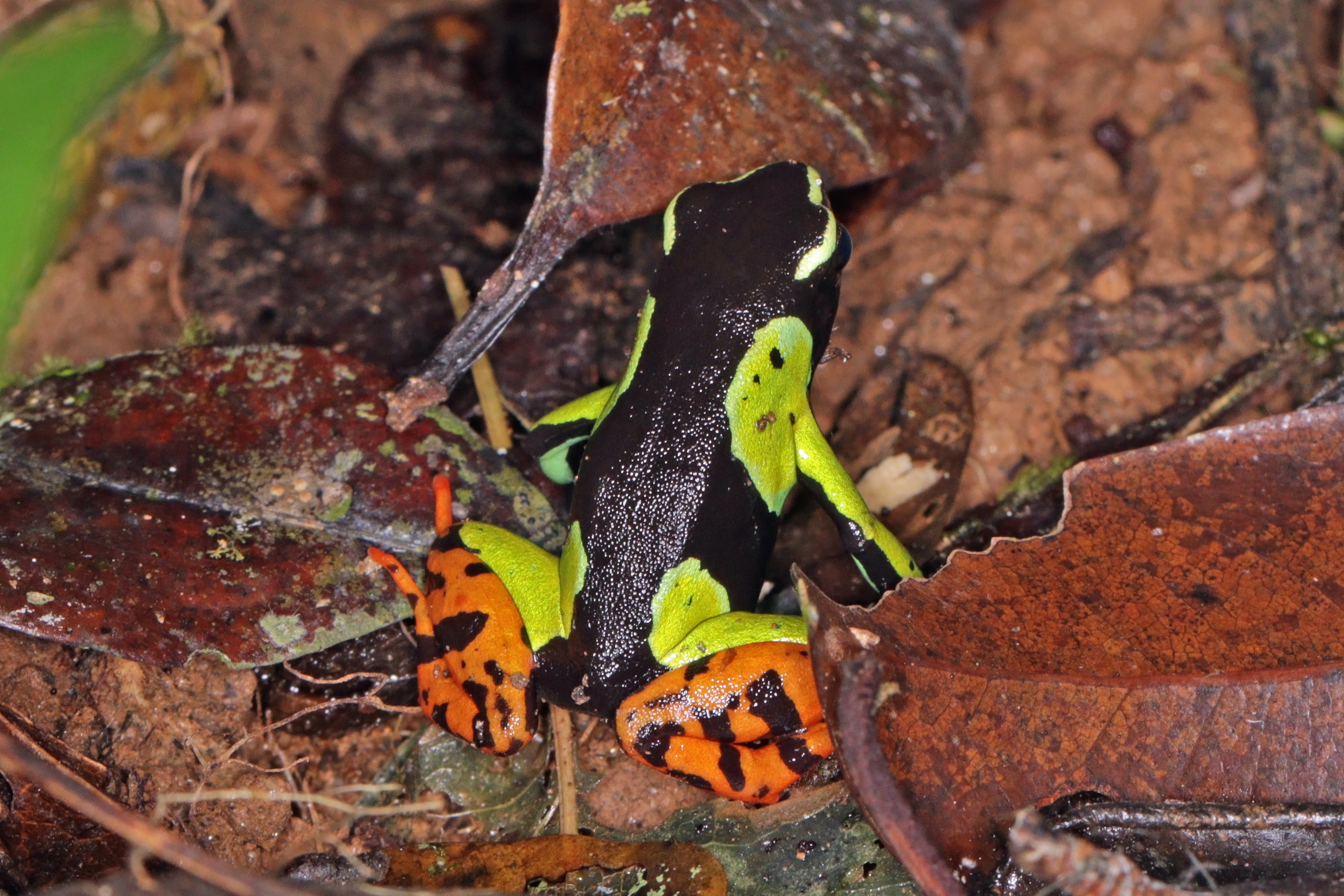
Dorsal view

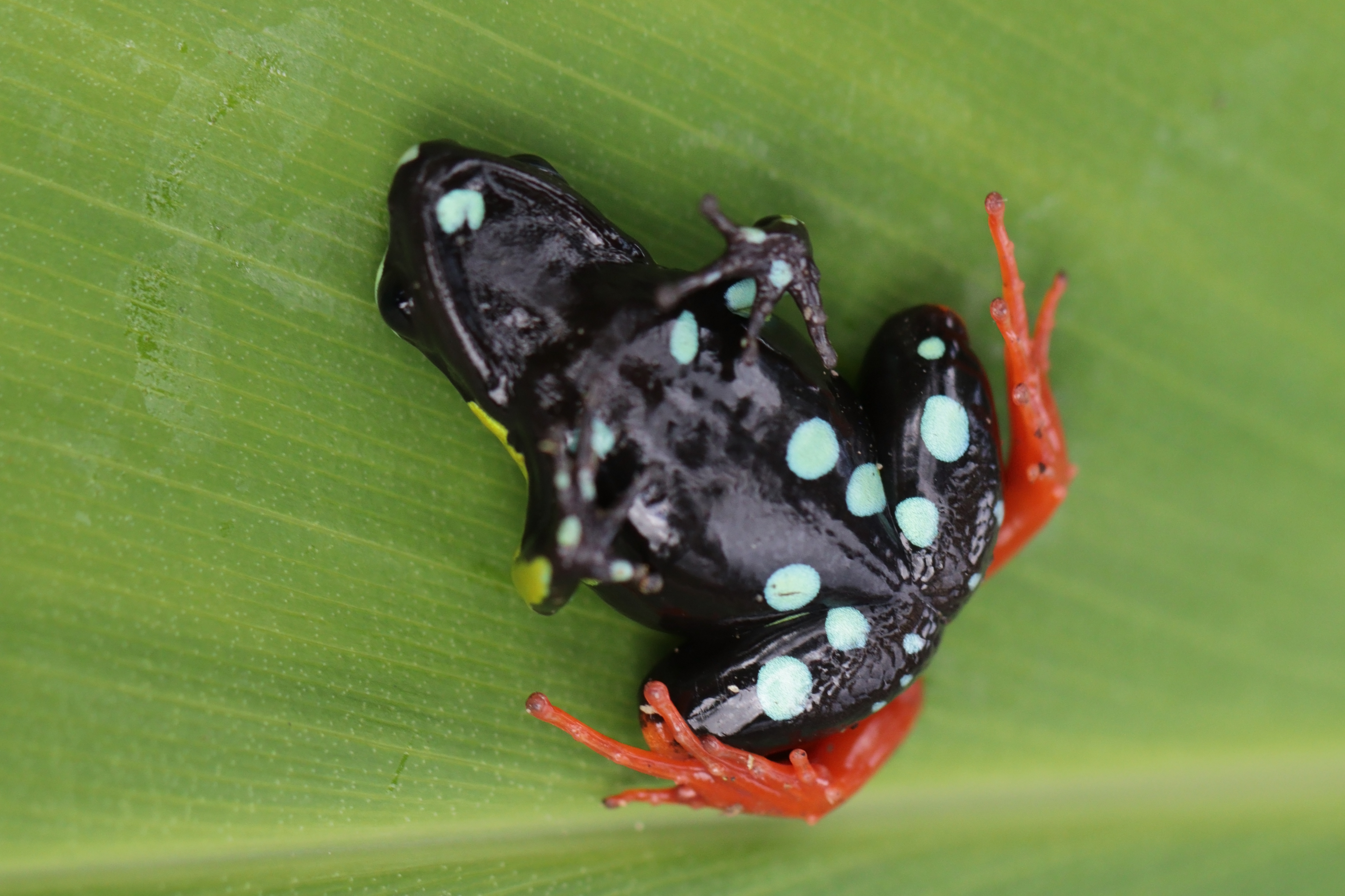
Ventral view

Most individuals in this species display specific unique characteristics that distinguish them from other Mantella species, such as a "light rostral line above the eyes" and "tiger-like markings on the hind limbs" of "orange with irregular black stripes", as seen in the images above. However, a wide variety of phenotypes exist, which manifest in front limb colors ranging from light greens to vibrant oranges and yellows, and are sometimes mistaken or imported into the international marketplace as Mantella cowanii.

Moreover, the "front limbs and femurs are yellow to greenish in appearance, with this coloration continuing up the flanks into a large, rounded flank blotch", which mirrors the commonplace appearance of the species Mantella madagascariensis, known as the painted mantella. These blotches "contrast with the black dorsum and striking orange and black legs" in both species, making it difficult for distributors, vendors, herpetologists, breeders, collectors, and pet owners to acquire the correct species. The easiest way to differentiate the two species is to note the "sky-blue, horseshoe-shaped marking" present on the throat of the painted mantella, as well as the lack of "flashmarks on the lower hindlimbs" on the Baron's mantella. Due to their similar appearance, the Baron's mantella is sometimes informally called a "painted mantella" as well, despite the painted mantella being a distinct species altogether.

Very similar species:

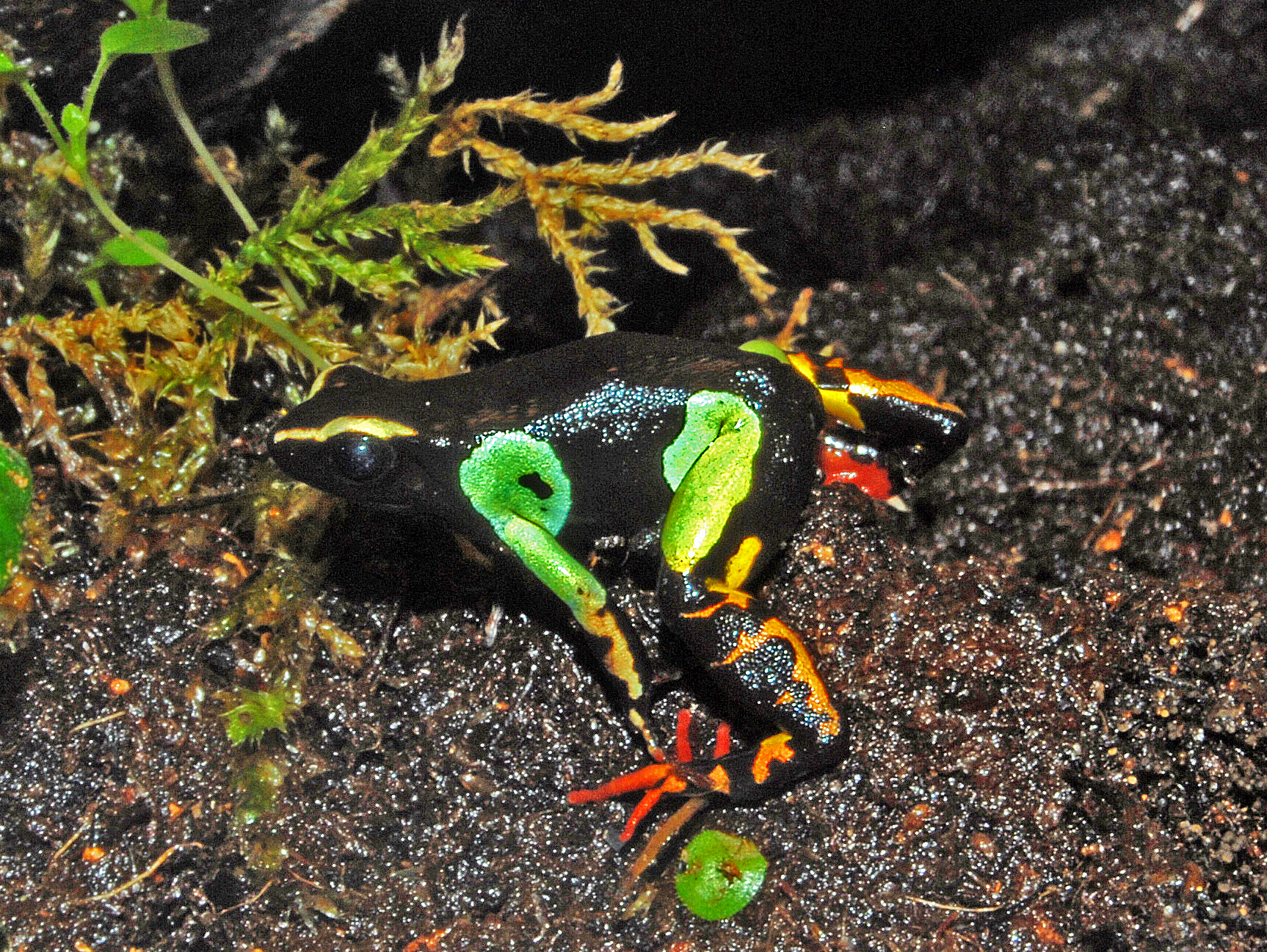
Mantella madagascariensis

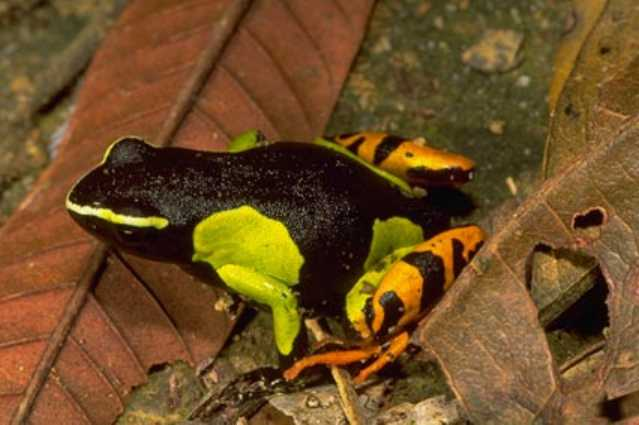
Mantella baroni

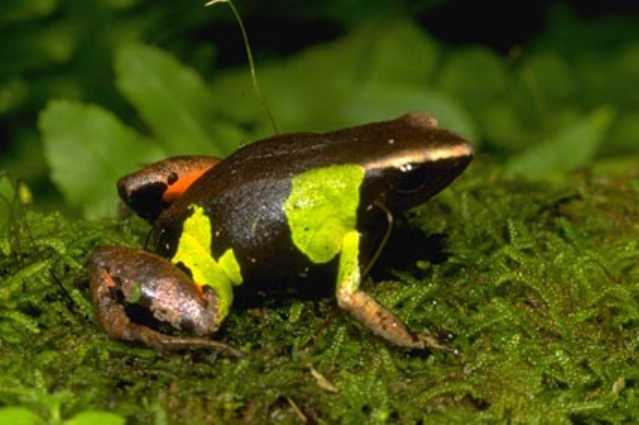
Mantella pulchra

As seen in the pictures above, M. baroni demonstrates strong aposomatic features on their front limbs, hind limbs, and rostral line. Similar aposomatic features – such as bright colorations, striking color differentials, and otherwise unconventional patterning – are common to all 16 species of Mantella, to varying levels of veracity (some species of Mantella have weaker toxicity and primarily use bright colors as a form of mimicry). Despite resembling the similarly-small poison dart frogs of Latin America, which also communicate their toxicity to potential predators through aposematism, Mantella species like the Baron's mantella are only distant taxonomic relatives. The existence of these similarities between these two families is an example of convergent evolution.

== Activity and reproduction ==
Male M. baroni emit "intense sequences of short, single-click notes during the day" in order to assert their territory or attract females for mating. Females can lay up to 130 unpigmented eggs in a single clutch, and almost always do so near a source of water, into which the resulting tadpoles get washed by rainwater.

== Diet, predation, and toxicology ==
Mantella baroni is a very active forager and can consume a greater number of prey (consisting of large arthropods) than any other Mantella species, consisting of large arthropods. While most frog species are nocturnal, the Mantella baroni is a diurnal hunter. Its diet consists mainly of ants, while also consuming a number of other types of arthropods like beetles, spiders, and mites.

Ingesting mites allows them to secrete high pharmacologically-active alkaloid concentrations in their skin, making them toxic to predators, with their bright colors serving as a warning sign that ingestion could be dangerous and induce sickness. The intensity of this alkaloid concentration can flux both temporally and geographically, but careless human handling is always discouraged. Human activity may influence the level of Mantella toxicity by polluting the environment, killing its sources of food and limiting an otherwise diversified diet, so remote populations may be more potent.
