= William Deans Cowan =

Scottish naturalist

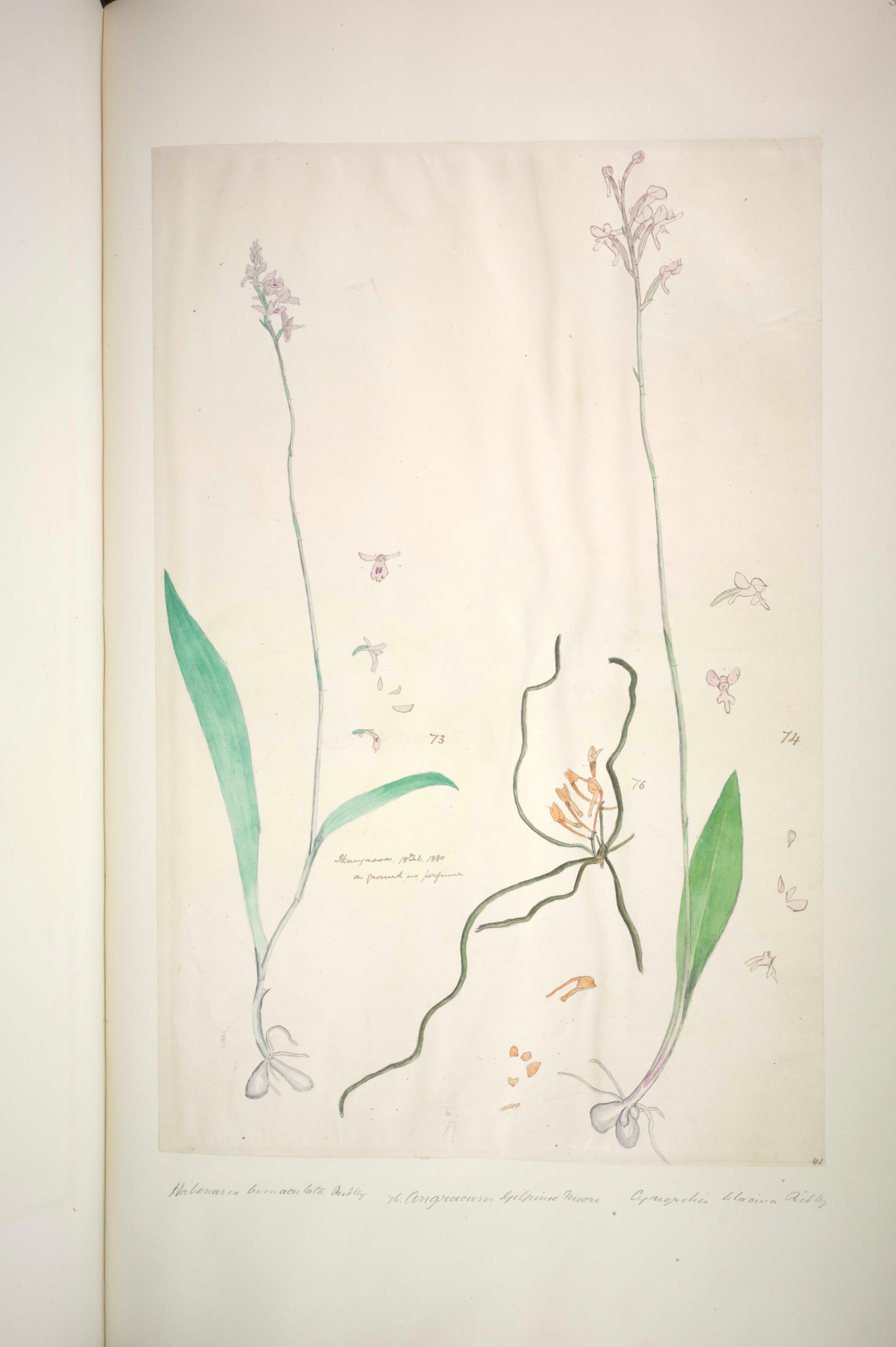
Orchid illustration by William Deans Cowan

William Deans Cowan (1844, Newbattle – 1924) was a Scottish naturalist.

== Life ==
Cowan was a member of the London Missionary Society who was sent to Madagascar (1874–1881), where he taught Malagasy students at Fianarantsoa. He was an authorities collector of natural history material including lemurs, birds, reptiles, molluscs and insects that were sent to the zoology department of the British Museum (Natural History) under Albert Günther (a total of 13,000–14,000 specimens). Much of his plant collection, is also held by that institutions herbarium then under William Carruthers. He also collected insects for John Obadiah Westwood, birds for Alfred Newton and orchids for Henry Nicholas Ridley. He was a Member of the Royal Geographical Society.

== Publications ==
- The Stone Elephant at Ambohisary. Antananarivo Annual 1878.
- The Tanala Country and People 1881.
- The Bara Land A description of the country and people LMS Press, Antananarivo 1881. "the land has been spied out; mountains are placed where they ought to be; rivers and villages are named with their proper names. The whole country is now mapped out, and all the guess geography of its past cleared up" Cowan
- List of Madagascar birds, together with the native names among a few of the different tribes.Friends’ Foreign Mission Association Antananariv, 1881.
- Madagascar — List of Ferns and other Cryptogamae, shewing their relation to Mauritius and Bourbon [London] (1881.) 8vo.
- Geographical Excursions In South Central Madagascar.London: Royal Geographical Society, 1882 which includes accounts of native tribes.
- Notes on the Natural History of Madagascar Proceedings of the Royal Physical Society of Edinburgh 1882

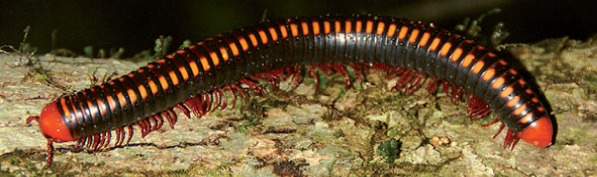
Cowan's giant fire millipede

Species named for him include

- Mantidactylus cowanii (Boulenger, 1882)
- Cowan's shrew tenrec Microgale cowani Thomas, 1882
- Charaxes cowani Butler, 1878
- Cowan's mantella Mantella cowanii Boulenger, 1882
- Pygora cowani Waterhouse, 1878
- Riparia paludicola cowani (Sharpe, 1882) London.
- Jumellea cowanii (Ridley, 1885)
- Cowan's giant fire millipede - Aphistogoniulus cowani (Butler, 1882)

== Tributes ==
Charles Price another missionary wrote of him "Naturalists are born not made.. .But Cowan was both born and made one. He has always had an instinctive love of hunting out birds' nests, watching the habits of animals, seeking their lairs, and making himself one with them, so that he would think nothing of carrying a few snakes in his pocket, a dozen beetles or so in his hat, and a frog or lizard carefully tied up in his best handkerchief."

Arthur G. Butler wrote "The Lepidoptera here enumerated [On a Collection of Lepidoptera recently received from Madagascar. By Arthur G. Butler, F.L.S., F.Z.S.] were collected by the Rev. William Dean Cowan. The series of butterflies in the collection represents rather less than one third of those hitherto recorded as occurring in Madagascar and, owing to the careful manner in which Mr. Cowan has recorded upon each envelope all facts known to him respecting the species therein contained, not a little information respecting the habits and distribution of the Mascarene forms has been gained."

"The greater part of the plants herein described were collected by the Rev. Wm. Deans Cowan in the east and centre f the island during the past few years. Mr. Cowan's attention, among plants, was especially directed to the Orchideae, of which, besides dried and spirit-specimens, he has brought home a good collection of coloured drawings, of no small value in a group of plants so difficult to preserve as Orchideae. In addition to these plants, I have added notes or descriptions of interesting plants from the collections of the late J. M. Hildebrandt, and of Hilsenberg and Bojer.All the plants, except where otherwise stated, are in the herbarium of the British Museum at South Kensington".Ridley, H. N. (1883). Descriptions and Notes on new or rare Monocotyledonous Plants from Madagascar

== See also ==
- James Sibree
- Richard Baron
- Wildlife of Madagascar
