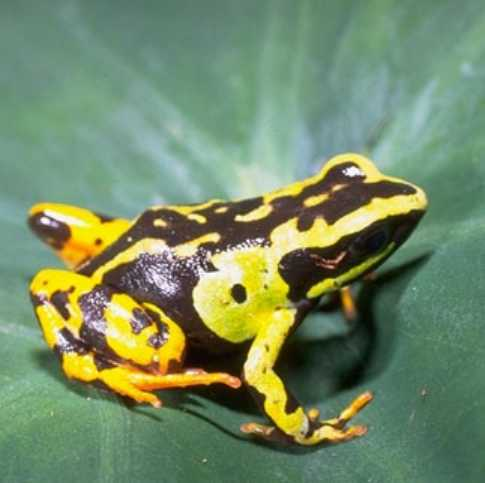

Conservation status
- Vulnerable (IUCN 3.1)

Scientific classification
- Kingdom: Animalia
- Phylum: Chordata
- Class: Amphibia
- Order: Anura
- Family: Mantellidae
- Genus: Mantella
- Species: M. madagascariensis

Binomial name
- Mantella madagascariensis (Grandidier, 1872)

Synonyms
- Dendrobates madagascariensis Grandidier, 1872; Mantella loppei Roux, 1935

= Madagascan mantella =

Species of frog

Mantella madagascariensis, common names Malagasy painted mantella, Madagascan mantella, Madagascar golden frog, Malagasy mantella and painted mantella, is a species of frog in the family Mantellidae.

== Distribution ==
This species is endemic to Madagascar. It is present in the East-central Madagascar in upland locations from near Niagarakely south to Ranomafana, at an elevation of 700–1,050 metres (2,300–3,440 ft) above sea level. It is threatened by habitat loss and it may be threatened by commercial collection.

== Habitat ==
Its natural habitats are subtropical or tropical moist lowland forest, subtropical or tropical moist montane forest, and rivers.

== Description ==
Mantella madagascariensis can reach a body length of 21–22 millimetres (0.83–0.87 in) in males, of 24–25 millimetres (0.94–0.98 in) in females. These tiny but stout frogs are rather variable in color and markings, as they are irregularly streaked in black and yellow. Usually they have a blackish body, but the dorsum is commonly black. A green or yellowish rostral stripe is running along the head. Femur and humerus are usually yellow to green, while tibia, tarsus and foot are reddish-orange, with blackish patches. Blotches of yellow-green color extends to flanks close to the forelimbs.

Some authors consider Mantella madagascariensis a complex of cryptic species.

This species is closely related to Mantella pulchra and very similar to Mantella baroni.

Very similar species:

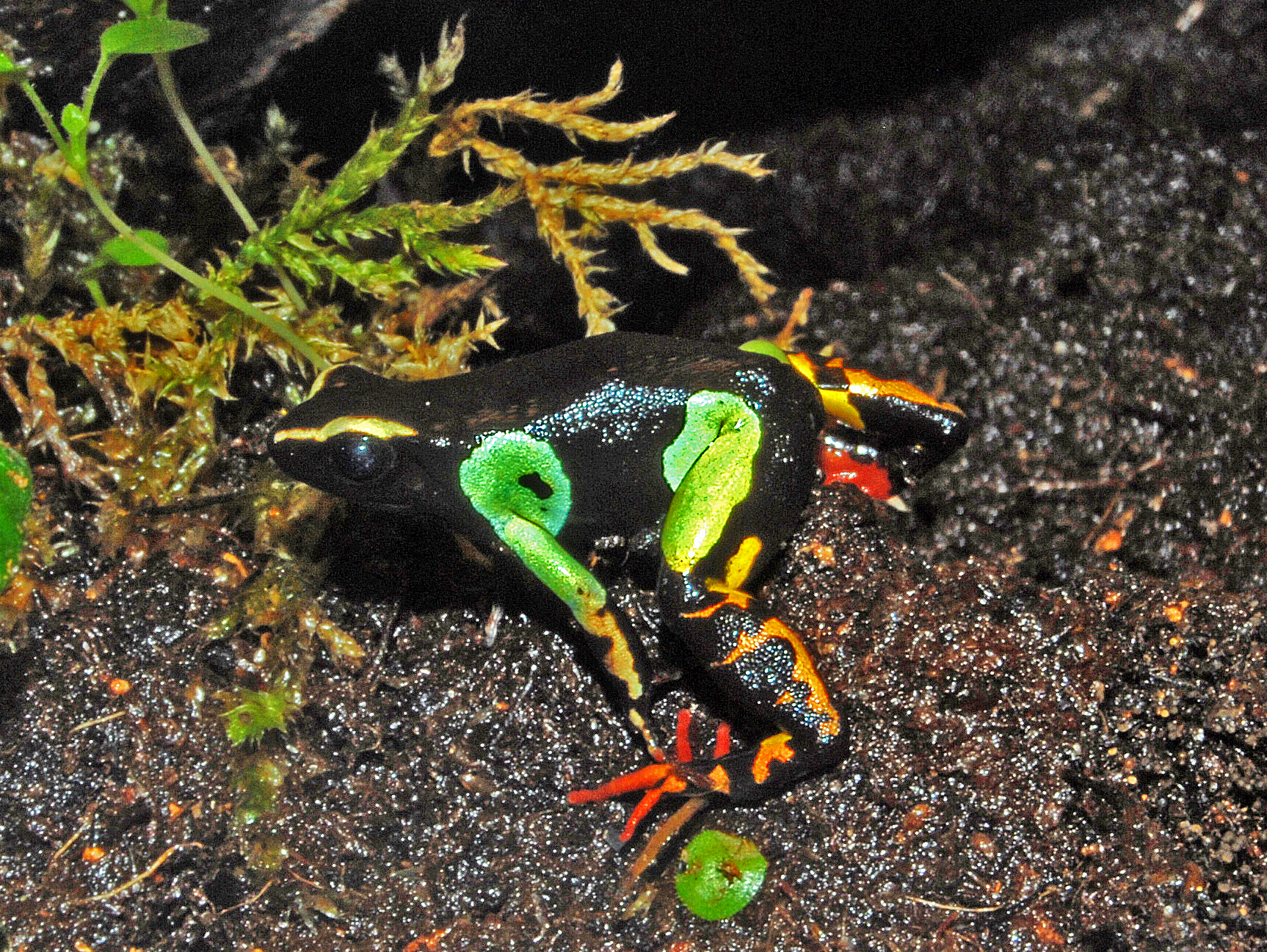
Mantella madagascariensis

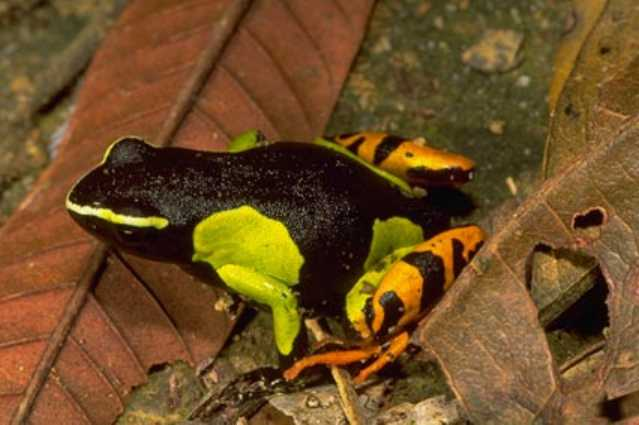
Mantella baroni

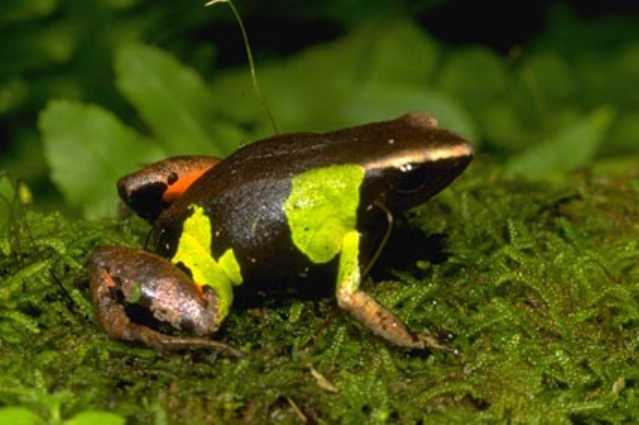
Mantella pulchra

Distribution map

== Biology ==
Little is known about the biology of the species. These frogs are terrestrial and are active on the ground during the day. They prefer forest and forest edge, especially along streams. Breeding occurs in streams. Females lay eggs on land, but the larvae develop in water streams. Like all Mantella species, these frogs has several toxic alkaloids in its skin.

== Bibliography ==
- Chiari, Y., M. Vences, D. R. Vieites, F. C. E. Rabemananjara, P. Bora, O. R. Ravoahangimalala, and A. Meyer. 2004. New evidence for parallel evolution of colour patterns in Malagasy poison frogs (Mantella). Molecular Ecology 13: 376303774
- Daly, J. W., N. R. Andriamaharavo, M. Andriantsiferana, and C. W. Myers. 1996. Madagascan poison frogs (Mantella) and their skin alkaloids. American Museum Novitates 3177: 1–34.
- Glaw, F., and M. Vences. 2006. Complete classification of species in the family Mantellidae Laurent, 1946. Organisms, Diversity & Evolution, Electronic Supplement 11(1): 1–3.
- Glaw, F., and M. Vences. 2007. A Field Guide to the Amphibians and Reptiles of Madagascar. Third edition. Cologne: Vences & Glaw Verlag
- Stuart, S. N., M. Hoffmann, J. Chanson, N. Cox, R. Berridge, P. Ramani, and B. Young eds., 2008. Threatened Amphibians of the World. Barcelona, Spain; International Union for the Conservation of Nature, Gland. Switzerland; Conservation International, Arlington, Virginia, U.S.A.: Lynx Editions.
- Vences, M., F. Glaw, and W. Böhme. 1999. A review of the genus Mantella (Anura, Ranidae, Mantellinae): taxonomy, distribution and conservation of Malagasy poison frogs. Alytes. Paris 17: 3–72
