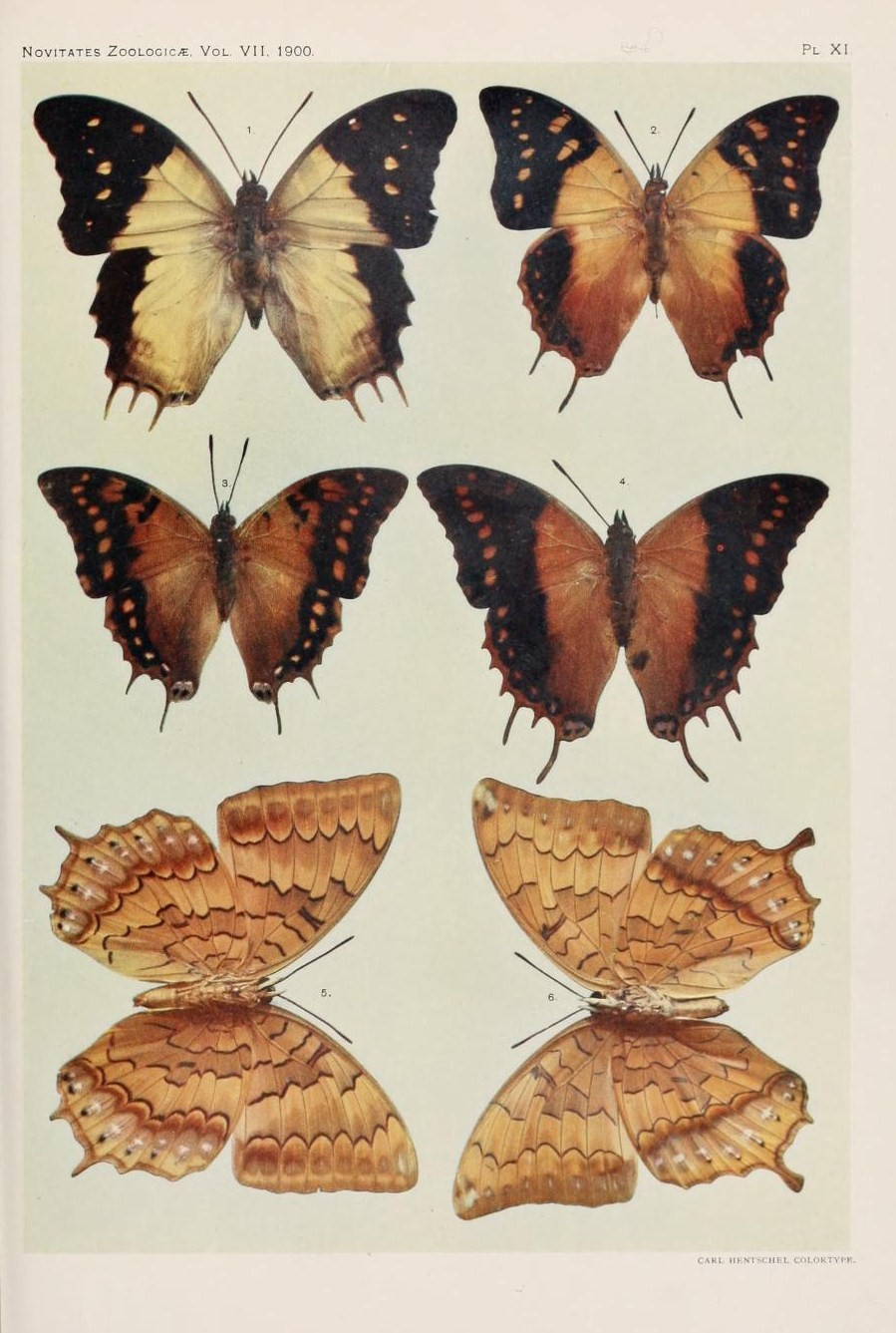
- Figure 4

Scientific classification
- Kingdom: Animalia
- Phylum: Arthropoda
- Class: Insecta
- Order: Lepidoptera
- Family: Nymphalidae
- Genus: Charaxes
- Species: C. cowani

Binomial name
- Charaxes cowani Butler, 1878

= Charaxes cowani =

Species of butterfly

Charaxes cowani is a butterfly in the family Nymphalidae. It is found in eastern Madagascar. The habitat consists of montane forests at altitudes above 1,000 meters.

== Full description ==
A full description is given by Walter Rothschild and Karl Jordan, 1900 Novitates Zoologicae volume 7:287-524. page 370 (for terms see Novitates Zoologicae volume 5:545-601 )

== Taxonomy ==
Charaxes candiope group. The group members are:

- Charaxes candiope
- Charaxes antamboulou like next
- Charaxes cowani like last
- Charaxes velox
- Charaxes thomasius

== Etymology ==
Named for Rev William Deans Cowan, missionary author of Geographical Excursions in South Central Madagascar. Royal Geographical Society, London, 1882.
