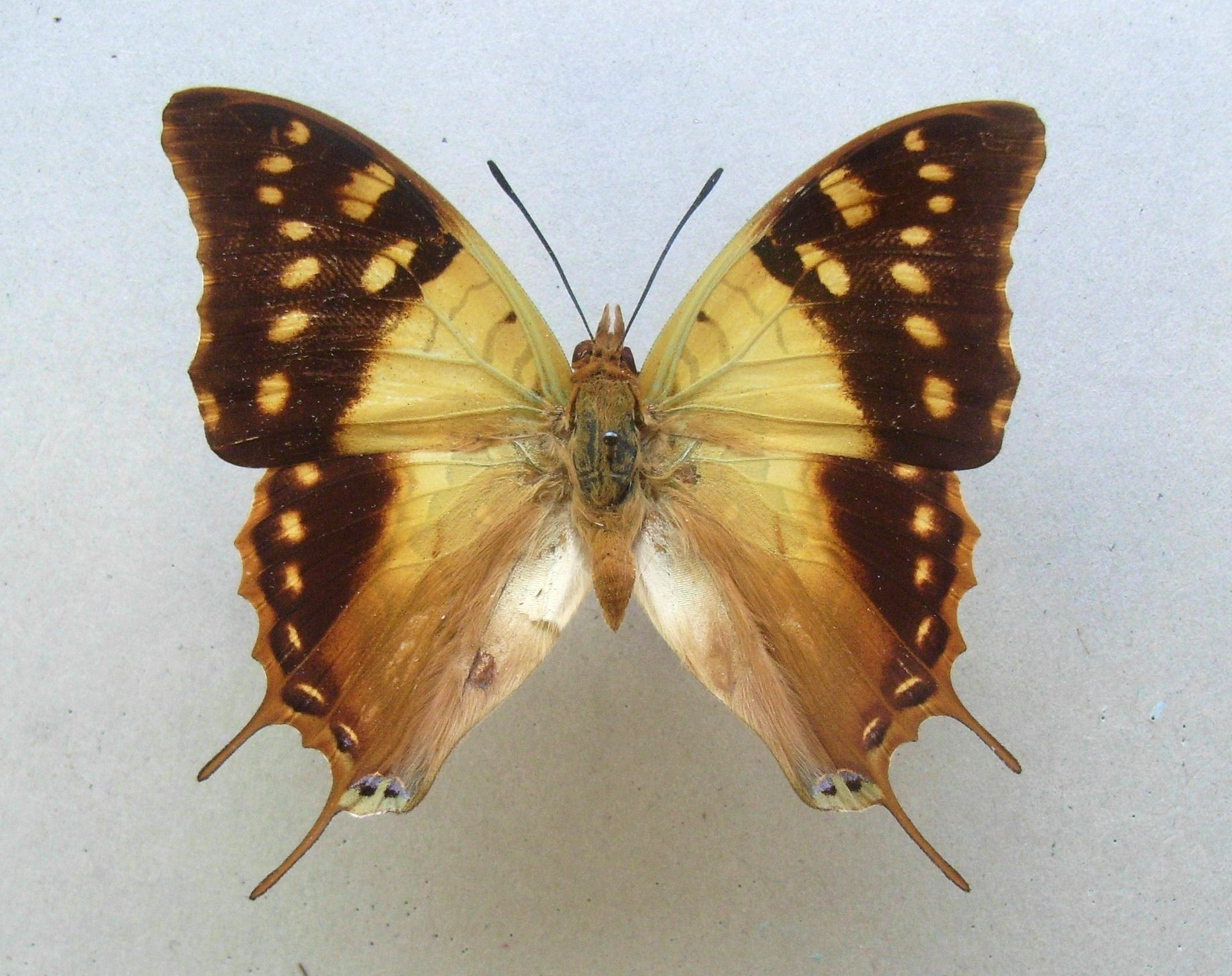
- C. a. meridionalis

Scientific classification
- Kingdom: Animalia
- Phylum: Arthropoda
- Class: Insecta
- Order: Lepidoptera
- Family: Nymphalidae
- Genus: Charaxes
- Species: C. antamboulou

Binomial name
- Charaxes antamboulou H. Lucas, 1872

Synonyms
- Charaxes antamboulou f. meridionalis Le Cerf, 1923

= Charaxes antamboulou =

Species of butterfly

Charaxes antamboulou, the Madagascar green-veined charaxes, is a butterfly of the family Nymphalidae. The species was first described by Hippolyte Lucas in 1872. It is found in Madagascar. The habitat consists of Afrotropical forests and woodland.

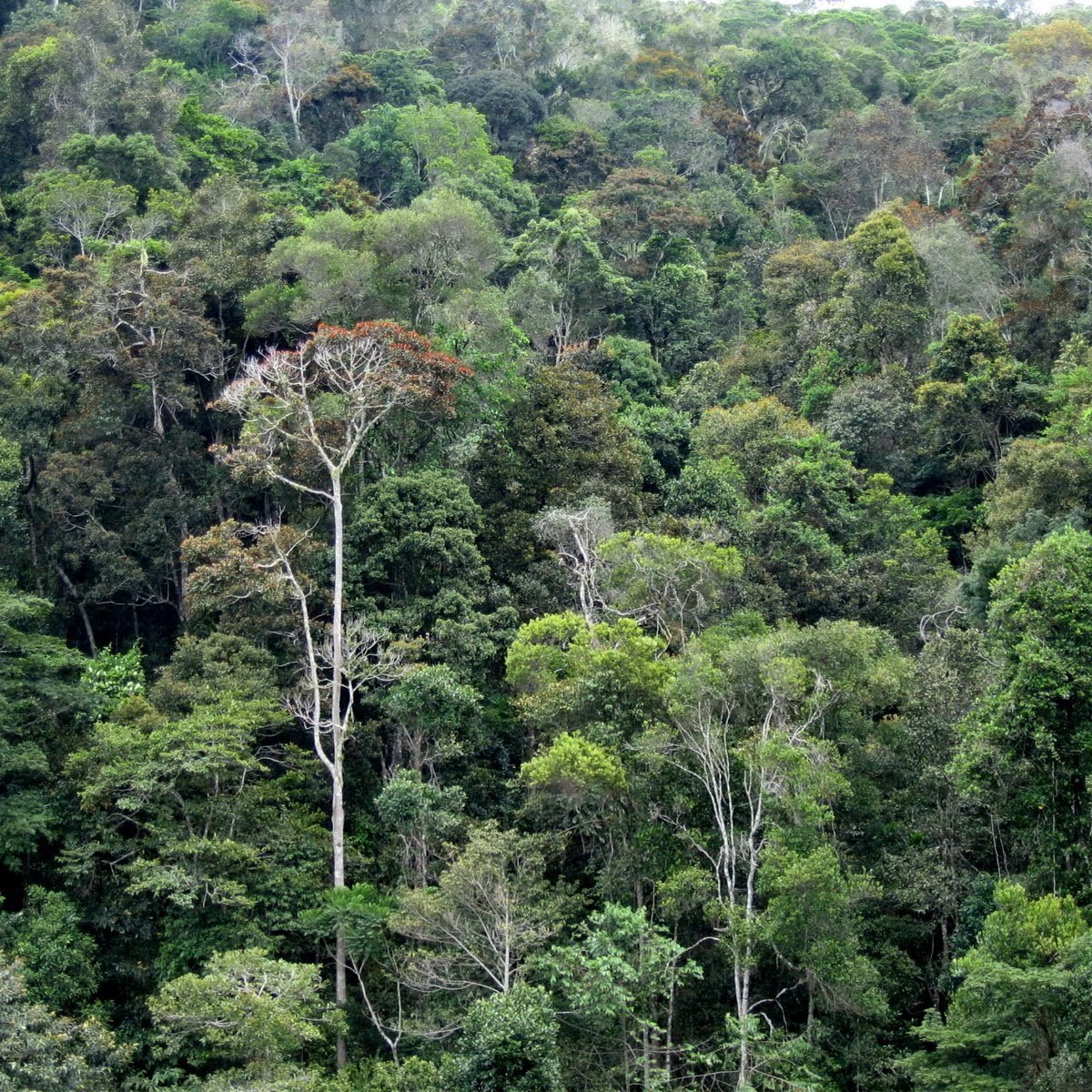
Primary forest in Madagascar

The larvae feed on Croton species.

== Description ==
Charaxes antamboulou is very similar to Charaxes candiope but has smaller upperside submarginal and marginal stains and a more marked contrast between the black apical patches and the yellow basal colour of the upperside wings.

A full description is given by Walter Rothschild and Karl Jordan, 1900 Novitates Zoologicae volume 7:287-524. page 368-369 (for terms see Novitates Zoologicae volume 5:545-601 )

== Taxonomy ==
Charaxes antamboulou is a member of the species group Charaxes candiope. The clade members are

- Charaxes candiope nominate
- Charaxes antamboulou
- Charaxes cowani
- Charaxes velox
- Charaxes thomasius

== Realm ==
Afrotropical realm

== See also ==
- Ecoregions of Madagascar
