= Beautiful frog =

Beautiful frog may refer to one of the following frog species:

- Beautiful mantella (Mantella pulchra), found in subtropical or tropical moist lowland forests, subtropical or tropical swamps, and swamps
- Beautiful nursery-frog (Cophixalus concinnus), found in Australia's montane rain forests
- Beautiful pygmy frog (Microhyla pulchra), a frog of the family Microhylidae found in Asia
