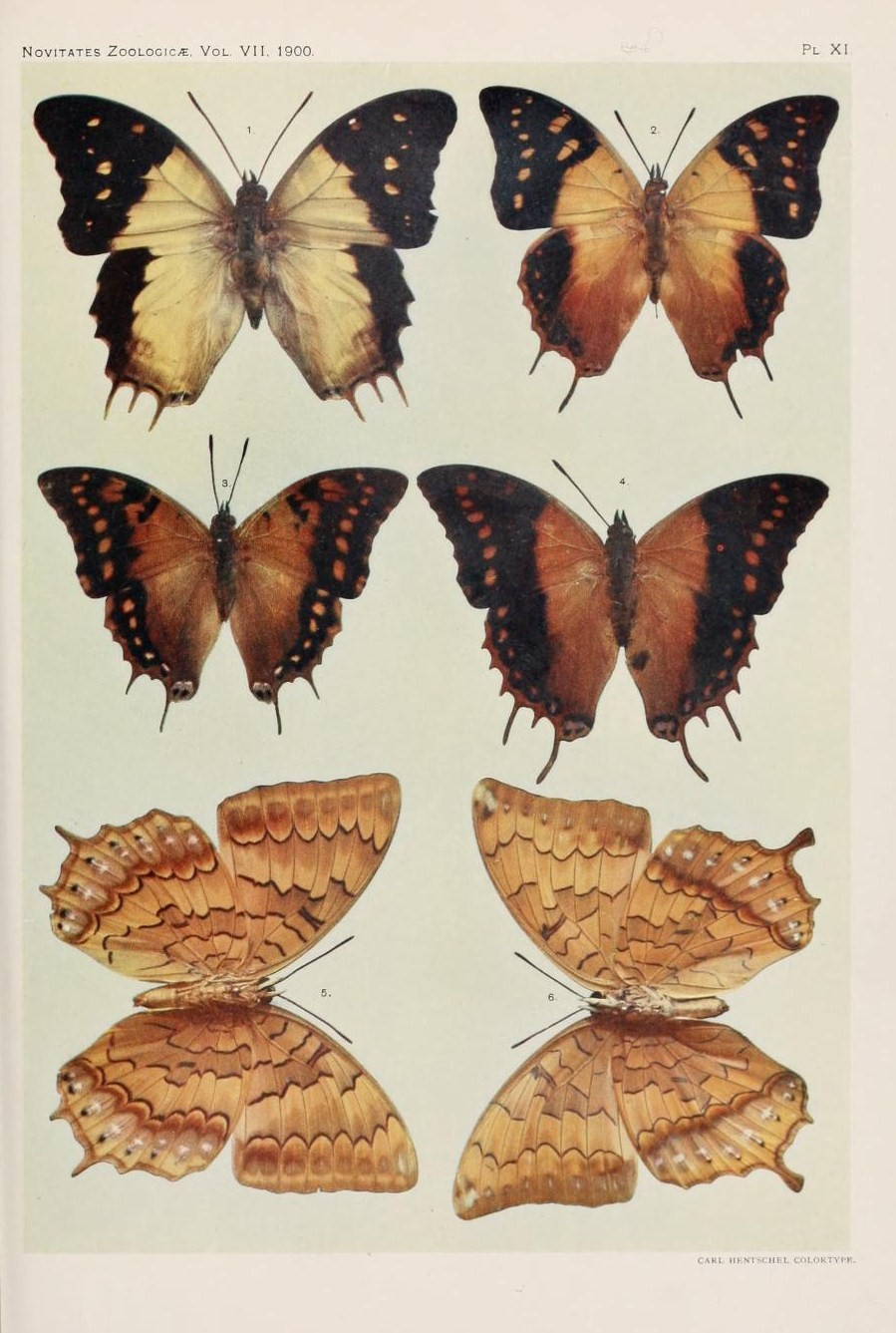
- Figure 3

Scientific classification
- Domain: Eukaryota
- Kingdom: Animalia
- Phylum: Arthropoda
- Class: Insecta
- Order: Lepidoptera
- Family: Nymphalidae
- Genus: Charaxes
- Species: C. velox

Binomial name
- Charaxes velox Ogilvie-Grant, 1899

= Charaxes velox =

Species of butterfly

Charaxes velox is a butterfly in the family Nymphalidae. It is found on Socotra, an island in the Arabian Sea.

== Description ==
A full description is given by Walter Rothschild and Karl Jordan, 1900 Novitates Zoologicae volume 7:287-524. page 368 for terms see volume 5:545-601

== Taxonomy ==
The species is sometimes treated as a subspecies of Charaxes candiope.

Charaxes candiope group. The group members are:

- Charaxes candiope
- Charaxes antamboulou - like next
- Charaxes cowani - like last
- Charaxes velox
- Charaxes thomasius
