= Mantella =

- Golden mantella (Mantella aurantiaca) from the Ramsar Menalamba site, Torotorofotsy Wetlands Reserve.

Scientific classification
- Kingdom: Animalia
- Phylum: Chordata
- Class: Amphibia
- Order: Anura
- Family: Mantellidae
- Subfamily: Mantellinae
- Genus: Mantella; Boulenger, 1882

Type species
- Dendrobates betsileo Grandidier, 1872

Diversity
- 16 species

Genus of amphibians

Mantella (also known as golden frogs or Malagasy poison frogs) are a prominent genus of aposematic frogs in the family Mantellidae, endemic to the island of Madagascar. Members of Mantella are diurnal and terrestrial, with bright aposematic coloration or cryptic markings.

== Natural history ==
Mantella are an example of convergent evolution—the independent evolution of a similar trait with species of a different lineage—with the Latin American family Dendrobatidae in size, appearance, and some behavioral characteristics. During the description of the first specimens from 1866 to 1872, Alfred Grandidier described both the brown mantella (Mantella betsileo) and Malagasy mantella (Mantella madagascariensis) and placed them within the genus Dendrobates based on their close resemblance.

This placement was heavily debated until 1882, when George Albert Boulenger created the genus Mantella after describing both Cowan's mantella (Mantella cowanii) and, in 1888, Baron's mantella (Mantella baroni). M. baroni was named after the gentleman that collected the specimens, Rev. Richard Baron, a missionary and botanist living in Madagascar. Baron was also interested in geology and herpetology, collecting many specimens during his extensive expeditions across the country. This species is incredibly similar in coloration to M. madagascariensis, except for the ventral/underside markings. In 1889, after the description of M. baroni, French naturalist Alexandre Thominot described Phrynomantis maculatus, with its type locality on Réunion Island. However, this locality was later corrected to the off-shore Malagasy islands of Nosy Bé and Nosy Komba and P. maculatus was synonymized with M. baroni.

The genus remained within Dendrobatidae until the late 19th century. The Royal Natural History (1893) by Richard Lydekker included the genus Mantella as one of two genera representing Dendrobatidae, saying that they could be "distinguished by the tip of the tongue being notched; while in Dendrobates of Tropical America the tongue is entire."

During the first quarter of the 20th century, another three species of Mantella were described, including the golden mantella (Mantella aurantiaca), by the French herpetologist François Mocquard in 1900. In his work "Synopsis des familles, genres et espèces des reptiles écailleux et des batraciens de Madagascar" published in 1909, Mocquard gave a detailed description of Mantella and the species within the genus. Within the document, six species are described, including one unusual description of Mantella attemsi, described in 1901 by Franz Josef Maria Werner, an Austrian zoologist and explorer. Mocquard's work describes M. attemsi as follows: "First digit extends as far as the second. [Replilatero-dorsal] present, starting at the rear of the upper eyelid. Skin very porous, slightly rough on the back and the head, stomach side smooth; lower back of the legs very rough. Back a dark red-brown, rest of the body black." This species was later synonymised with M. betsileo.

== Description ==
Species of this genus are small, varying in length between 18–31 millimetres (0.71–1.22 in). Most Mantella species are sexually dimorphic in size, with females being larger than males. Mantella vary in shape from streamlined to plump/rounded bodies, with skin that is either smooth or granular. They have small, angular heads, with large eyes that are either entirely dark or have lighter coloration around the edge of the iris. Mantella have a very distinct tympanum. The tips or discs of the fingers are slightly enlarged, though those of the climbing mantella (Mantella laevigata) are distinctly larger than in other members of the genus. They have four fingers on each forelimb and five on each hindlimb; some species have webbed digits, while others do not. The tibiotarsal articulation is roughly between the shoulder and the nostrils.

Many species of Mantella are similar to the neotropical family Dendrobatidae in their use of aposematism (from Greek ἀπό apo away, σῆμα sema sign), a defense mechanism that uses dramatic coloration to deter potential predators. Coloration and markings vary between species, with combinations of green, red, orange, yellow, blue, brown, white and black. These colorations are often evidence that the specimen produces toxic, pharmacologically active alkaloid secretions. There are significant similarities between a few species of Mantella and Dendrobatidae, notably the golden mantella (Mantella aurantiaca) and the golden poison frog (Phyllobates terribilis). Cowan's mantella (Mantella cowanii) and certain variations of the Harlequin poison frog (Oophaga histrionica) are also very similar in coloration. Most members of the genus also exhibit aposematism on the ventral region, excluding the golden mantella and black-eared mantella (Mantella milotympanum). The venter is normally uniform black, dark grey, or brown and are often marked with blueish or white spots, flecks, or blotches. There are similar blueish to white markings in the form of either spots or a continuous horseshoe-shaped marking on the vocal sac. These characteristics can be used to distinguish between species, such as Baron's mantella (Mantella baroni) and the Malagasy mantella (Mantella madagascariensis), when locality data is unavailable.

Mantella show a variety in alkaloid profiles between individual frogs of the Ranomafana region. These same alkaloids have been found to be sequestered by certain insects. It has also been observed that Mantella retain alkaloids in their skin for years in captivity. This, combined with analyses of stomach contents and diet, suggests that members of Mantella obtain at least some of their alkaloids from arthropod prey.

== Distribution ==
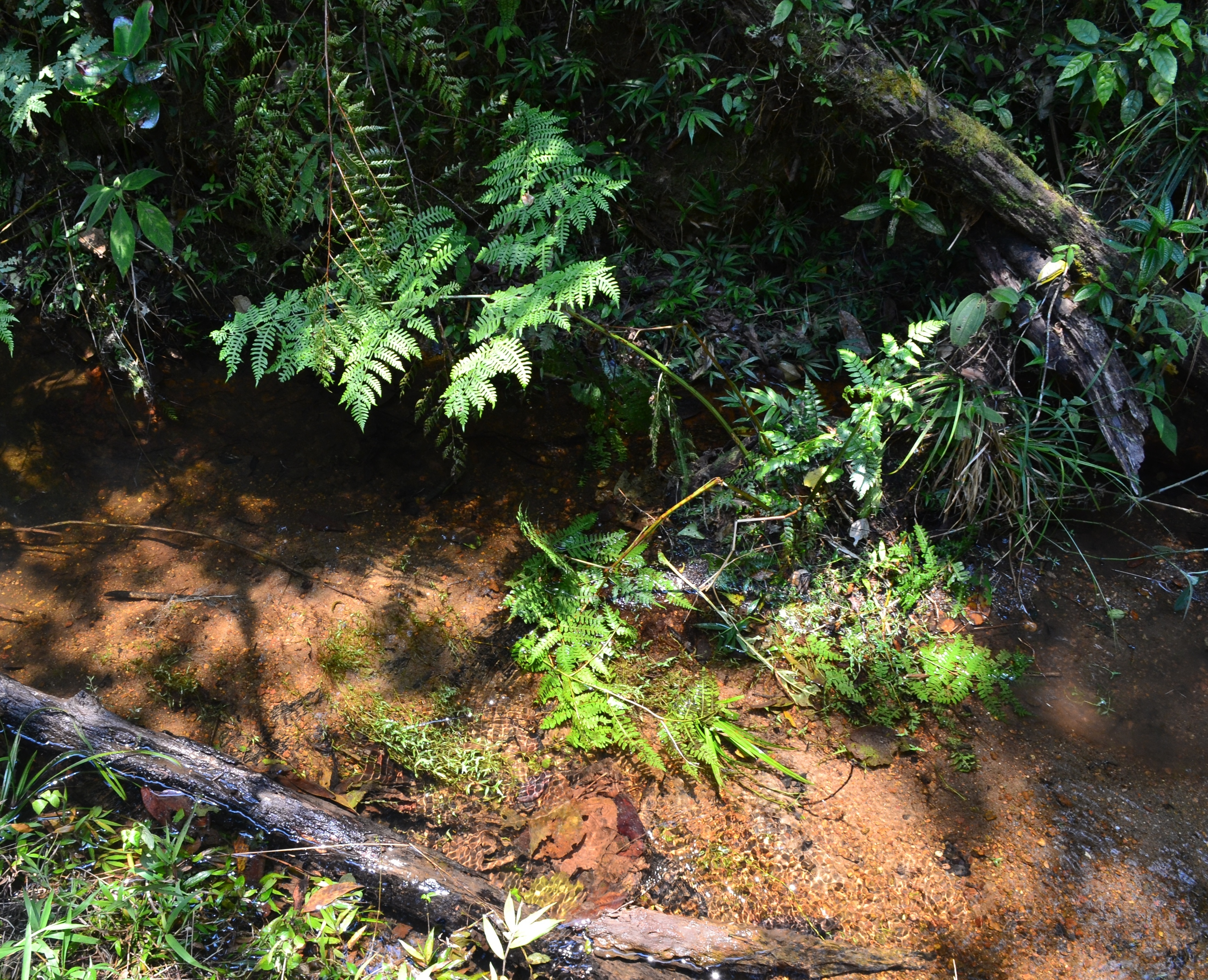
Habitat that beautiful mantella (Mantella pulchra) can be found around at Vohimana Experimental Reserve, Madagascar

Bronze variation of yellow mantella (Mantella crocea) at the Bakozetra locality, north of the Torotorofotsy Wetlands Reserve

Mantella are endemic to the island of Madagascar and its smaller coastal islands ("Nosy" in Malagasy). They inhabit a wide variety of different habitat types including primary rainforests, secondary rainforests, swamps, bamboo forests, semi-arid streambeds, slow moving forest streams, seasonal streams, montane grassland savannah, and wet canyons.

Some members of the genus such as Ebenau's mantella (Mantella ebenaui), the brown mantella (Mantella betsileo), and Cowan's mantella (Mantella cowanii) are highly adaptable and have been reported in a wide variety of habitats. On the island of Nosy Boraha (Sainte Marie), M. ebenaui have been found living in garbage dumps, feeding on flies. Similar behavior has been reported in western Madagascar, with M. betsileo inhabiting rubbish piles behind human dwellings.

=== Locality variations ===
There are several populations of Mantella species that exhibit unusual coloration, some of which are intermediates between species living in sympatry. For example, there are populations of yellow mantella (Mantella crocea) and black-eared mantella (Mantella milotympanum) found in Fierenana, Andriabe, Ambohitantely Reserve and Savakoanina that have green, red and yellow colourations. This often makes it difficult to distinguish between the two species.

Populations of Baron's mantella (Mantella baroni) have also been reported at Pic d'Ivohibe Reserve, being almost entirely green in coloration with black patches and spotting, and lacking their distinctive orange and irregular black crossbands. These specimens are referred to as Mantella aff. baroni.

Malagasy mantella (Mantella madagascariensis), a species similar in appearance to M. baroni, is also notably variable among different localities. Niagarakely is one such locality within the Anosibe An'ala District of the Alaotra-Mangoro Region. Here, M. madagascariensis exhibit highly broken yellow/green and mottled black dorsal coloration.

== Species ==
There are currently 16 species of Mantella, with five recognized species groups. Most species are easily identifiable by their color patterns, although there are a number of locality variations with an uncertain taxonomic status.

Species group	Image	Binomial (scientific name)	Common name	IUCN conservation status	Distribution
Mantella laevigata group		Mantella laevigata Methuen & Hewitt, 1913	Climbing mantella	Least Concern	northeastern Madagascar
Mantella laevigata group		Mantella manery Vences, Glaw & Böhme, 1999	Marojejy mantella	Vulnerable	northern Madagascar
Mantella betsileo group		Mantella betsileo Grandidier, 1872	Brown mantella	Least Concern	western & central Madagascar
Mantella betsileo group		Mantella ebenaui Boettger, 1880	Ebenau's mantella	Least Concern	northeastern Madagascar
Mantella betsileo group		Mantella expectata Busse & Böhme, 1992	Blue-legged mantella	Endangered	southwestern Madagascar
Mantella betsileo group		Mantella viridis Pintak & Böhme, 1988	Green mantella	Endangered	northern Madagascar
Mantella bernhardi group		Mantella bernhardi Vences, Glaw, Peyrieras, Böhme & Busse, 1994	Bernhard's mantella	Vulnerable	southeastern Madagascar
Mantella cowanii group		Mantella cowanii Boulenger, 1882	Cowan's or harlequin mantella	Endangered	central Madagascar
Mantella cowanii group		Mantella baroni Boulenger, 1888	Baron's mantella	Least Concern	central Madagascar
Mantella cowanii group		Mantella haraldmeieri Busse, 1981	Harald Meier's mantella	Endangered	southern Madagascar
Mantella cowanii group		Mantella nigricans Guibé, 1978	Guibe's mantella	Least Concern	northeastern Madagascar
Mantella aurantiaca group		Mantella aurantiaca Mocquard, 1900	Golden mantella	Endangered	central Madagascar
Mantella aurantiaca group		Mantella crocea Pintak & Böhme, 1990	Yellow mantella	Vulnerable	central Madagascar
Mantella aurantiaca group		Mantella madagascariensis Grandidier, 1872	Malagasy mantella	Vulnerable	central Madagascar
Mantella aurantiaca group		Mantella milotympanum Staniszewski, 1996	Black-eared mantella	Critically Endangered	eastern Madagascar
Mantella aurantiaca group		Mantella pulchra Parker, 1925	Beautiful mantella	Near Threatened	eastern Madagascar

== Threats ==
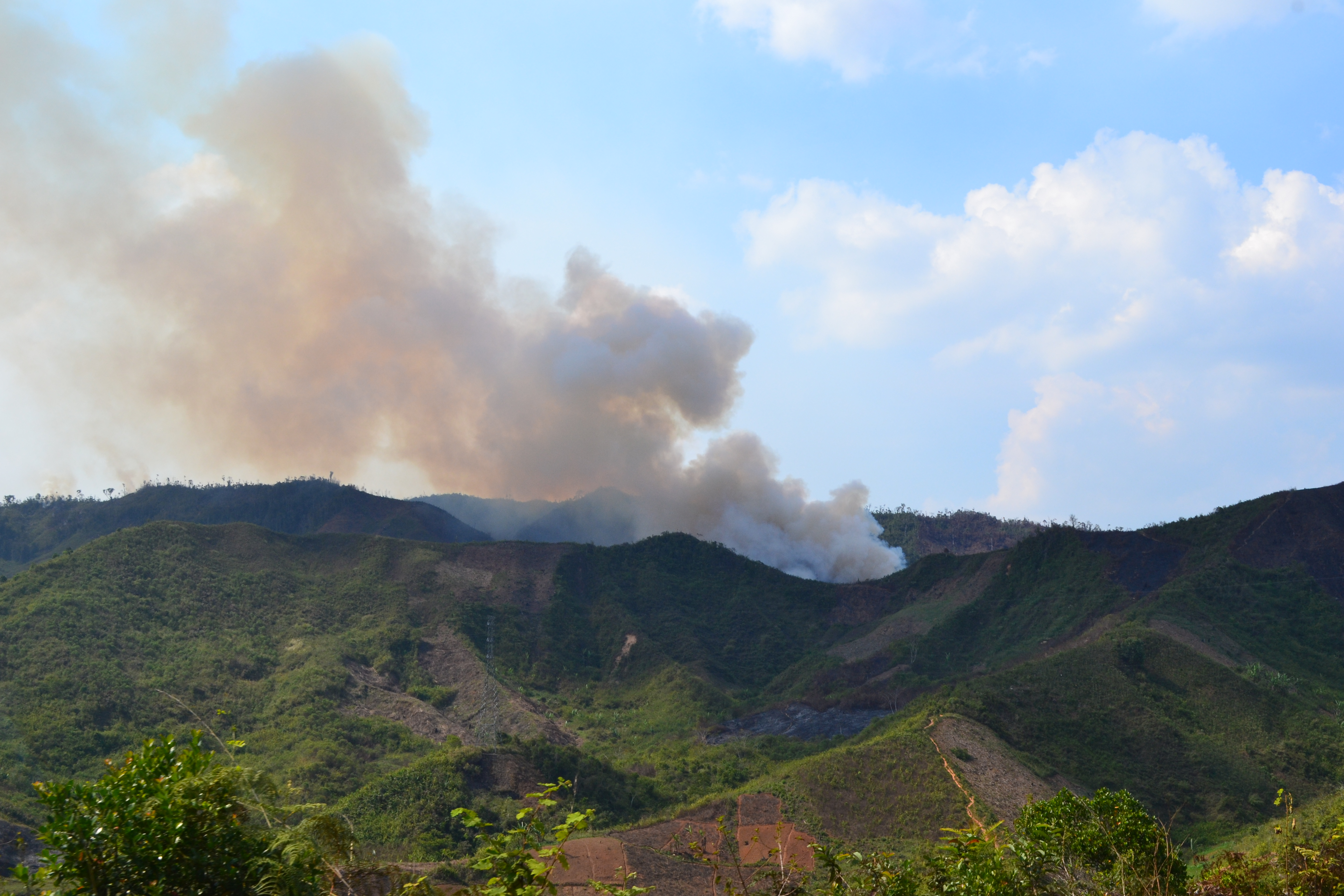
Slash-and-burn farming method (known locally as tavy) being used near the Vohimana Experimental Reserve, Madagascar.

Several species in the genus are threatened because of habitat loss (due to subsistence agriculture, timber extraction and charcoal production, fires, draining of wetlands, the spread of invasive eucalyptus, and expanding human settlements), mining, hybridization and over-collection for the international pet trade. As a result of these threats, various Mantella sp. are listed as least concern, near threatened, vulnerable, endangered, and critically endangered by the IUCN Red List of Threatened Species.

Species in this genus have tested positive for Batrachochytrium dendrobatidis (Bd). As of yet, there have been no negative effects observed within amphibian populations in Madagascar, suggesting that the Bd strain has a low virulence level but should be closely monitored.

== Gallery ==
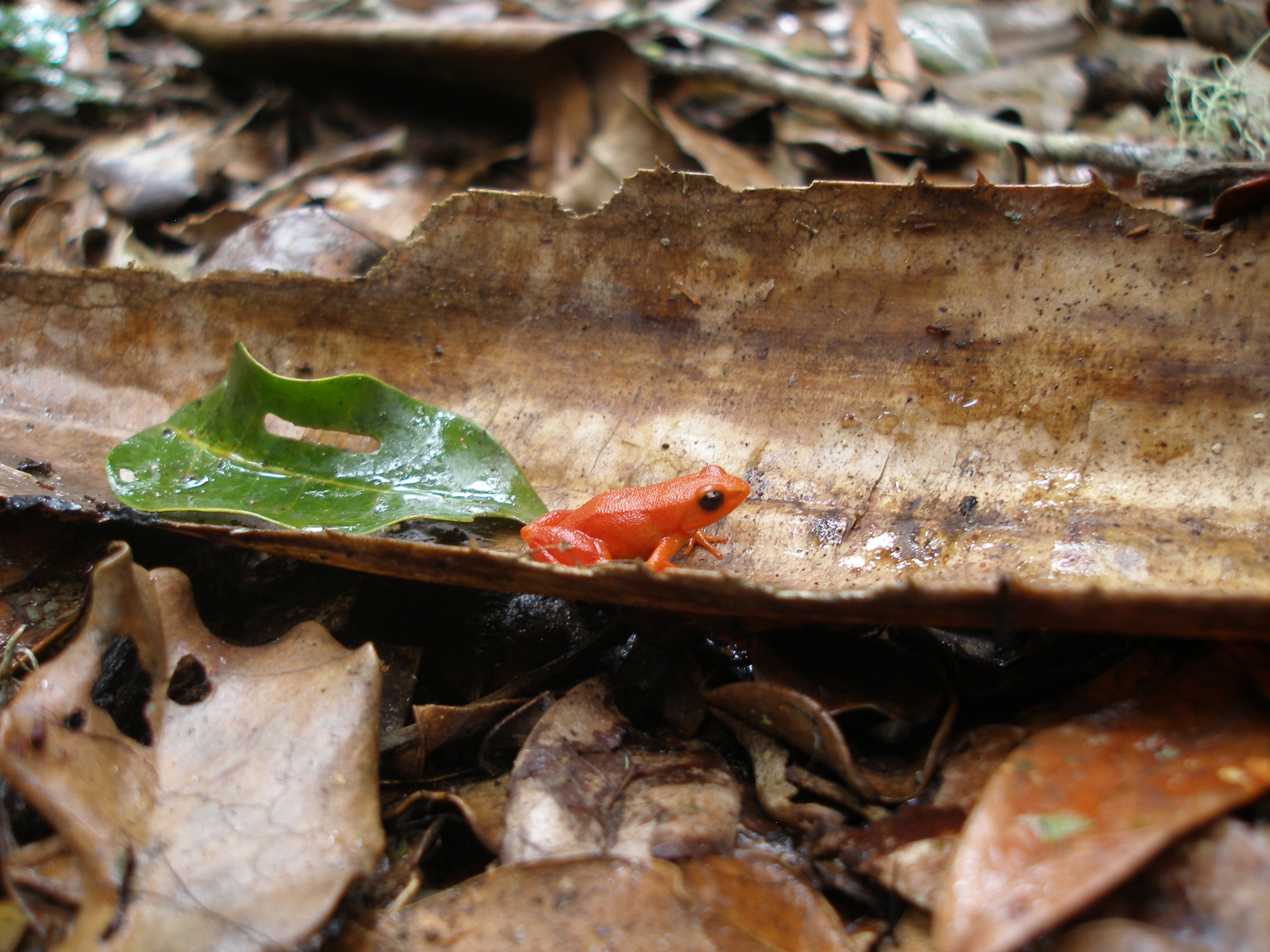
Mantella aurantiaca

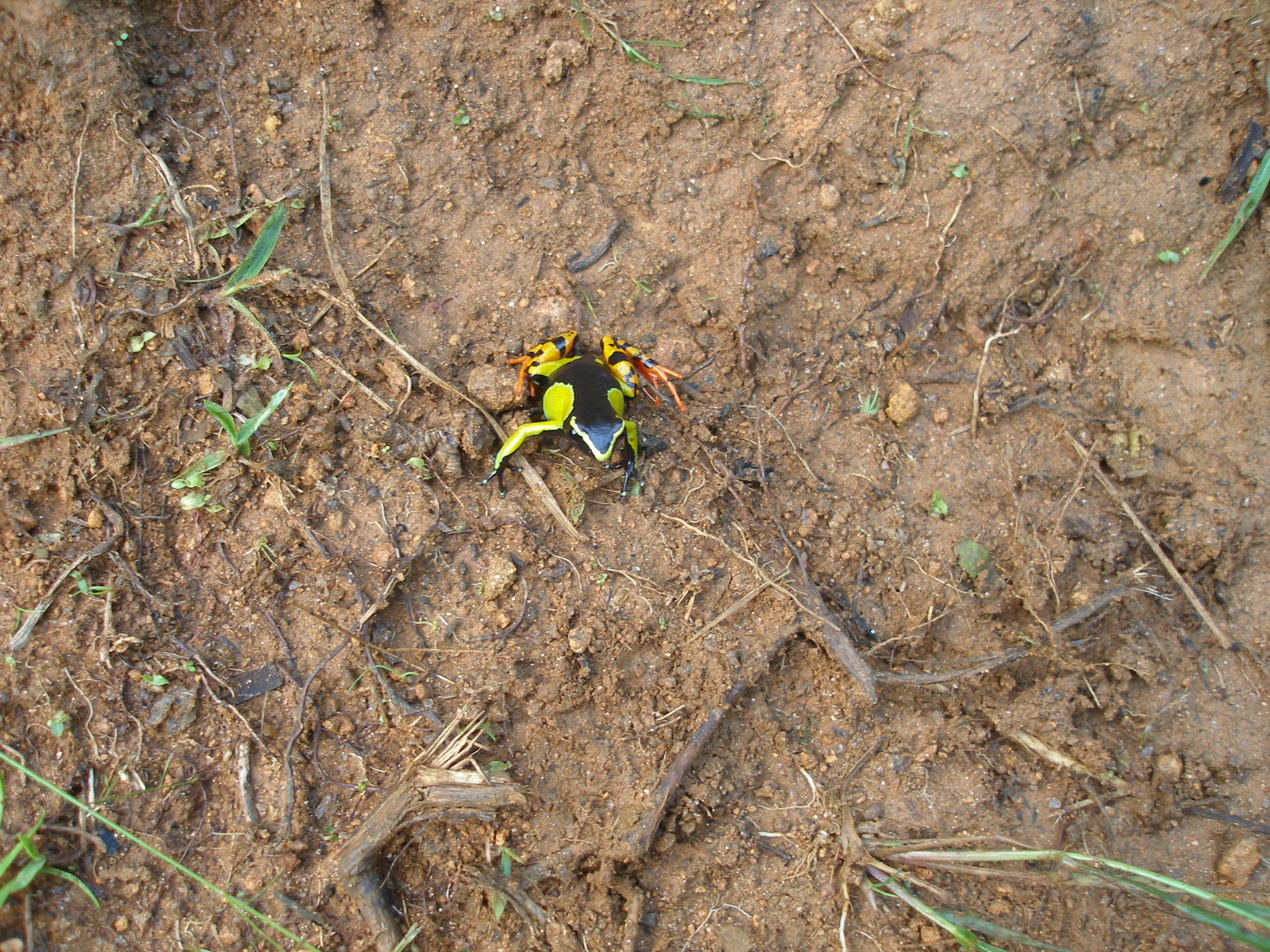
Mantella baroni

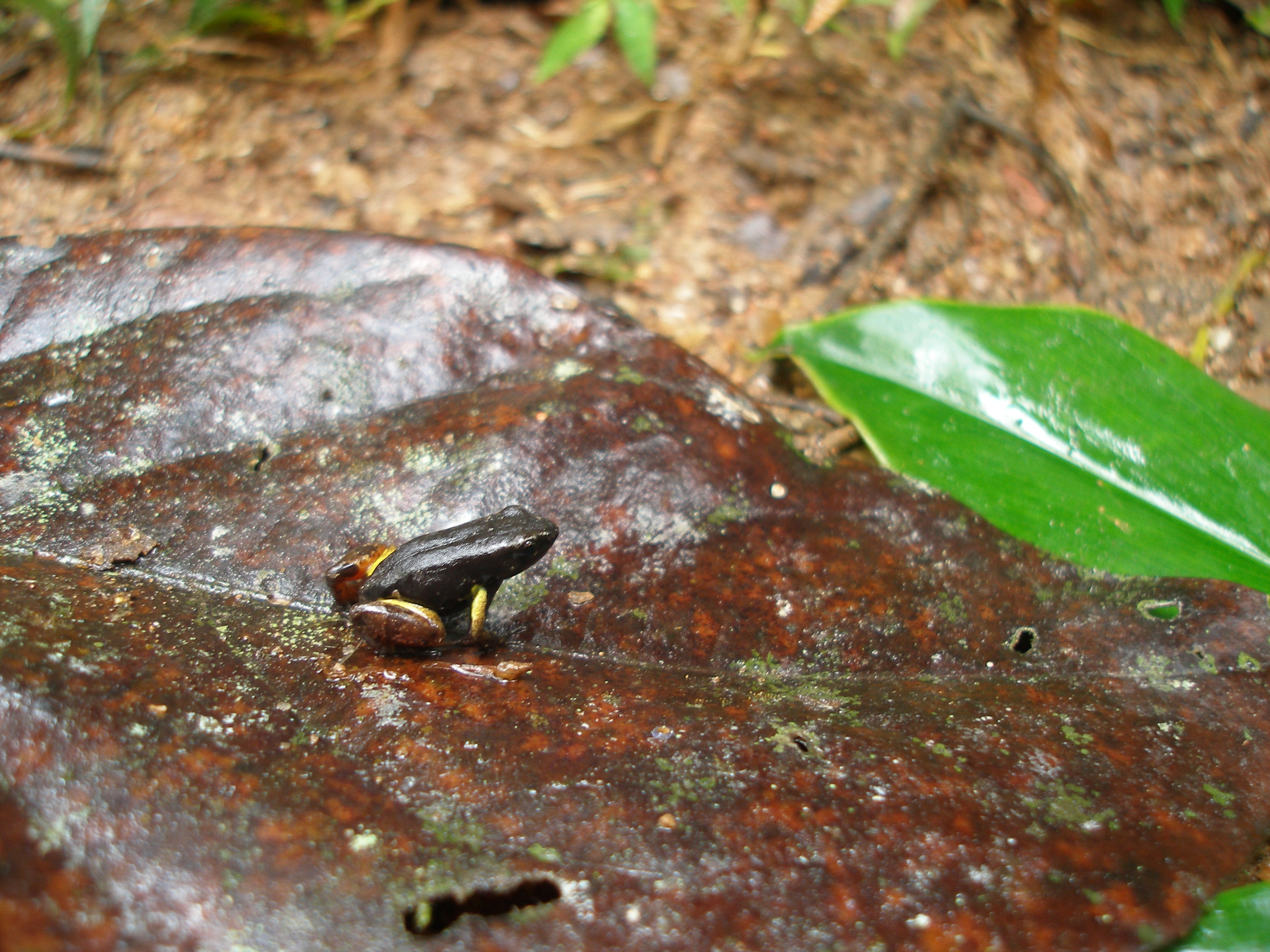
Mantella bernhardi

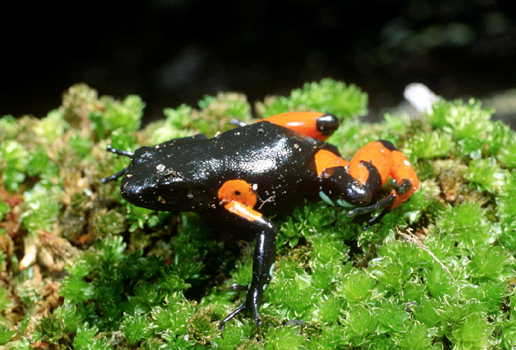
Mantella cowanii

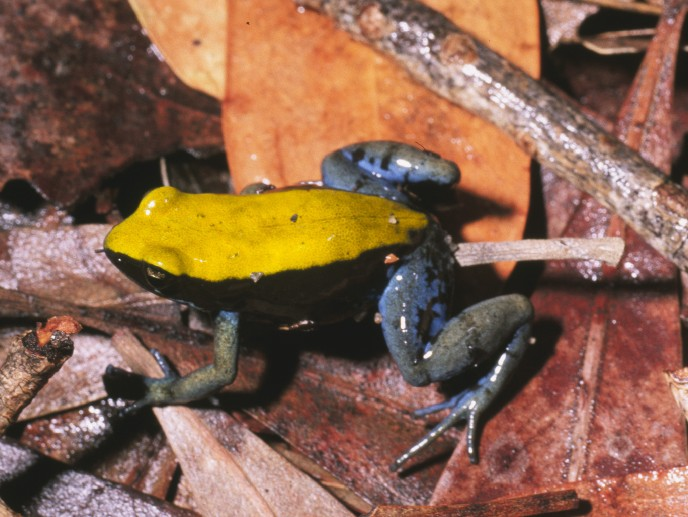
Mantella expectata
