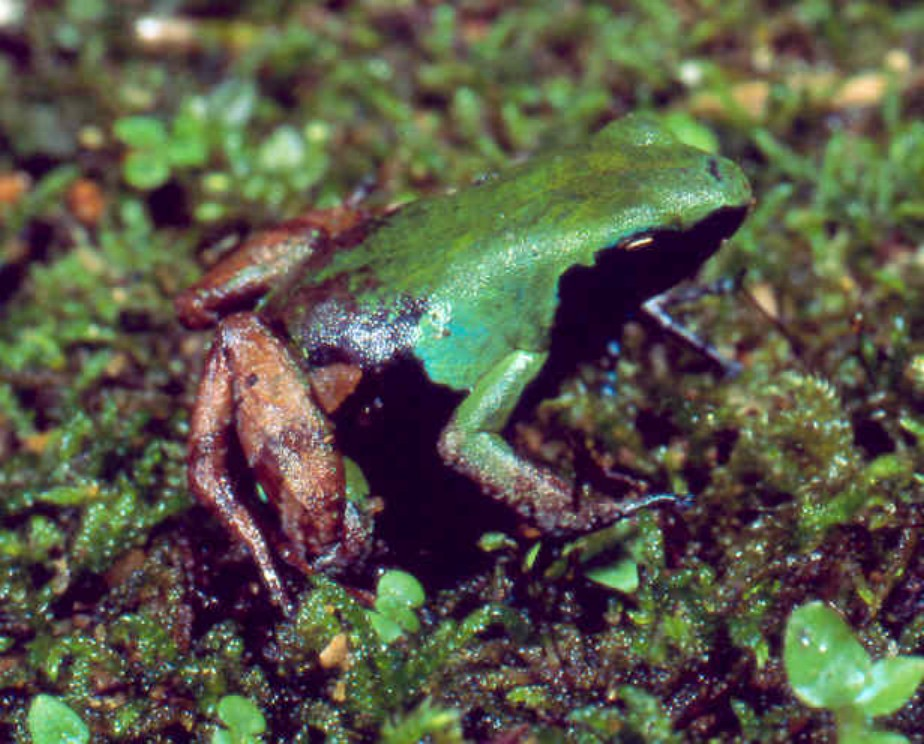

Conservation status
- Least Concern (IUCN 3.1)

Scientific classification
- Kingdom: Animalia
- Phylum: Chordata
- Class: Amphibia
- Order: Anura
- Family: Mantellidae
- Genus: Mantella
- Species: M. nigricans

Binomial name
- Mantella nigricans Guibé, 1978

= Guibé's mantella =

Guibé's Mantella

Species of frog

The Guibé's Mantella (Mantella nigricans) is a species of frog in the family Mantellidae. It is endemic to Madagascar. Its natural habitats are subtropical or tropical moist lowland forests and rivers. It is threatened by habitat loss.
