= Charaxes candiope =

Green-veined emperor
- in Tanzania

Conservation status
- Least Concern (IUCN 3.1)

Scientific classification
- Kingdom: Animalia
- Phylum: Arthropoda
- Clade: Pancrustacea
- Class: Insecta
- Order: Lepidoptera
- Family: Nymphalidae
- Genus: Charaxes
- Species: C. candiope

Binomial name
- Charaxes candiope (Godart, 1824)

Synonyms
- Nymphalis candiope Godart, 1824; Charaxes viridicostatus Aurivillius, 1879; Charaxes candiope f. uniformis Storace, 1948; Charaxes candiope uniformis ab. rosae Storace, 1948

Species of butterfly

Charaxes candiope, the green-veined emperor or green-veined charaxes, is a butterfly of the family Nymphalidae. It is common in sub-Saharan Africa.

== Biology ==
The habitat is forest and savanna excluding arid savanna. It also occurs in gardens and agricultural areas. Notes on the biology of candiope are given by Pringle et al. (1994), Larsen, T.B. (1991), Larsen, T.B. (2005) and Kielland, J. (1990). Flight period is from October to June.

== Description ==
The wingspan is 45–55 mm in males and 50–60 mm in females. The basic colour of the upperside wings is tawny or orange tawny, with a basal area slightly paler or pale ochre yellow. The unscaled veins and the costal edge of forewing are green. The hindwings have a submarginal black band with a series of tawny ochreous or whitish interstitial spots. The undersides of the forewings are clayish, slightly ochreous, while the hindwings are sepia colour. Forewings are rather falcate, while the hindwings have two small tails protruding from the lower edge.

== Full description ==
A full description is given by Walter Rothschild and Karl Jordan, 1900 Novitates Zoologicae volume 7:287-524. page 364 et seq. (for terms see Novitates Zoologicae volume 5:545-601 )

== Life history ==
Larvae have large green bodies and heads decorated with horns. They feed on Croton sylvaticus, Croton gratissimus, and Croton megalocarpus.

== Distribution ==
This species can be found in most of the Afrotropical realm (Sub-Saharan Africa).

== Taxonomy ==
Charaxes candiope group. The group members are:

- Charaxes candiope
- Charaxes antamboulou like next
- Charaxes cowani like last
- Charaxes velox
- Charaxes thomasius
