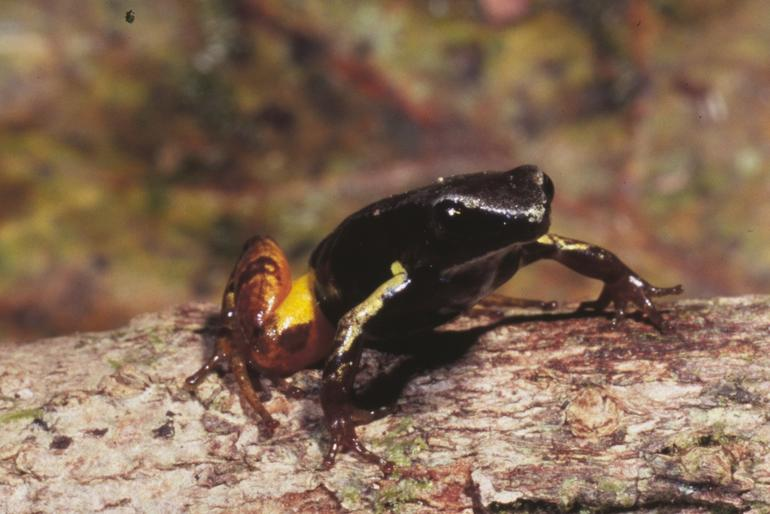

Conservation status
- Vulnerable (IUCN 3.1)

Scientific classification
- Kingdom: Animalia
- Phylum: Chordata
- Class: Amphibia
- Order: Anura
- Family: Mantellidae
- Genus: Mantella
- Species: M. bernhardi

Binomial name
- Mantella bernhardi Vences, Glaw, Peyrieras, Böhme & Busse, 1994

= Bernhard's mantella =

Species of frog

The Bernhard's mantella (Mantella bernhardi) is a species of frog in the family Mantellidae. It is endemic to Madagascar. Its natural habitats are subtropical or tropical moist lowland forests, rivers, swamps, and heavily degraded former forest. It is threatened by habitat loss. Collection for the pet trade is strictly limited, as it could pose a threat to the species.
