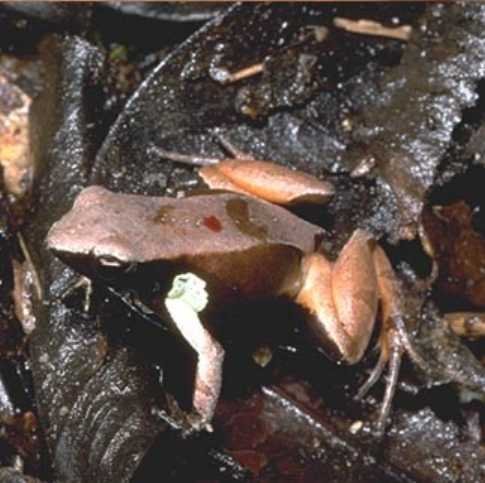

Conservation status
- Endangered (IUCN 3.1)

Scientific classification
- Kingdom: Animalia
- Phylum: Chordata
- Class: Amphibia
- Order: Anura
- Family: Mantellidae
- Genus: Mantella
- Species: M. haraldmeieri

Binomial name
- Mantella haraldmeieri Busse, 1981

= Haraldmeier's mantella =

Haraldmeier's Mantella

Species of frog

The Haraldmeier's mantella (Mantella haraldmeieri) is a species of frog in the family Mantellidae. It is endemic to Madagascar. Its natural habitats are subtropical or tropical moist lowland forests and rivers. It is threatened by habitat loss.
