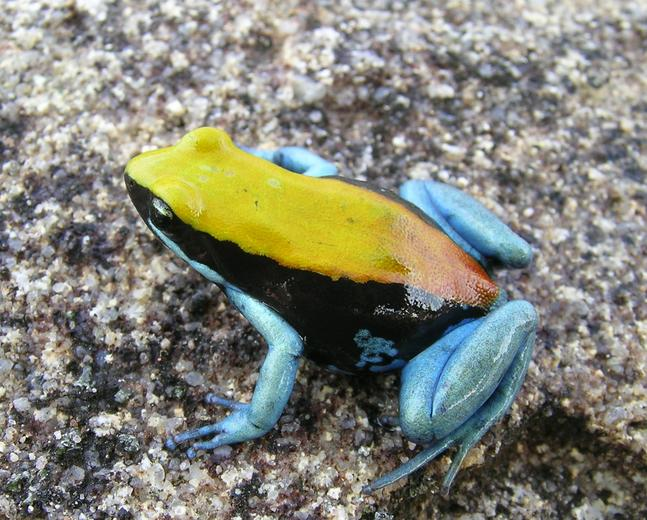

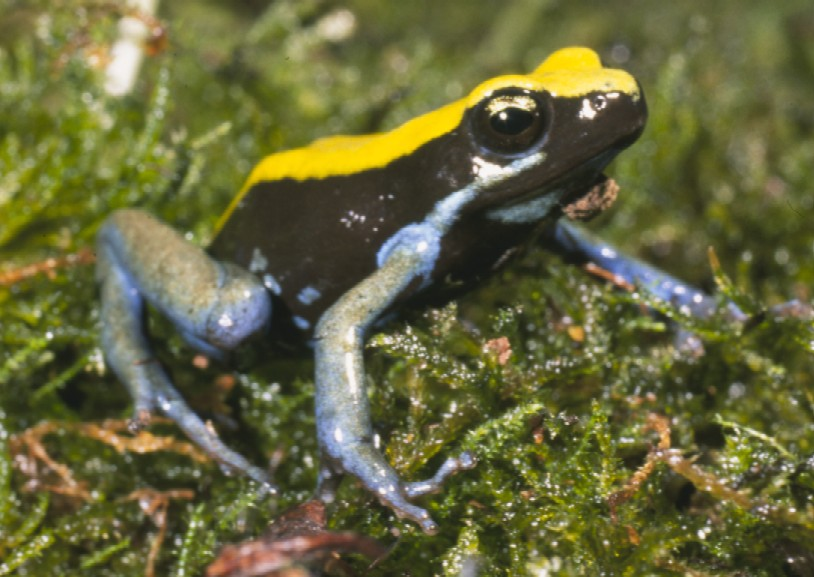

Conservation status
- Endangered (IUCN 3.1)

Scientific classification
- Kingdom: Animalia
- Phylum: Chordata
- Class: Amphibia
- Order: Anura
- Family: Mantellidae
- Genus: Mantella
- Species: M. expectata

Binomial name
- Mantella expectata Busse & Böhme, 1992

= Blue-legged mantella =

Species of amphibian

The blue-legged mantella (Mantella expectata) is a small species of frog in the family Mantellidae. It is endemic to the Isalo National Park and areas south of it in Madagascar, a range it shares with the rainbow frog (Scaphiophryne gottlebei). Both are locally common, but endangered due to habitat loss and over-collected for the pet trade.

== Habitat and behavior ==
The blue-legged mantella is diurnal and belongs to the M. betsileo species group. Its preferred habitats are sun-exposed such as temporary rocky streams and inside rocky canyons. Their reproduction season is from September to December. The eggs are either hung on the walls of canyons or laid under rocks. They are then flooded by water and complete their development in temporary pools. It is a quite short-lived species with a typical maximum age of 3 years.

== Appearance ==
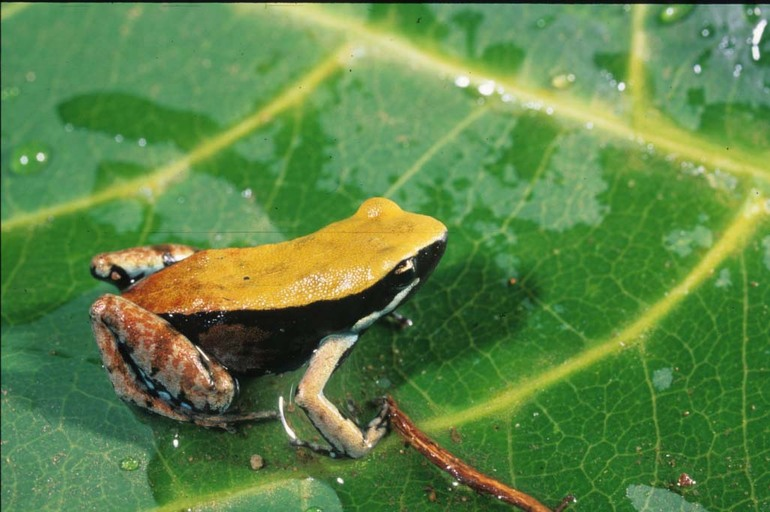
The so-called "desert mantella", a likely undescribed species that is closely related to the blue-legged mantella

The blue-legged mantella has a snout–to–vent length of 2–3 cm (0.8–1.2 in). It is quite distinctive with aposematic colours, a warning of the alkaloid toxins in its skin. The back and top of the head are yellow, contrasted by blue legs, and black flanks and sides of the head. The underside is black with blue spots. There are individual and locality based variations, with some having darker and greyer legs or, in the far north of its range, a reddish lower back (contrasting with the yellow upper back and top of head). Those with a red lower back and grey legs have sometimes been called the "blushing mantella" or "sunrise mantella". In the south of the species' range, individuals commonly have some brown to the legs, approaching the appearance of the brown mantella (M. betsileo), and some are genetically in between the two species, but their taxonomic position is still unresolved. This intermediate population is sometimes referred to as M. cf. expectata, whereas the so-called "desert mantella", a likely undescribed species from arid habitats in southernmost and western Madagascar that is closely related to the blue-legged mantella, sometimes has been referred to as M. aff. expectata. Sex in the blue-legged mantella can be determined by the size of the body (females averaging noticeably larger than males), a horseshoe-shaped blue spot located on the lower jaw in males, and by the vocal signals that are specifically emitted only by males.
