= Marojejy mantella =

Conservation status
- Vulnerable (IUCN 3.1)

Scientific classification
- Kingdom: Animalia
- Phylum: Chordata
- Class: Amphibia
- Order: Anura
- Family: Mantellidae
- Genus: Mantella
- Species: M. manery

Binomial name
- Mantella manery Vences, Glaw & Böhme, 1999

Species of frog

The Marojejy mantella (Mantella manery) is a species of frog in the family Mantellidae. It is endemic to Madagascar. Its natural habitats are subtropical or tropical moist lowland forests, rivers, swamps, and intermittent freshwater marshes. It is threatened by habitat loss.
