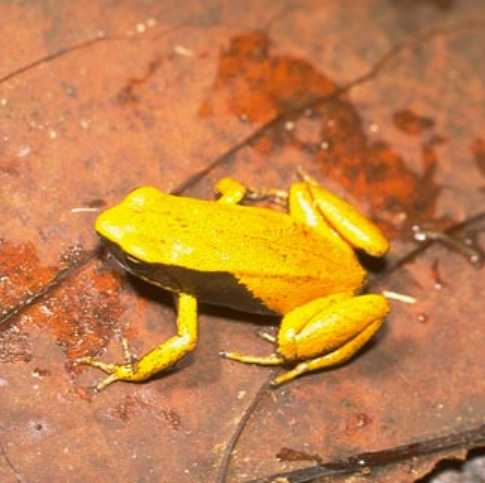

Conservation status
- Vulnerable (IUCN 3.1)

Scientific classification
- Kingdom: Animalia
- Phylum: Chordata
- Class: Amphibia
- Order: Anura
- Family: Mantellidae
- Genus: Mantella
- Species: M. crocea

Binomial name
- Mantella crocea Pintak & Böhme, 1990

= Yellow mantella =

Species of frog

The yellow mantella or eastern mantella (Mantella crocea) is a species of frog in the family Mantellidae. It is endemic to Madagascar. Its natural habitats are subtropical or tropical moist lowland forests, subtropical or tropical swamps, and swamps. It is threatened by habitat loss. Commercial collection may also be a threat.
