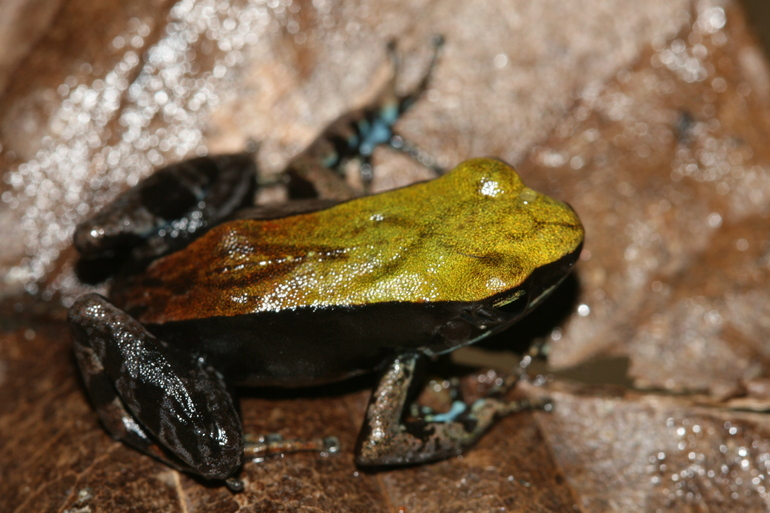

Conservation status
- Least Concern (IUCN 3.1)

Scientific classification
- Kingdom: Animalia
- Phylum: Chordata
- Class: Amphibia
- Order: Anura
- Family: Mantellidae
- Genus: Mantella
- Species: M. ebenaui

Binomial name
- Mantella ebenaui (Boettger, 1880)

= Mantella ebenaui =

Yellow ebenaui

Species of frog

Mantella ebenaui is a species of frog in the family Mantellidae. It is endemic to northern Madagascar with one of the largest ranges of any Mantella. Its natural habitats are rainforest and dry forests. Mantella ebenaui lay their eggs on land near the water. These eggs hatch into larvae which develop in small ponds before reaching maturity.
