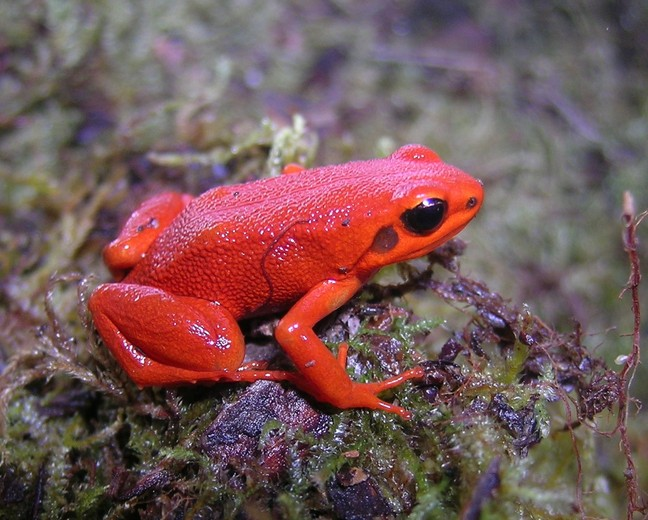

Conservation status
- Critically Endangered (IUCN 3.1)

Scientific classification
- Kingdom: Animalia
- Phylum: Chordata
- Class: Amphibia
- Order: Anura
- Family: Mantellidae
- Genus: Mantella
- Species: M. milotympanum

Binomial name
- Mantella milotympanum Staniszewski, 1996

= Black-eared mantella =

Black-eared Mantella

Species of frog

The black-eared mantella (Mantella milotympanum) is a species of frog in the family Mantellidae. It is endemic to Madagascar. Its natural habitats are subtropical or tropical moist lowland forests, subtropical or tropical swamps, subtropical or tropical moist montane forests, and swamps. It is threatened by habitat loss. None of its habitat is currently protected (2017).

It is kept as a pet; in the past, it has been collected in large numbers, and the pet trade may be a major threat to the species.
