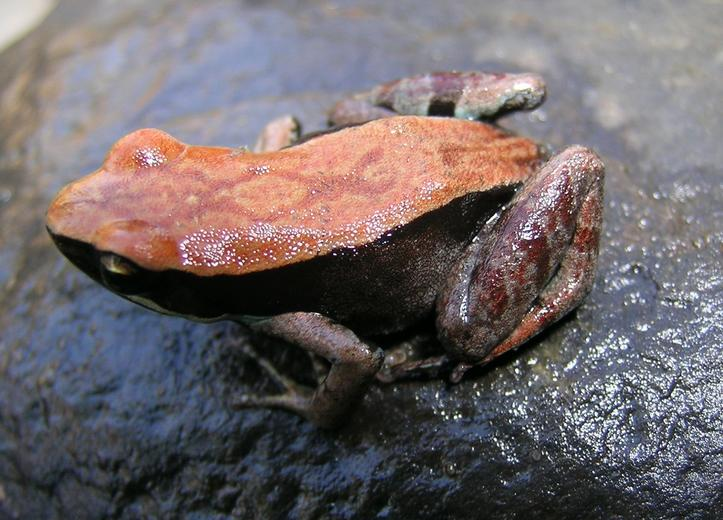

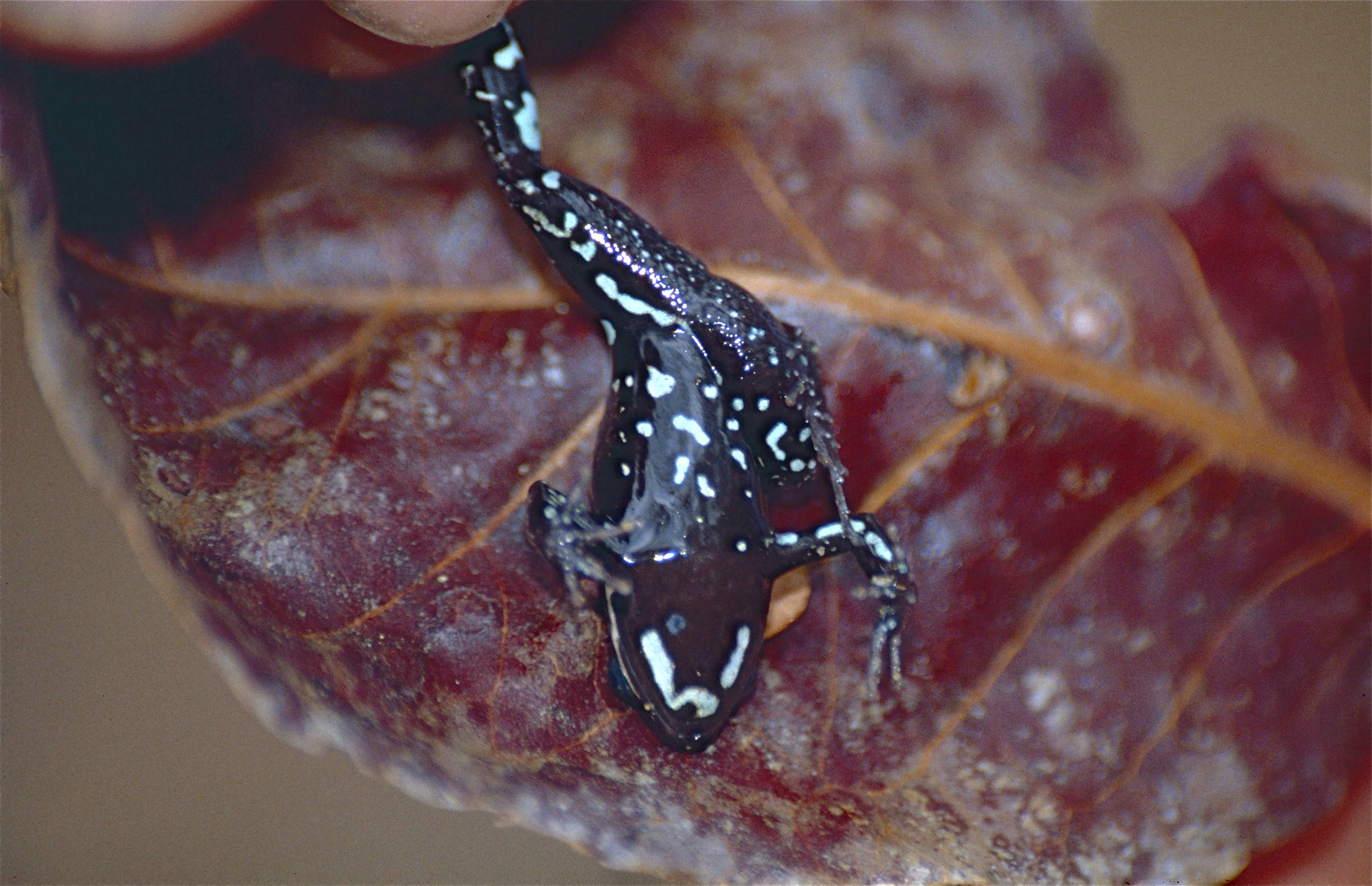
- Individuals showing the dull upperside (above) and the conspicuously marked underparts (below)

Conservation status
- Least Concern (IUCN 3.1)

Scientific classification
- Kingdom: Animalia
- Phylum: Chordata
- Class: Amphibia
- Order: Anura
- Family: Mantellidae
- Genus: Mantella
- Species: M. betsileo

Binomial name
- Mantella betsileo (Grandidier, 1872)

= Brown mantella =

Species of frog

The brown mantella (Mantella betsileo) is a species of frog in the family Mantellidae. It is endemic to Madagascar. Its natural habitats are subtropical or tropical dry forests, dry savanna, moist savanna, subtropical or tropical dry shrubland, rivers, freshwater marshes, intermittent freshwater marshes, rural gardens, heavily degraded former forest, ponds, and canals and ditches. It is threatened by habitat loss.
