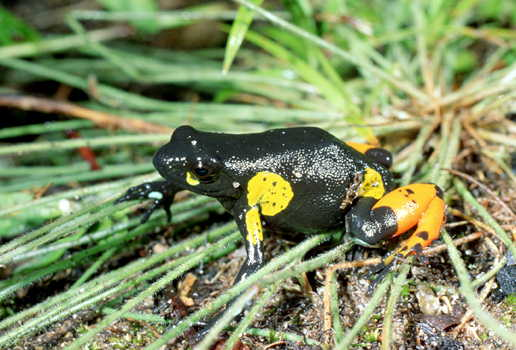

Conservation status
- Endangered (IUCN 3.1)

Scientific classification
- Kingdom: Animalia
- Phylum: Chordata
- Class: Amphibia
- Order: Anura
- Family: Mantellidae
- Genus: Mantella
- Species: M. cowanii

Binomial name
- Mantella cowanii Boulenger, 1882

= Cowan's mantella =

Species of frog

The Cowan's mantella (Mantella cowanii) is a species of frog in the family Mantellidae. It is endemic to Madagascar. Its natural habitats are subtropical or tropical moist montane forests, subtropical or tropical high-altitude grassland, and rivers. It is threatened by habitat loss. Collection for the pet trade has also been a threat.
