= Richard Baron (botanist) =

The Reverend Richard Baron
- Born: 8 September 1847; Kendal, England
- Died: 12 October 1907 (aged 60); Morecambe, England
- Education: Lancashire College, Chorley, Lancashire
- Scientific career
- Fields: Botany; Geology; Herpetology

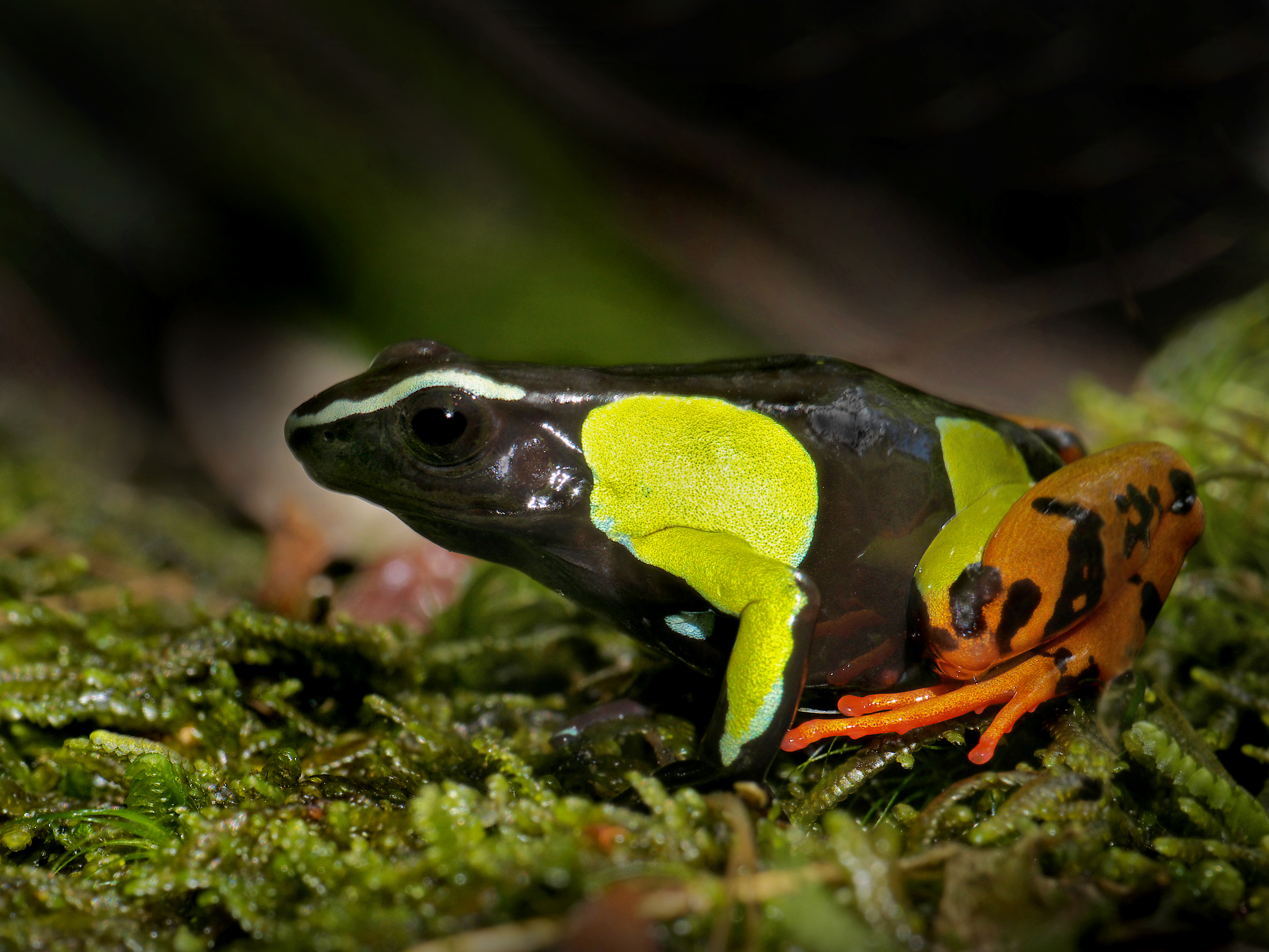
Baron's Mantella is an endemic Malagasy frog species named after Richard Baron.

Reverend Richard Baron (8 September 1847 – 12 October 1907) was an English missionary and botanist who worked and lived in Madagascar from 1872 to 1907.

Baron attended Lancashire College and was ordained 1872 in Kendal. During his mission in Madagascar from 1872 onwards, he travelled extensively and collected a large number of plants; he sent roughly 12,000 specimens to the Royal Botanical Gardens, Kew, and also deposited collections in other herbaria. He may have discovered up to 1000 new plant species. Besides botany, Baron was also interested in geology and collected amphibians. He quickly learned Malagasy, and published the first Malagasy-language textbooks on plants and geology. Together with James Sibree, Jr., another missionary, he edited the English-language journal Antananarivo Annual.

His Compendium des plantes malgaches was the first summary of the vascular plant species known from Madagascar. It was compiled in several volumes from 1900 to 1906 and would eventually list over 4700 species and varieties in 970 genera.

Baron died in 1907 from a fever attack while he was in England. Several Malagasy taxa were named after him, including the plant genera Baronia, Baroniella, and Neobaronia.

== Bibliography ==
- 1882: From Ambatondrazaka to Fenoarivo, Antananarivo Annual: 75–94
- 1882: Botany, na filazana ny amy ny zava-maniry sy ny fombany, L.M.S. College, Antananarivo
- 1882: Twelve Hundred Miles in a Palanquin, Antananarivo Annual: 434–458
- 1887: Over New Ground: A Journey to Mandritsara and the North-West Coast, Antananarivo Annual: 261–282
- 1889: The Flora of Madagascar, Journal of the Linnaean Society, Botany 42: 246–294.
- 1889: Notes on the Geology of Madagascar Quarterly Journal of the Geological Society:305–331.
- 1890: A Malagasy forest, Antananarivo Annual: 196–211
- 1890: Ten Years Review of Mission Work in Madagascar, 1880-1890
- 1904, with Mouneyres: Rapport sur une tournée géologique effectuée en 1903 dans le Nord et le Nord-Ouest de Madagascar, Bulletin Économique de Madagascar: 1–20
- 1900–1906: Compendium des plantes malgaches

== Fellowships ==
- Fellow of the Linnean Society, 1882
- Fellow of the Geological Society, 1889
- Member of the Académie Malgache, 1902
