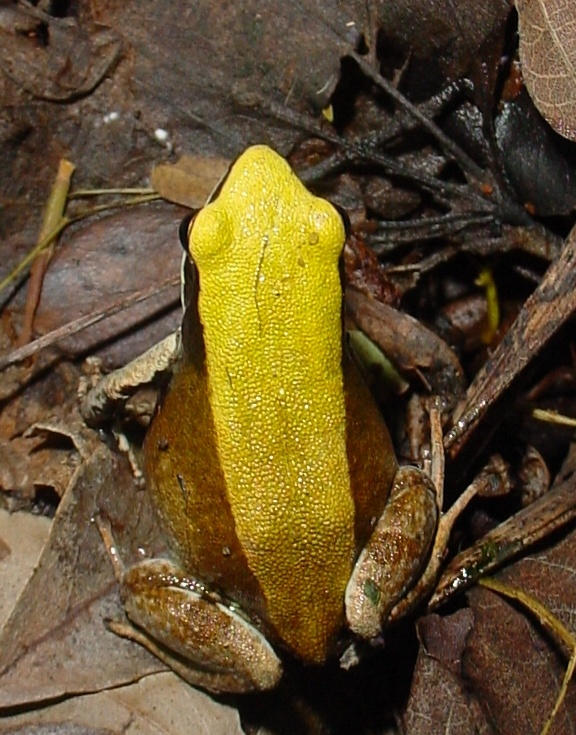

Conservation status
- Endangered (IUCN 3.1)

Scientific classification
- Kingdom: Animalia
- Phylum: Chordata
- Class: Amphibia
- Order: Anura
- Family: Mantellidae
- Genus: Mantella
- Species: M. viridis

Binomial name
- Mantella viridis Pintak & Böhme, 1988

= Green mantella =

Green Mantella

Species of frog

The green mantella (Mantella viridis) is a species of frog in the family Mantellidae. It is endemic to Madagascar. Its natural habitats are subtropical or tropical dry forests, rivers, intermittent rivers, and heavily degraded former forest. It is threatened by habitat loss. The commercial trade in these species requires tight regulation in order not to threaten it.

== Description ==
The green mantella is a small frog. Males are 22−25 mm, females 25−30 mm. The species is common in the pet trade as a vivarium species. Some of the frogs appear more yellow in color. Its face is black with a white band around the top lip. The underside of the frog is black with blue speckles. The female species is predominantly larger with a more square snout. They are critically endangered because of the loss of habitat and over-collection for pet trade.

== Habitat ==
Green mantella live in extreme northern Madagascar and thrive in dry lowland forest at elevations between 50 and 300 meters above sea level.

== Diet ==
They also eat soft fruit. Green mantella require water, as most frogs do, but do not get it by drinking. Their permeable skin allows them to absorb the water.
