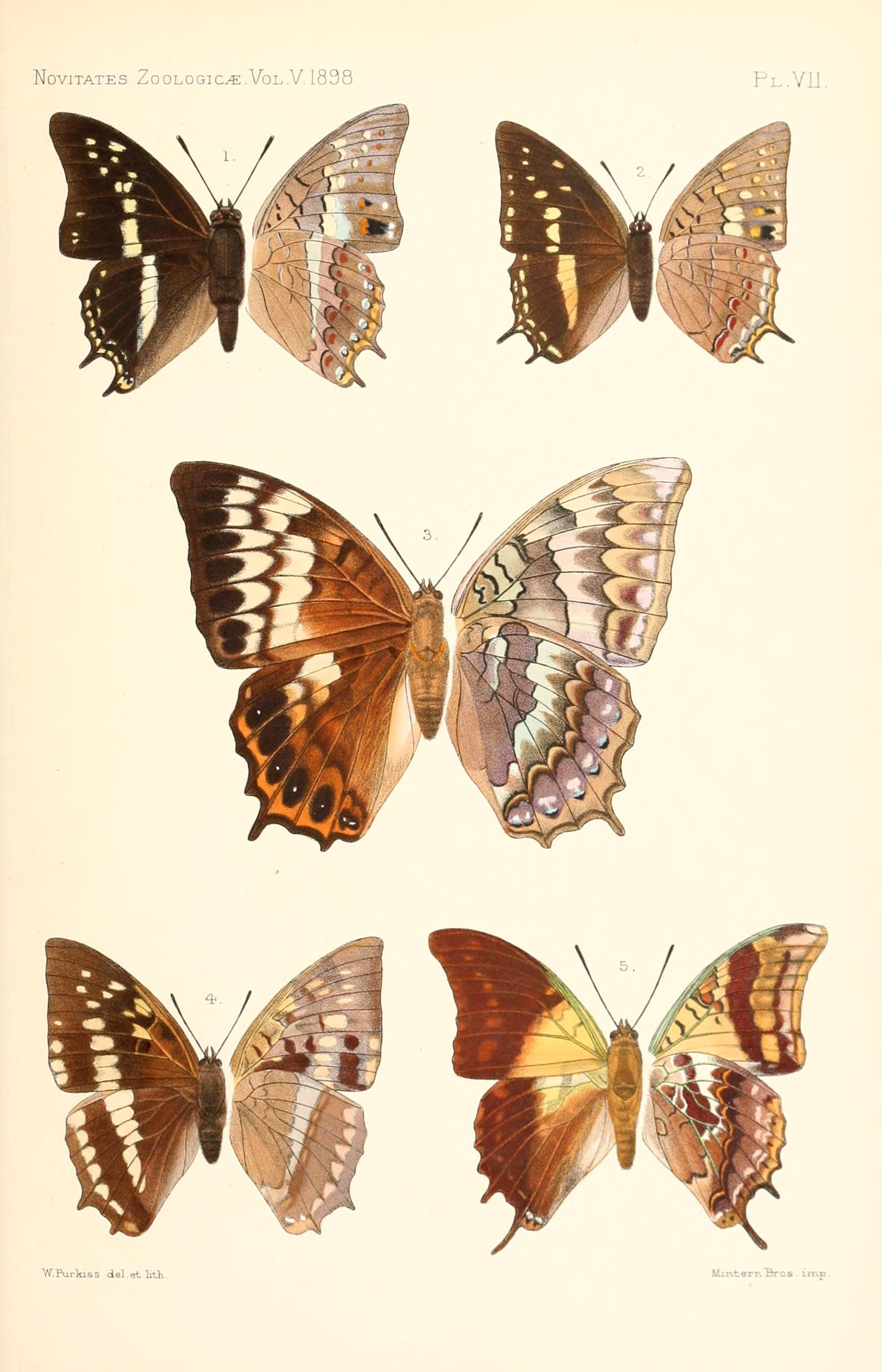
- Charaxes thomasius (bottom right)

Scientific classification
- Kingdom: Animalia
- Phylum: Arthropoda
- Class: Insecta
- Order: Lepidoptera
- Family: Nymphalidae
- Genus: Charaxes
- Species: C. thomasius

Binomial name
- Charaxes thomasius Staudinger, 1886

Synonyms
- Charaxes candiope thomasius Staudinger, 1886

= Charaxes thomasius =

Species of butterfly

Charaxes thomasius is a butterfly in the family Nymphalidae. It is found on the island of São Tomé.

== Taxonomy ==
The species is sometimes treated as a subspecies of Charaxes candiope. It is considered part of the Charaxes candiope group.

== Realm ==
Afrotropical realm.
