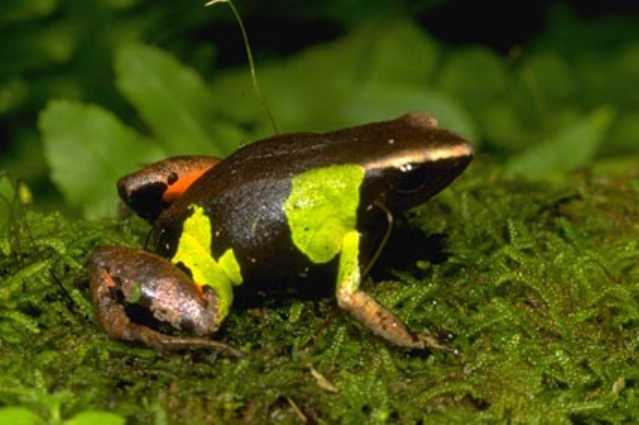

Conservation status
- Near Threatened (IUCN 3.1)

Scientific classification
- Kingdom: Animalia
- Phylum: Chordata
- Class: Amphibia
- Order: Anura
- Family: Mantellidae
- Genus: Mantella
- Species: M. pulchra

Binomial name
- Mantella pulchra Parker, 1925
- Approximate distribution (Madagascar) Range

= Beautiful mantella =

Species of amphibian

The beautiful mantella, Parker's mantella, or splendid mantella (Mantella pulchra) is a species of frogs in the family Mantellidae.

It is endemic to Madagascar. Its natural habitats are subtropical or tropical moist lowland forests, subtropical or tropical swamps, and swamps. It is threatened by habitat loss. It may be threatened by the pet trade, but too little is known about commercial collections.
