= Batrachology =

Branch of herpetology that studies amphibians

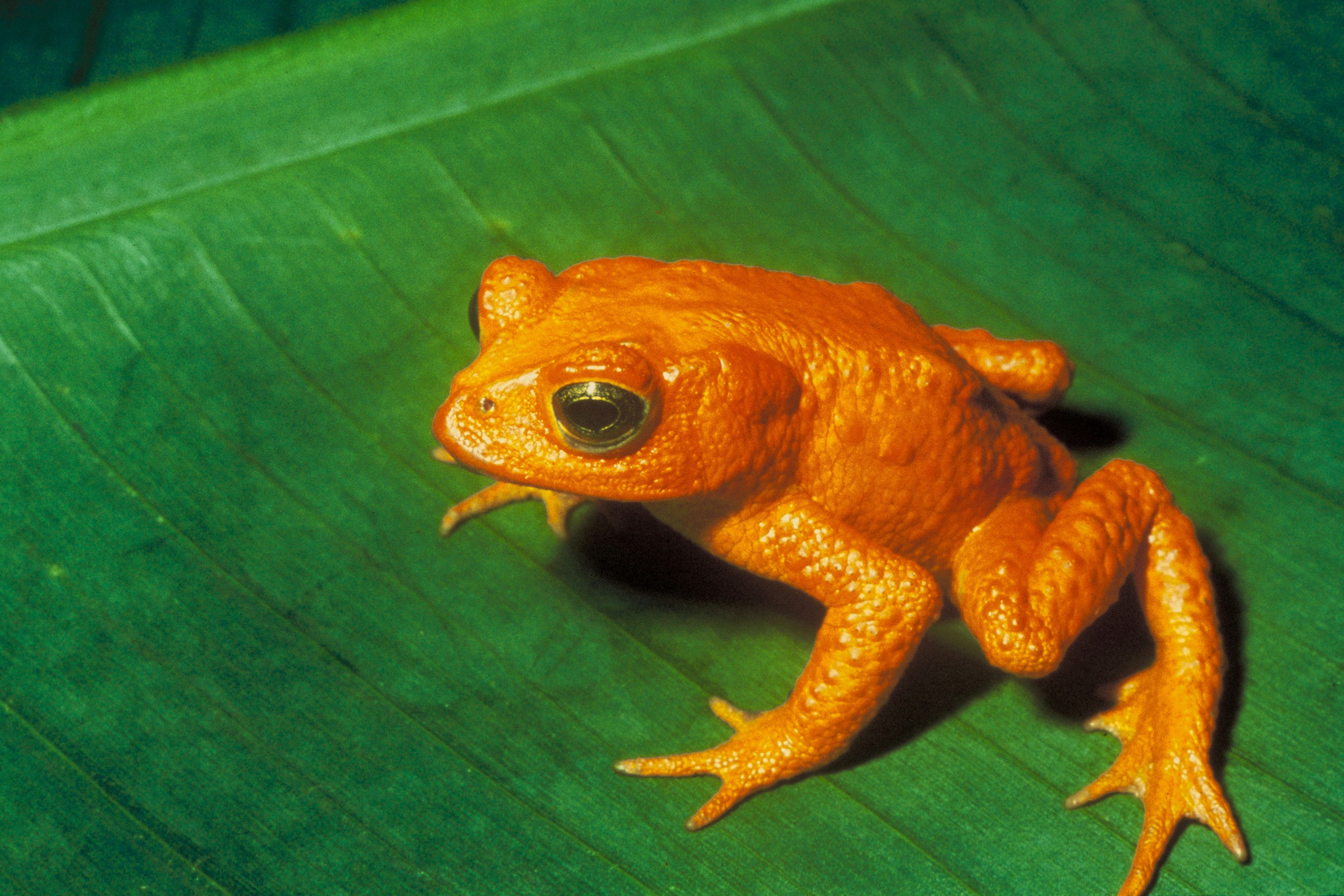
Bufo periglenes

Batrachology, from Ancient Greek βάτραχος (bátrakhos), meaning "frog", and λόγος (lógos), meaning "study", is the branch of zoology concerned with the study of amphibians including frogs, salamanders, and caecilians. It is a sub-discipline of herpetology, which also includes non-avian reptiles (snakes, lizards, turtles, crocodilians, and the tuatara). Batrachologists may study the evolution, ecology, ethology, or anatomy of amphibians.

Amphibians are cold blooded vertebrates largely found in damp habitats although many species have special behavioural adaptations that allow them to live in deserts, trees, underground and in regions with wide seasonal variations in temperature. There are over 8,700 species of amphibians.

== Notable batrachologists ==
- Jean Marius René Guibé, The frogs Boophis guibei, Mantidactylus guibei and Ptychadena guibei, the chameleon Calumma guibei, the gecko Lygodactylus guibei, and the snake Oxyrhopus guibei were named in his honor. The genus Guibemantis, which includes several species of frogs that are endemic to Madagascar, was also named in honor of Jean Guibé.
- Gabriel Bibron, classified numerous reptile species with André Marie Constant Duméril (1774–1860) and produced the Erpétologie Générale, a comprehensive account of the reptiles, published in ten volumes from 1834 to 1854.
- Oskar Boettger, became a paleontologist at the Senckenberg Museum in Frankfurt, where in 1875 he became the curator of the museum's department of herpetology. He is credited for making Senckenberg's herpetological collection among the best in Europe and was editor of Katalog der Batrachier-Sammlung im Museum der Senckenbergischen naturforschenden Gesellschaft in Frankfurt am Main as well as Katalog der Reptilien-Sammlung im Museum der Senckenbergischen naturforschenden Gesellschaft in Frankfurt am Main.
- George Albert Boulenger, wrote the Snakes of Europe and gave scientific names to over 2,000 new animal species, chiefly fish, reptiles, and amphibians.
- Edward Drinker Cope, named more than 1,000 vertebrate species, including hundreds of fishes and dozens of dinosaurs. His proposal for the origin of mammalian molars is notable among his theoretical contributions.
- François Marie Daudin, published Histoire naturelle des reinettes, des grenouilles et des crapauds (Natural history of tree frogs, frogs and toads) in 1802, and Histoire naturelle, générale et particulière des reptiles (Natural History of Reptiles) (8 volumes) in 1802–1803. This latter work contained descriptions of 517 species, many for the first time, based on examining over 1,100 specimens.
- Franz Werner, described numerous species and other taxa of frogs, snakes, insects, and other organisms.
- Leszek Berger, discovered hybridogenesis in amphibians.
