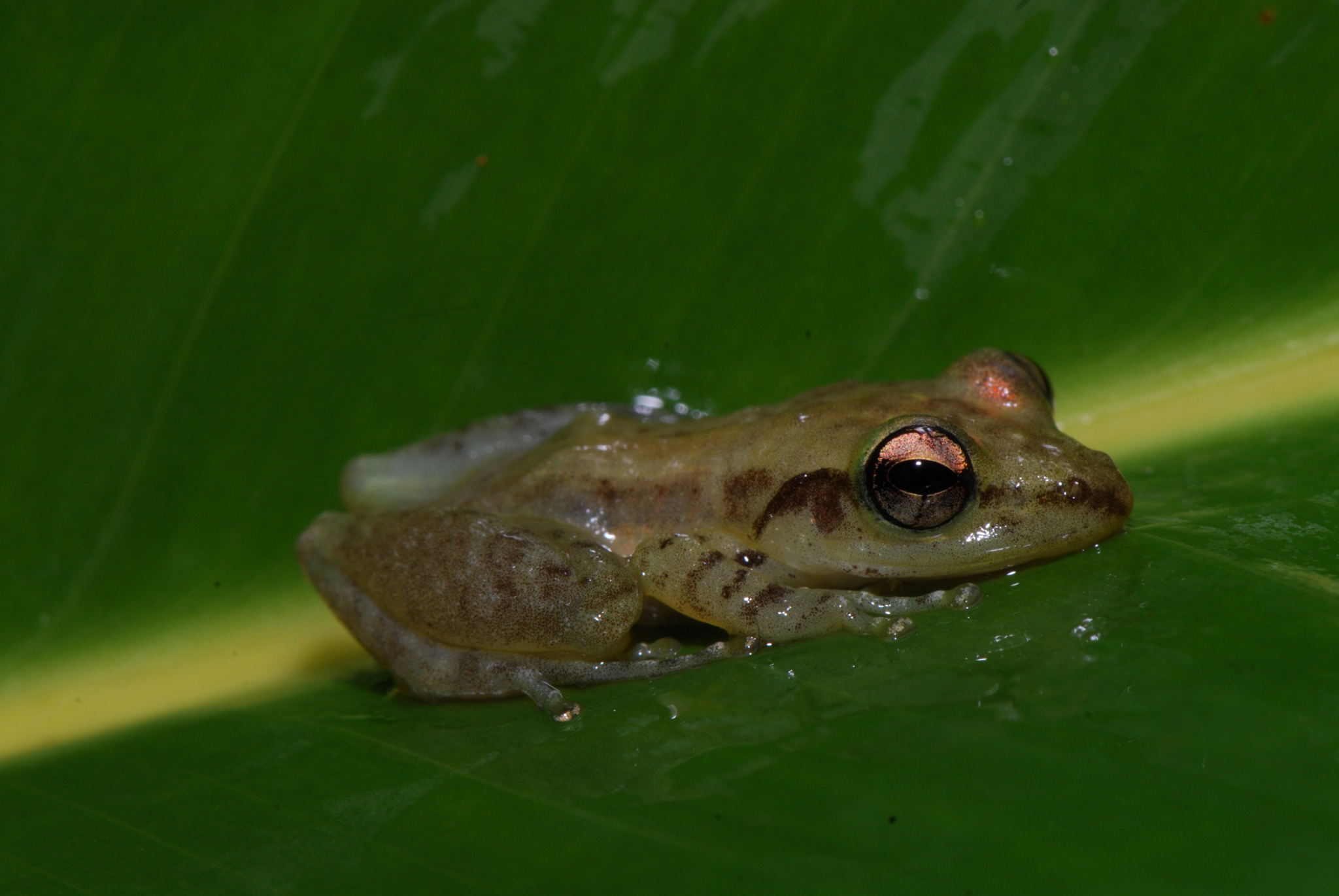

Conservation status
- Least Concern (IUCN 3.1)

Scientific classification
- Kingdom: Animalia
- Phylum: Chordata
- Class: Amphibia
- Order: Anura
- Family: Mantellidae
- Genus: Guibemantis
- Species: G. methueni

Binomial name
- Guibemantis methueni (Angel, 1929)

Synonyms
- Gephyromantis methueni Angel, 1929; Mantidactylus (Mantidactylus) methueni Ahl, 1931

= Guibemantis methueni =

Species of frog

Guibemantis methueni is a species of frog in the family Mantellidae. It is endemic to Madagascar, occurring at altitudes below 980 m ASL on the east coast of the island.

== Taxonomy ==
This species was formerly synonymous with Guibemantis bicalcaratus, but was re-elevated to species status in 2013 following phylogenetic analysis. Per R.M.A. Blommers-Schlösser, who initially lumped the two species, there are few evident morphological differences between these two species and their congener, Guibemantis pulcher; however, G. pulcher can be differentiated by its brighter green coloration and violet markings.

== Ecology ==
It lays its eggs in the cups formed at the axil of Pandanus spp. trees, where its tadpoles will also develop in the small pools of water.
