= Spinomantis elegans =

Conservation status
- Near Threatened (IUCN 3.1)

Scientific classification
- Kingdom: Animalia
- Phylum: Chordata
- Class: Amphibia
- Order: Anura
- Family: Mantellidae
- Genus: Spinomantis
- Species: S. elegans

Binomial name
- Spinomantis elegans (Guibé, 1974)

Synonyms
- Mantidactyllus (Guibemantis) elegans (Guibé, 1974); Mantidactylus elegans (Guibé, 1974); Gephyromantis elegans (Guibé, 1974)

Species of frog

Spinomantis elegans is a species of frog in the Mantellid subfamily Mantellinae, endemic to Madagascar.

== Taxonomy ==
This species was described in the genus Rhacophorus by Guibé in 1974. He later transferred it to Mantidactylus. Dubois put it in the subgenus Guibemantis, but it was later moved to Spinomantis.

== Distribution and habitat ==
S. elegans occurs only in south-eastern Madagascar, with uncertain records form northern Madagascar. It has been recorded at elevations of 1,350-2,500 m, where it inhabits are subtropical or tropical moist montane forest and grasslands, always associated with rocky areas. It breeds in streams.

== Conservation ==
The species appears to be rare, and no males have ever been collected. It is currently classified as Near Threatened by the IUCN. Its forest habitat is constantly shrinking due to anthropogenic influences. S. elegans is present in several protected areas.
