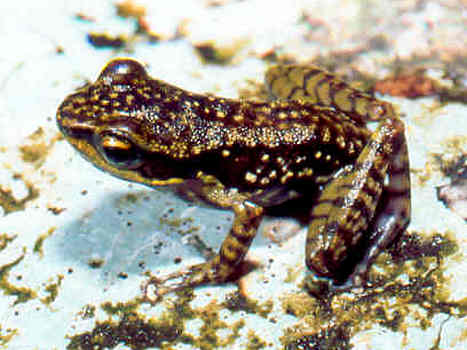

Conservation status
- Near Threatened (IUCN 3.1)

Scientific classification
- Kingdom: Animalia
- Phylum: Chordata
- Class: Amphibia
- Order: Anura
- Family: Mantellidae
- Genus: Spinomantis
- Species: S. bertini

Binomial name
- Spinomantis bertini (Guibé, 1947)

Synonyms
- Gephyromantis bertini Guibé, 1947; Mantidactylus bertini (Guibé, 1947)

= Spinomantis bertini =

Species of frog

Spinomantis bertini is a species of frog in the mantellid subfamily Mantellinae, endemic to Madagascar.

== Taxonomy ==
This species was described in the genus Gephyromantis by Guibé in 1947. It was transferred to the genus Mantidactylus by Blommers-Schlösser in 1979. Dubois put it in the subgenus Spinomantis, which was elevated to genus-level in 2006.

== Distribution and habitat ==
S. bertini has a relatively broad distribution in south-eastern Madagascar, at elevations of 500–1,300 m (1,600–4,300 ft) above sea level. It inhabits crevices among boulders and rocky areas, usually close to flowing waters, in pristine forest habitats; the species is not found in degraded forests or secondary growth.

== Conservation ==
The species is classified as Near Threatened by the IUCN. It is under pressure from habitat loss through expansion of agriculture, timber and coal production, and settlements, as well as the spread of invasive plants like eucalypts.
