= Spinomantis microtis =

Conservation status
- Endangered (IUCN 3.1)

Scientific classification
- Kingdom: Animalia
- Phylum: Chordata
- Class: Amphibia
- Order: Anura
- Family: Mantellidae
- Genus: Spinomantis
- Species: S. microtis

Binomial name
- Spinomantis microtis (Guibé, 1974)

Synonyms
- Rhacophorus microtis Guibé, 1974; Boophis microtis (Guibé, 1974); Mantidactylus microtis (Guibé, 1974)

Species of frog

Spinomantis microtis is a species of frog in the Mantellid subfamily Mantellinae, endemic to Madagascar.

== Taxonomy ==
This species was described in the genus Rhacophorus by Guibé in 1974. Glaw and Vences transferred it to Boophis in 1994. Andreone and Randriamahazo transferred it to Mantidactylus in 1997, and finally Glaw and Vences then moved it to Spinomantis in 2006.

== Habitat and ecology ==
Its natural habitats are subtropical or tropical moist lowland forests, subtropical or tropical moist montane forests, and rivers. It is threatened by habitat loss.
