= Guibemantis albolineatus =

Conservation status
- Least Concern (IUCN 3.1)

Scientific classification
- Kingdom: Animalia
- Phylum: Chordata
- Class: Amphibia
- Order: Anura
- Family: Mantellidae
- Genus: Guibemantis
- Subgenus: Pandanusicola
- Species: G. albolineatus

Binomial name
- Guibemantis albolineatus (Blommers-Schlösser and Blanc, 1991)

Synonyms
- Mantidactylus albolineatus Blommers-Schlösser and Blanc, 1991

Species of frog

Guibemantis albolineatus, also known as the white-lined Madagascar frog, is a species of frog in the family Mantellidae. It is endemic to Madagascar. It is known from the southeastern part of the island. However, there is some confusion between this species and Guibemantis bicalcaratus, as well as possibly undescribed species, making its actual distribution unclear.

== Description ==
Both males and females grow to about 24 mm (0.9 in) in snout–vent length, although they are often smaller. The snout is square in dorsal and ventral view. The fingers have rudimentary webbing whereas the feet are partially webbed. Dorsal skin is smooth. Coloration is chocolate brown with two greenish dorsolateral bands. Males have distinct and well-delimited femoral glands.

== Habitat and conservation ==
Guibemantis albolineatus is an arboreal frog inhabiting pristine rainforest at elevations of 300–1,500 m (980–4,920 ft) above sea level. It is in particular associated with Pandanus species (as is typical for the subgenus Pandanusicola). The eggs are deposited in leaf axils, often those of Pandanus, and the tadpoles develop in this same microhabitat. It is a rarely recorded species that is threatened by habitat loss. It is present in Andohahela and Marojejy National Parks, and probably in other protected areas too.
