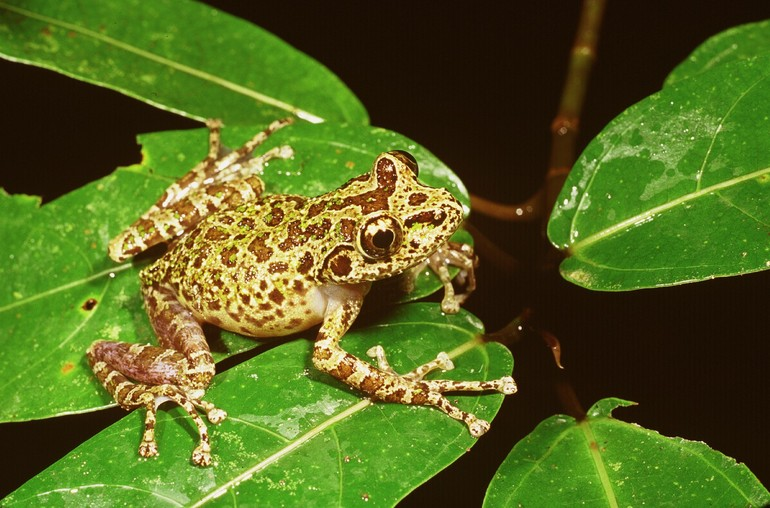

Conservation status
- Least Concern (IUCN 3.1)

Scientific classification
- Kingdom: Animalia
- Phylum: Chordata
- Class: Amphibia
- Order: Anura
- Family: Mantellidae
- Genus: Spinomantis
- Species: S. peraccae

Binomial name
- Spinomantis peraccae (Boulenger, 1896)

Synonyms
- Rhacophorus Peraccae Boulenger, 1896; Mantidactylus peraccae (Boulenger, 1896); Mantidactylus (Guibemantis) peraccae (Boulenger, 1896); Mantidactylus (Spinomantis) peraccae (Boulenger, 1896)

= Spinomantis peraccae =

Species of frog

Spinomantis peraccae is a species of frog in the mantellid subfamily Mantellinae. It is endemic to Madagascar and widely distributed in the northern, eastern, and central parts of the island. The specific epithet honours Italian herpetologist Mario Giacinto Peracca. Common name Peracca's Madagascar frog has been coined for it.

== Taxonomy ==
George Albert Boulenger described this species in 1896 within the genus Rhacophorus. Rose M. A. Blommers-Schlösser transferred it to Mantidactylus in 1978. Alain Dubois placed it in the then-subgenus Blommersia in 1992, but it was moved to the then-subgenus Spinomantis by Glaw and Vences in 1994.

== Description ==
Adult males measure 34–44 mm (1.3–1.7 in) and adult females 39–45 mm (1.5–1.8 in) in snout–vent length. The snout is rounded. The tympanum is distinct and supra-tympanic fold is prominent. The fingers have expanded discs but no webbing; the toes are webbed but the discs are smaller than those on the fingers. The dorsum is brownish-greenish and has darker blotches. Dorsal skin is rather warty with dark, protruding dots. The lower parts are whitish; there are few dark spots on the throat.

== Geographic range ==
It is endemic to the eastern half of Madagascar.

== Habitat ==
Spinomantis peraccae occurs in pristine rainforest along streams at elevations of 500–2,000 m (1,600–6,600 ft) above sea level. It is arboreal. The eggs are laid on leaves above water. The tadpole develop in slow-flowing streams.

== Conservation status ==
Spinomantis peraccae is a locally abundant species, but it is suffering from habitat loss. It occurs in many protected areas. Because of its wide range and large overall population, it is not considered threatened.
