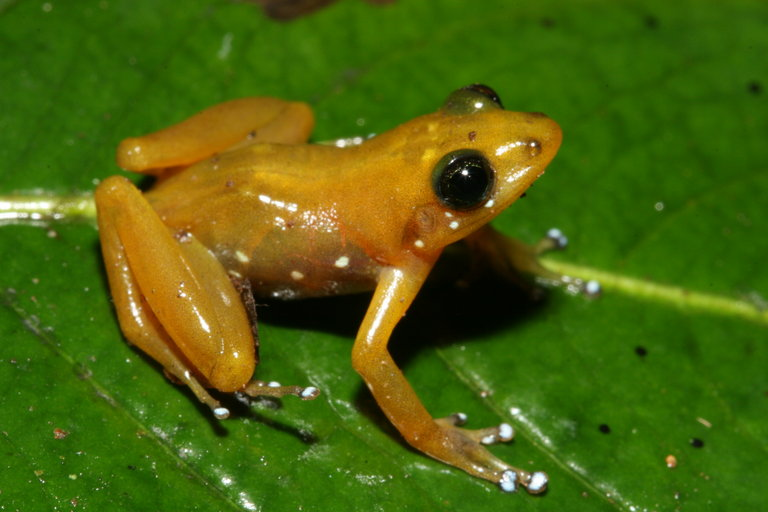

Conservation status
- Least Concern (IUCN 3.1)

Scientific classification
- Kingdom: Animalia
- Phylum: Chordata
- Class: Amphibia
- Order: Anura
- Family: Mantellidae
- Genus: Blommersia
- Species: B. angolafa

Binomial name
- Blommersia angolafa Andreone, Rosa, Noël, Crottini, Vences, & Raxworthy, 2010

= Blommersia angolafa =

Species of amphibian

Blommersia angolafa is a species of frogs in the family Mantellidae. It is endemic to eastern Madagascar. The specific epithet is derived from the term “angolafa” or “angolafo”, which is the Malagasy vernacular name used by the Betsimisaraka people for the Dypsis palm species (mostly for Dypsis lastelliana), whose leaves and prophylls are the habitat for this frog.

== Description ==
Blommersia angolafa is a small frog, with a body size of 17–21 mm, enlarged tips on fingers and toes, and without any dark area in the tympanic and frenal region, present in the other Blommersia. B. angolafa has a rather uniform dorso-lateral colouration, shading from yellowish–light brownish to dark brown, with light-bluish spots on the flanks and light-bluish terminal parts of the fingers and toes. The species also appears to be chromatically sexually dimorphic. In fact, males differ from females in having a light colouration, while females are more brownish.

Blommersia angolafa is similar to B. grandisonae. Although both B. angolafa and B. grandisonae have enlarged finger tips, they are much more developed in B. angolafa.

=== Eggs and tadpoles ===
Egg clutches are found only from December onwards; they are glued to the inside walls of palms' dead prophylls filled with water and fallen on the ground. Several different stages of tadpoles can be found sharing the water accumulated within the same fallen prophyll. Under captive conditions, all the eggs of a single clutch hatched after a period of 7–10 days, and the total duration of the larval development was 57–70 days.

== Distribution and habitat ==
Blommersia angolafa occurs at four forest blocks in eastern Madagascar: Masoala, Ambatovaky, Zahamena and Betampona and occupies rain forest with an elevation range between 90 m (Ankavanana River, Masoala Peninsula) and 508 m (Vohitsivalana, RNI de Betampona). It is found both in primary and secondary forest, due to the tolerance of some Dypsis palms to occur in secondary rain forest at Betampona. The observed elevational distribution at Betampona ranged from 332–548 m asl. Andreone et al. suggest that this species may also occur at other rain forest sites that fall within this elevational and latitudinal range for eastern Madagascar, such as Makira and Mananara Nord.

== Life history, activity and special behaviours ==
A peculiar aspect characterising this species is its novel life history and reproductive mode. Both sexes live and breed in a phytotelmic habitat of water accumulated within fallen prophylls and fallen leaf sheaths of at least three species of Dypsis palms. Within these phytotelmata, egg laying and complete larval development occur. Andreone et al. never observed individuals outside dead fallen Dypsis phytotelmata that were lying on the forest floor or that contained rainfall.

=== Call ===
The advertisement call of B. angolafa starts at the end of September and continues mostly continuously until the end of February to early March. Calling males are usually heard during the dusk and early at night. The call consists of two notes, rather similar to those described for B. grandisonae and B. domerguei. Note of type 1 is a long and clearly pulsed note with a duration of 221–233 ms and consisting of 9–11 pulses that are repeated with a pulse repetition rate of 44–52 per second. One such pulsed note is followed by an irregular series of up to 13–29 notes of type 2 which are shorter and of irregular structure. Notes of type 2 can be short clicks consisting of a single main pulse and with a duration of 10–17 ms (n=2) or can consist of up to eight distinctly separated pulses each and then have durations of 63–86 ms, with all intermediate states occurring so that a clear distinction of further different note types is not possible. Intervals between notes of type 2 in a note series have a duration of 73–191 ms. The frequency appears as a more or less regular band between about 2,500–5,500 Hz; although, the fundamental frequency may be higher than 2,500 Hz.

== Trends and threats ==
B. angolafa are only known from phytotelmata of Dypsis palms. These palms are suffering from selective logging and deforestation. Thus, the conservation situation for B. angolafa is potentially and negatively affected by the palms' threatened status. Most of the Dypsis palms (or at least Dypsis lastelliana) are also threatened by selective logging habitat destruction, fire, harvesting for palm heart, and plant and seed collection by palm enthusiasts.

== Phylogenetic relationships ==
Andreone et al. suggest that the reproductive mode of B. angolafa is a derived character, having evolved from the more typical reproduction in lentic water bodies. The general scarcity of lentic habitats in Malagasy rain forests may have provided the conditions that favoured the evolution of this phytotelmic breeding strategy.

== See also ==
- Amphibians of Madagascar
