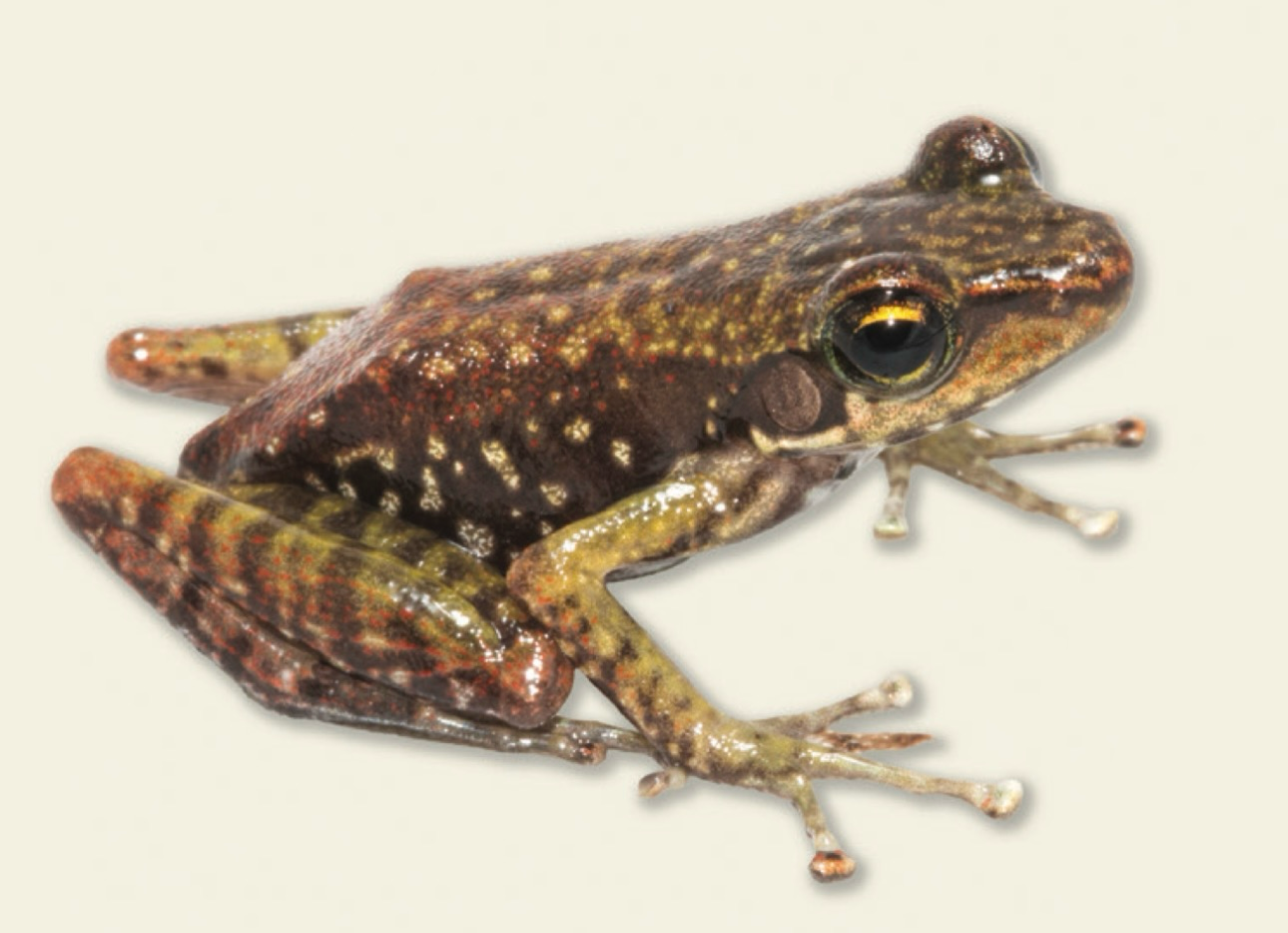

Scientific classification
- Kingdom: Animalia
- Phylum: Chordata
- Class: Amphibia
- Order: Anura
- Family: Mantellidae
- Subfamily: Mantellinae
- Genus: Spinomantis
- Species: S. lakolosy

Binomial name
- Spinomantis lakolosy Hutter, Andriampenomanana, Lambert & Vences, 2025
- Type locality in Madagascar

= Spinomantis lakolosy =

Species of frog

Spinomantis lakolosy is a species of frog in the family Mantellidae. It is endemic to the high-altitude rainforest of Ranomafana National Park in the Madagascar.

== Etymology ==
The specific name lakolosy is a Malagasy word meaning "bell", chosen to describe the species' advertisement call, which sounds like a ringing bell.

== Description ==
The species’ dorsal color pattern is dark brown with mottling in golden-olive and small whitish dots. The flanks are dark with irregular white spots and blend diffusely into the dorsal coloration without a sharp border. On the underside of the legs, there are alternating bands of light brown and dark brown. A thick frenal stripe is present. The species lacks dermal fringes or spines.

The holotype has a snout-vent length of 21.8 mm (0.86 in). The body is slender, the head is longer than wide, and the snout is rounded in dorsal view and pointed in lateral view. The tympanum is distinct and rounded. Fingers and toes have enlarged disks, with fingers unwebbed and toes having rudimentary webbing. The skin on the dorsum is smooth.

== Distribution and habitat ==
The species is reliably known only from Miranony Forest (1,100 m (3,600 ft) elevation) within Ranomafana National Park in Fianarantsoa province, Madagascar. It inhabits undisturbed, primary high-altitude rainforest, where individuals are found perched on low vegetation or mossy rocks near fast-flowing streams.

== Ecology ==
The advertisement call consists of a series of regularly repeated, short, bell-like tonal notes. In a recorded series, calls consisted of 7–10 notes, had a duration of 562–1150 ms, and a dominant frequency of 2454–2497 Hz. Note duration was 67–105 ms.

== Conservation status ==
The species is proposed for categorization as "endangered" under IUCN criteria due to its very restricted distribution (a single location), ongoing habitat fragmentation, and threats from slash-and-burn agriculture and forest product extraction within Ranomafana National Park.
