= Blommersia wittei =

Conservation status
- Least Concern (IUCN 3.1)

Scientific classification
- Kingdom: Animalia
- Phylum: Chordata
- Class: Amphibia
- Order: Anura
- Family: Mantellidae
- Genus: Blommersia
- Species: B. wittei

Binomial name
- Blommersia wittei (Guibé, 1974)

Synonyms
- Mantidactylus wittei Guibé, 1974

Species of frog

Blommersia wittei is a species of frog in the family Mantellidae. It is endemic to Madagascar. Its natural habitats are subtropical or tropical moist lowland forests, dry savanna, moist savanna, swamps, freshwater marshes, intermittent freshwater marshes, plantations, rural gardens, heavily degraded former forest, and ponds.
