= Spinomantis massi =

Conservation status
- Vulnerable (IUCN 3.1)

Scientific classification
- Kingdom: Animalia
- Phylum: Chordata
- Class: Amphibia
- Order: Anura
- Family: Mantellidae
- Genus: Spinomantis
- Species: S. massi

Binomial name
- Spinomantis massi (Glaw and Vences, 1994)

Synonyms
- Mantidactylus (Spinomantis) massi Glaw & Vences, 1994; Mantidactylus (Spinomantis) massorum Glaw & Vences, 1994; Spinomantis massorum (Glaw & Vences, 1994)

Species of frog

Spinomantis massi is a species of frog in the mantellid subfamily Mantellinae. It is endemic to the humid forests of northwestern Madagascar.

== Taxonomy ==
This species was described in the genus Mantidactylus, subgenus Spinomantis, by Frank Glaw and Miguel Vences in 1994. The species is named massi to congratulate the daughter of Frank Glaw, Andrea Mass née Glaw, and her husband Robert Mass, on their marriage. Therefore, plural form massorum should have been used, but this is considered an unjustified emendation. The correct specific name is therefore massi.

== Description ==
Adult males measure 33–42 mm (1.3–1.7 in) in snout–vent length (SVL); the only known adult female measured 38 mm (1.5 in). The head is wider than long. The tympanum is distinct. The fingers and toes bear enlarged, triangular disks. Males have a subgular vocal sac.

== Habitat and ecology ==
Its natural habitats are primary forest near streams at elevations of 300–1,750 m (980–5,740 ft) above sea level. It is an arboreal species that breeds in streams. It is threatened by habitat loss caused by subsistence agriculture, timber extraction, charcoal manufacture, the spread of invasive eucalyptus, and expanding human settlements.
