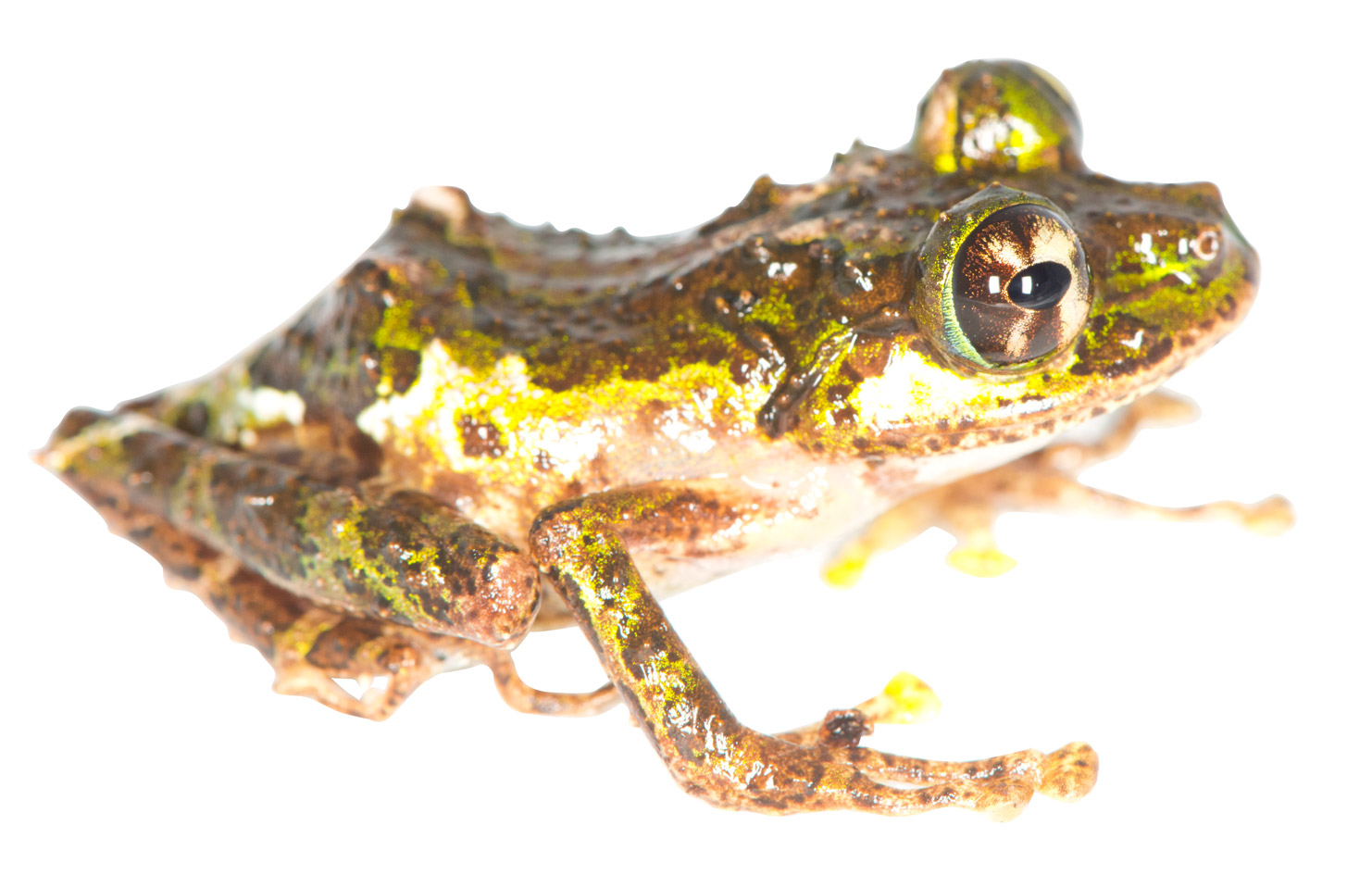

Conservation status
- Vulnerable (IUCN 3.1)

Scientific classification
- Kingdom: Animalia
- Phylum: Chordata
- Class: Amphibia
- Order: Anura
- Family: Mantellidae
- Genus: Spinomantis
- Species: S. tavaratra

Binomial name
- Spinomantis tavaratra Cramer, Rabibisoa, and Raxworthy, 2008

= Spinomantis tavaratra =

Species of amphibian

Spinomantis tavaratra is a species of frogs in the mantellid subfamily Mantellinae. It is endemic to the humid forests of northwestern Madagascar.

== Taxonomy ==
This species was described in the genus Spinomantis by Cramer, Rabibisoa, and Raxworthy in 2008. The species is named tavaratra is a Malagasy word for "the north", referencing the provenance of this species in northern Madagascar.

== Description ==
Adult males measure 30.5–36.0 mm (1.20–1.42 in) in snout–vent length (SVL); females measure 31.6–33.2 mm (1.24–1.31 in). The species is also characterised by simple dermal spines of less than 1 mm (0.039 in) length on the posterior margin of the tarsus.

== Habitat and ecology ==
Its natural habitats are primary forest near streams at elevations of 650–1,300 m (2,130–4,270 ft) above sea level, in Marojejy National Park but also on the Sorata massif. It is an arboreal species that breeds in streams.
