= Guibemantis pulcherrimus =

Scientific classification
- Kingdom: Animalia
- Phylum: Chordata
- Class: Amphibia
- Order: Anura
- Family: Mantellidae
- Genus: Guibemantis
- Species: G. pulcherrimus

Binomial name
- Guibemantis pulcherrimus Vences, Hutter, Glaw, Rakotoarison, Raselimanana & Scherz, 2023

Species of frog

Guibemantis pulcherrimus is a species of frog in the family Mantellidae. It is endemic to forests in the northern part Madagascar. It was discovered to be a distinct species in 2023, and can be distinguished from Guibemantis pulcher through its DNA, vocalizations and location. Additionally, they have more, but smaller, spots on their back, and less pronounced brown patches on their sides. Guibemantis pulcherrimus is named for its beauty, 'pulcherrimus' being Latin for more beautiful.
