= Guibemantis diphonus =

Conservation status
- Critically Endangered (IUCN 3.1)

Scientific classification
- Kingdom: Animalia
- Phylum: Chordata
- Class: Amphibia
- Order: Anura
- Family: Mantellidae
- Genus: Guibemantis
- Species: G. diphonus

Binomial name
- Guibemantis diphonus Vences, Jovanovic, Safarek, Glaw, and Köhler, 2015

Species of amphibian

Guibemantis diphonus is a species of arboreal frog in the family Mantellidae. It is endemic to Madagascar, where it is known only from the type locality of Manombo Special Reserve, Fianarantsoa Province.

Per the scientists who described this species, it is a sister taxon to Guibemantis timidus.
