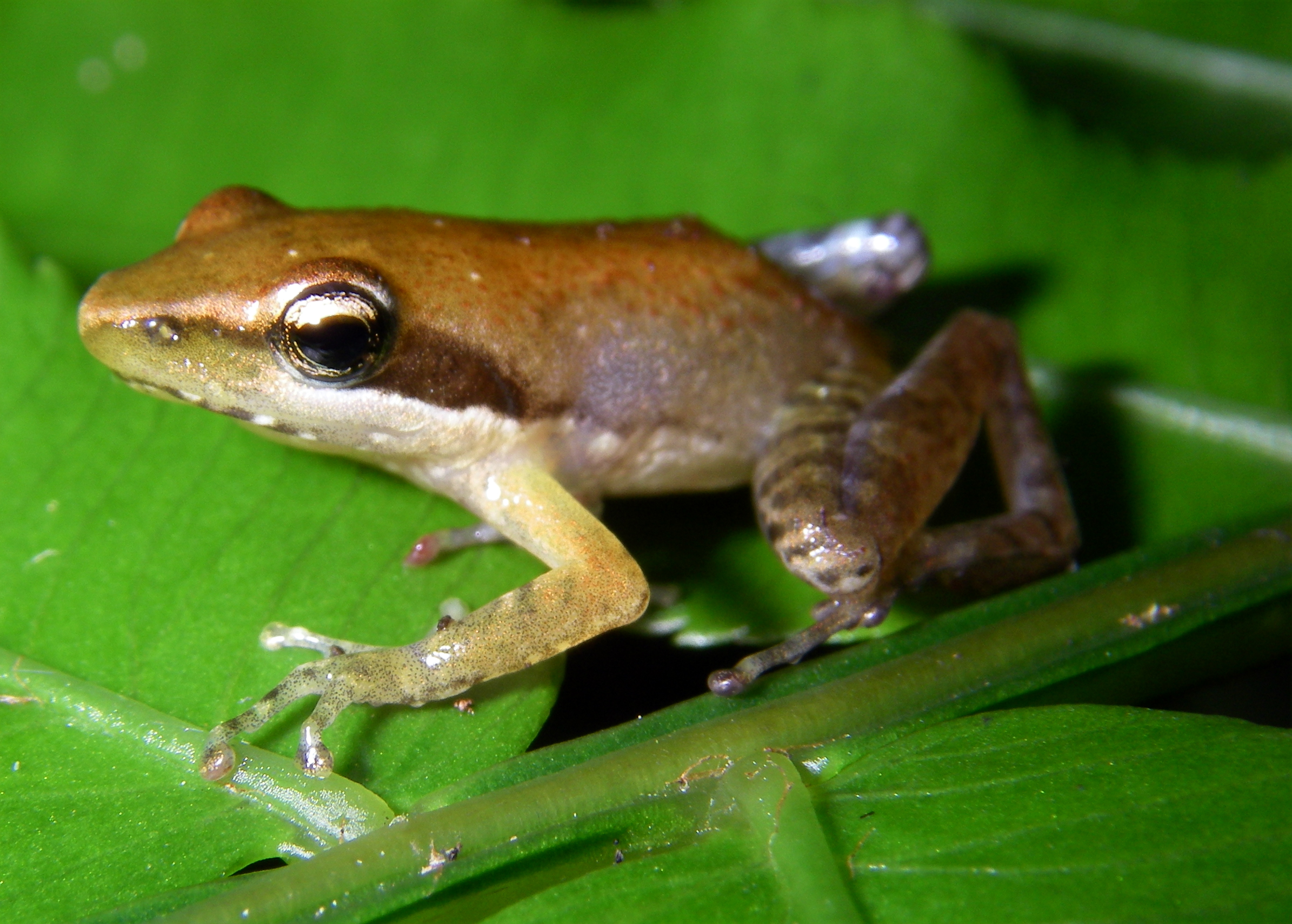

Conservation status
- Least Concern (IUCN 3.1)

Scientific classification
- Kingdom: Animalia
- Phylum: Chordata
- Class: Amphibia
- Order: Anura
- Family: Mantellidae
- Genus: Blommersia
- Species: B. blommersae

Binomial name
- Blommersia blommersae (Guibé, 1975)

Synonyms
- Gephyromantis blommersae Guibé, 1975; Mantidactylus blommersae (Guibé, 1975)

= Blommersia blommersae =

Species of frog

Blommersia blommersae is a species of frog in the family Mantellidae. It is endemic to east-central Madagascar. Both the generic and specific names honour Rose Marie Antoinette Blommers-Schlösser, a Dutch herpetologist and entomologist who collected the type series. Common name Moramanga Madagascar frog has been proposed for it.

== Description ==
Blommersia blommersae is a small frog that can grow to 22 mm (0.9 in) in snout–vent length. The overall appearance is slender. The fingers have no webbing whereas the toes are webbed. The colouration is variable: the dorsum is gray or light brown with darker, irregular spots, forming an inter-ocular bar and a V-shaped pattern on the scapular region. The canthal and tympanic regions are brown. The upper lip is white. The lower surfaces are irregularly speckled with dark, especially on the throat and chest.

The male advertisement call is a series of 2–3 chirps lasting about 70–150 ms.

Tadpoles in Gosner stage 25 measure 7–10 mm (0.3–0.4 in) and in stages 39–41 24–28 mm (0.9–1.1 in) in total length.

== Habitat and conservation ==
Blommersia blommersae occurs in swamps in or near forest at elevations of 800–1,780 m (2,620–5,840 ft) above sea level. It can occur in degraded habitats when swamps are present, but not in agricultural areas. Males often call from low vegetation. Breeding takes place in swamps; the eggs are laid on leaves above water. It is a locally very abundant species. It is suffering from the loss of forest habitats. It is known from one reserve near the Andasibe-Mantadia National Park and from the Ranomafana National Park.
