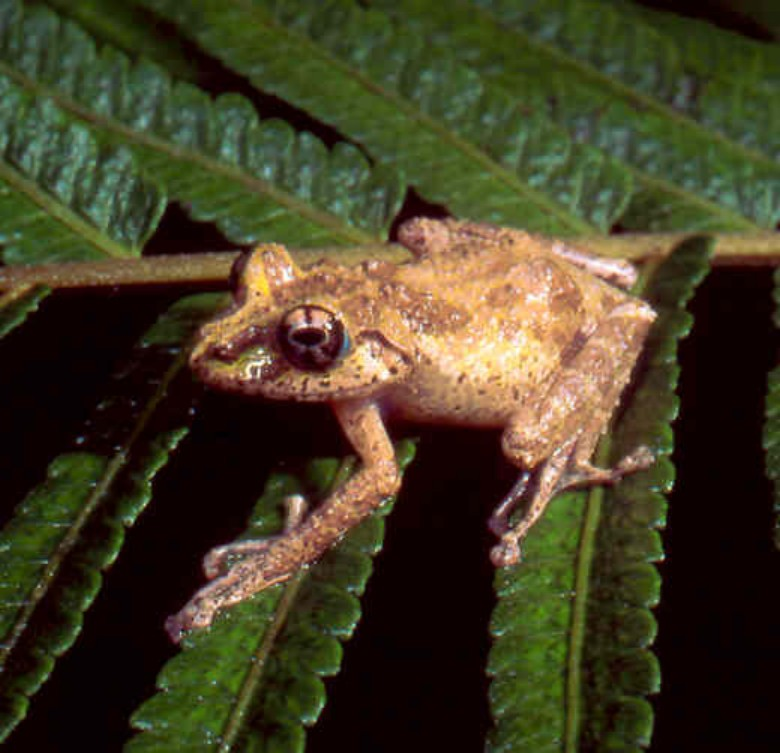

Conservation status
- Least Concern (IUCN 3.1)

Scientific classification
- Kingdom: Animalia
- Phylum: Chordata
- Class: Amphibia
- Order: Anura
- Family: Mantellidae
- Genus: Spinomantis
- Species: S. fimbriatus

Binomial name
- Spinomantis fimbriatus (Glaw & Vences, 1994)

Synonyms
- Mantidactylus fimbriatus Glaw & Vences, 1994

= Spinomantis fimbriatus =

Species of frog

Spinomantis fimbriatus is a species of frog in the Mantellid subfamily Mantellinae, endemic to Madagascar.

== Taxonomy ==
This species was described in the genus Mantidactylus, subgenus Spinomantis, by Glaw & Vences in 1994.

== Habitat and distribution ==
The species is endemic to Madagascar. It has been recorded from Andasibe in eastern Madagascar, north to Masoala, Anjanaharibe and Marojejy in northeastern Madagascar. Its natural habitats are pristine subtropical or tropical moist lowland forests at elevations of 500–1,000 m.

== Conservation ==
While S. fimbriatus is currently classified as Least Concern by the IUCN due to its abundant populations throughout its range, the species is likely under some pressure from loss of its forest habitat to agriculture, settlements, and timber and charcoal production, and the spread of invasive plants like eucalyptus.
