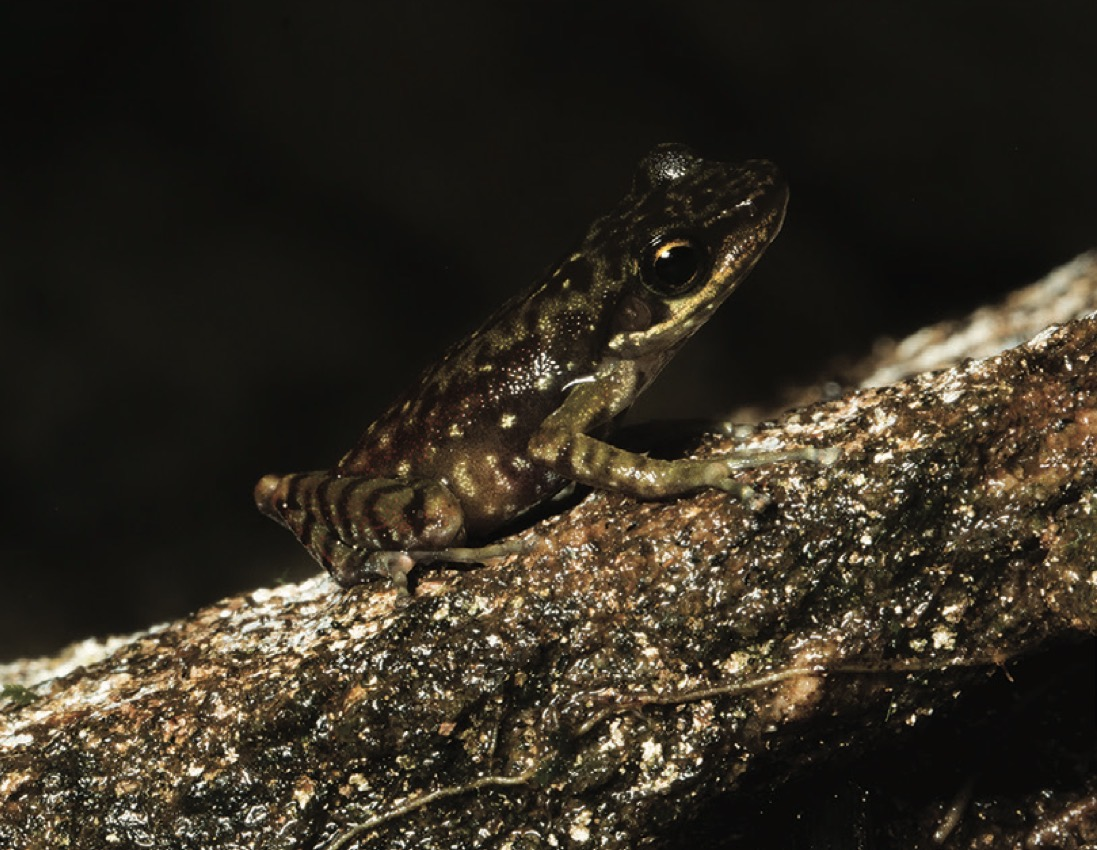

Scientific classification
- Kingdom: Animalia
- Phylum: Chordata
- Class: Amphibia
- Order: Anura
- Family: Mantellidae
- Subfamily: Mantellinae
- Genus: Spinomantis
- Species: S. lavabato

Binomial name
- Spinomantis lavabato Hutter, Andriampenomanana, Lambert & Vences, 2025
- Type locality in Madagascar

= Spinomantis lavabato =

Species of frog

Spinomantis lavabato is a species of frog in the family Mantellidae. It is endemic to the high-altitude rainforest of Ranomafana National Park in Madagascar.

== Etymology ==
The specific name lavabato is a Malagasy word/phrase literally meaning "rock hole" or "cave".

== Description ==
Both adult males and females are small, with males measuring 24.2 to 24.4 mm (~1 inch) in snout-vent length and the single known female measuring 26.7 mm (1.05 in). It possesses a slender body and a head that is longer than it is wide. In dorsal view, the snout is slightly pointed, while in lateral view it appears rounded. The tympanum is distinct and rounded. The fingers and toes bear distinctly enlarged disks. They are unwebbed, and the toes exhibit only rudimentary webbing. The skin on the dorsum is smooth. The dorsal coloration is dark brown with yellow-olive mottling. The flanks are darker, featuring mottling of white and a somewhat diffuse transition to the dorsal pattern. Whitish dots are present along the flank margins. The dorsal surfaces of the limbs show dark banding. A mottled frenal stripe is visible, and the species lacks dermal fringes or spines.

== Distribution and habitat ==
The species is known only from Maharira within Ranomafana National Park, Fianarantsoa province, Madagascar, at elevations of about 1,100–1,300 m (3,600–4,300 ft). It inhabits undisturbed, primary high-altitude rainforest, specifically in cave-like rock formations or on rocks alongside streams surrounded by large rock structures.

== Ecology ==
The advertisement call consists of a series of regularly repeated click notes. In a recorded series, calls consisted of 4–11 notes, had a duration of 368–1118 ms, and a dominant frequency of 3789–4134 Hz. Note duration was 27–67 ms, and amplitude increases from the first to the last note of a call.

== Conservation status ==
The species is proposed for categorization as Endangered under IUCN criteria due to its restricted distribution (a single locality), specialized rocky habitat, and threats from slash-and-burn agriculture and forest product extraction within Ranomafana National Park.
