= Spinomantis guibei =

Conservation status
- Vulnerable (IUCN 3.1)

Scientific classification
- Kingdom: Animalia
- Phylum: Chordata
- Class: Amphibia
- Order: Anura
- Family: Mantellidae
- Genus: Spinomantis
- Species: S. guibei

Binomial name
- Spinomantis guibei Blommers-Schlösser, 1991

Synonyms
- Gephyromantis elegans Guibé, 1974 — secondary homonym; Mantidactylus guibei Blommers-Schlösser, 1991; Mantidactylus (Blommersia) guibei (Blommers-Schlösser, 1991)

Species of frog

Spinomantis guibei is a species of frog in the Mantellid subfamily Mantellinae, endemic to Madagascar.

== Taxonomy ==
This species was originally described as a secondary homonym of Gephyromantis elegans by Guibé in 1974. A new name, Mantidactylus guibei was given for this species by Blommers-Schlösser in 1991. Dubois placed this species in the then-subgenus Blommersia, but it was later transferred to Spinomantis.

== Habitat and Ecology ==
Its natural habitats are subtropical or tropical moist montane forests and rocky areas. It is threatened by habitat loss.
