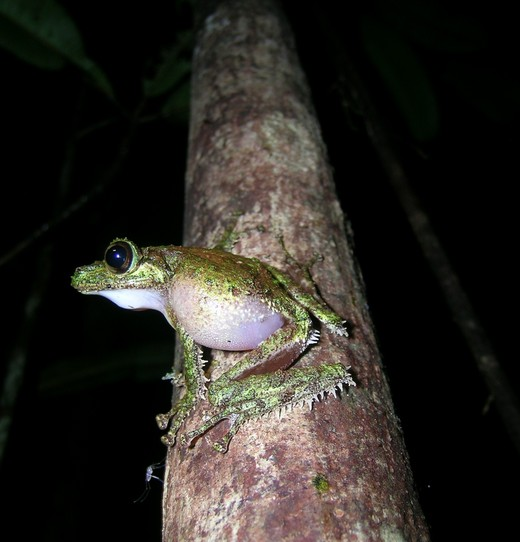

Conservation status
- Least Concern (IUCN 3.1)

Scientific classification
- Kingdom: Animalia
- Phylum: Chordata
- Class: Amphibia
- Order: Anura
- Family: Mantellidae
- Genus: Spinomantis
- Species: S. aglavei

Binomial name
- Spinomantis aglavei (Methuen & Hewitt, 1913)

Synonyms
- Mantidactylus aglavei (Methuen and Hewitt, 1913); Boophis sikorae (Boettger, 1913); Boophis aglavei (Methuen and Hewitt, 1913); Rhacophorus sikorae Boettger, 1913; Rhacophorus aglavei Methuen and Hewitt, 1913

= Spinomantis aglavei =

Species of frog

Spinomantis aglavei is a species of frog in the mantellid subfamily Mantellinae, endemic to Madagascar.

== Taxonomy ==
This species was originally described in the genus Rhacophorus. It was transferred to the genus Boophis by Guibé in 1947, and subsequently to the genus Mantidactylus by Blommers-Schlösser in 1979. Dubois made this species the type species of the subgenus Spinomantis, which was elevated to genus-level in 2006.

Oskar Boettger described Rhacophorus sikorae in 1913, but this name was considered a junior synonym of Spinomantis aglavei by Barbour and Loveridge in 1946 and all subsequent works.

== Habitat and ecology ==
This species occurs in subtropical or tropical moist lowland forests, subtropical or tropical moist montane forests, rivers, and swamps. It is threatened by habitat loss.
