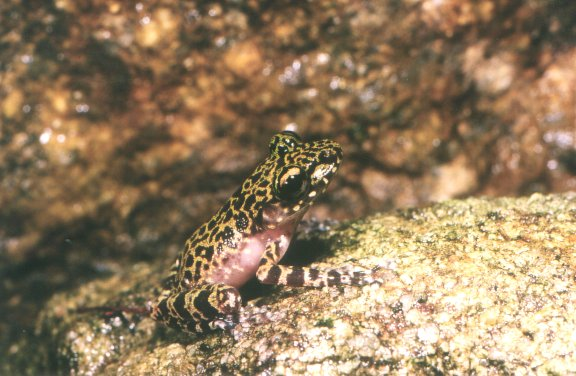

Conservation status
- Endangered (IUCN 3.1)

Scientific classification
- Kingdom: Animalia
- Phylum: Chordata
- Class: Amphibia
- Order: Anura
- Family: Mantellidae
- Genus: Spinomantis
- Species: S. brunae

Binomial name
- Spinomantis brunae (Andreone, Glaw, Vences, and Vallan, 1998)

Synonyms
- Mantidactylus brunae Andreone, Glaw, Vences, and Vallan, 1998

= Spinomantis brunae =

Species of amphibian

Spinomantis brunae (common name: Bruna's stream frog) is a species of frogs in the family Mantellidae. It is endemic to Madagascar and known from the Anosy Mountains in southeastern Madagascar.

== Description ==
Males measure 32–35 mm (1.3–1.4 in) in snout–vent length. Females are unknown. The dorsum is olive green with a reticulated pattern of dark brown spots. The flanks have white spots. The digit and toe pads bear a pair of white spots. The iris is creamy white. The tympanum is distinct. The body is granular dorsally, with weakly granular flanks and belly. The fingers and toes bear enlarged, triangular disks. Males have a subgular vocal sac.

== Habitat and conservation ==
Scpinomantis brunae occur in pristine forests at elevations of 600–800 m (2,000–2,600 ft) above sea level. It lives in crevices among boulders and rocky areas, usually close to flowing water. Its breeding habitat is unknown but could be flowing water; one male was observed to call on a branch half a metre above the ground by a small stream.

This species is locally moderately common. However, the frog is threatened by habitat loss caused by subsistence agriculture, logging, and expanding human settlements. It occurs in the Andohahela National Park.
