= Blommersia domerguei =

Conservation status
- Least Concern (IUCN 3.1)

Scientific classification
- Kingdom: Animalia
- Phylum: Chordata
- Class: Amphibia
- Order: Anura
- Family: Mantellidae
- Genus: Blommersia
- Species: B. domerguei

Binomial name
- Blommersia domerguei (Guibé, 1974)

Synonyms
- Mantidactylus domerguei (Guibé, 1974); Gephyromantis domerguei Guibé, 1974

Species of frog

Blommersia domerguei is a species of frog in the family Mantellidae. It is endemic to Madagascar. Its natural habitats are subtropical or tropical moist lowland forests, subtropical or tropical moist montane forests, subtropical or tropical high-altitude grassland, swamps, and heavily degraded former forest. It is threatened by habitat loss.
