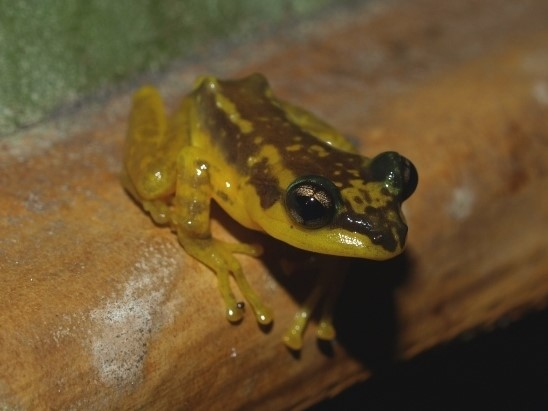

Conservation status
- Least Concern (IUCN 3.1)

Scientific classification
- Kingdom: Animalia
- Phylum: Chordata
- Class: Amphibia
- Order: Anura
- Family: Mantellidae
- Genus: Guibemantis
- Species: G. flavobrunneus

Binomial name
- Guibemantis flavobrunneus (Blommer-Schlösser, 1979)

= Guibemantis flavobrunneus =

Species of frog

Guibemantis flavobrunneus is a species of frog in the family Mantellidae. It is endemic to Madagascar. Its natural habitat is subtropical or tropical moist lowland forests. It is threatened by habitat loss.
