= Tsingymantis =

Conservation status
- Endangered (IUCN 3.1)

Scientific classification
- Kingdom: Animalia
- Phylum: Chordata
- Class: Amphibia
- Order: Anura
- Family: Mantellidae
- Subfamily: Mantellinae
- Genus: Tsingymantis; Glaw, Hoegg and Vences, 2006
- Species: T. antitra

Binomial name
- Tsingymantis antitra Glaw, Hoegg and Vences, 2006

Genus of amphibians

Tsingymantis is a monotypic genus of frogs in the family Mantellidae. The sole species is Tsingymantis antitra.

== Taxonomy ==
Tsingymantis antitra was described by Glaw, Hoegg and Vences in 2006. Its taxonomic placement within the family Mantellidae remains uncertain, as it appears to be a basal taxon.

== Distribution and habitat ==
This species is endemic to Ankarana Special Reserve, in northwestern Madagascar, where it lives among the limestone karst.
