= Blommersia bara =

Scientific classification
- Kingdom: Animalia
- Phylum: Chordata
- Class: Amphibia
- Order: Anura
- Family: Mantellidae
- Genus: Blommersia
- Species: B. bara

Binomial name
- Blommersia bara Vences, Multzsch, Köhler, Crottini, Andreone, Rakotoarison, Scherz & Glaw, 2023

Species of frog

Blommersia bara is a species of frog native to Madagascar. The species was first described in 2023, but had been previously encountered and subsequently mistaken for other species in the past. It is named after the Bara people, who live in the same region as the species.

The species is considered to be relatively common and is known to inhabit streams and swamps. Tadpoles of B. bara develop in vernal pools and adults have been observed to display egg-guarding behavior.

== Description ==
The size of Blommersia bara individuals has been observed to vary greatly between regions. The snout–vent length of males ranges from 18.2 to 25.7 mm, while those of females range between 22.0 and 26.4 mm.

Blommersia bara vocalization has been recorded multiple times. Advertisement calls have been found to have a dominant frequency that can range from 4,694 to 6,115 Hz. The call can be described as "short" and "simple". Males, in particular, call frequently during wet seasons.
