= Guibemantis kathrinae =

Conservation status
- Vulnerable (IUCN 3.1)

Scientific classification
- Kingdom: Animalia
- Phylum: Chordata
- Class: Amphibia
- Order: Anura
- Family: Mantellidae
- Genus: Guibemantis
- Species: G. kathrinae

Binomial name
- Guibemantis kathrinae (Glaw, Vences & Gossmann, 2000)

Species of frog

Guibemantis kathrinae is a species of frog in the family Mantellidae. It is endemic to Madagascar. Its natural habitats are subtropical or tropical moist lowland forests, rivers, swamps, freshwater marshes, intermittent freshwater marshes, and heavily degraded former forest. It is threatened by habitat loss.
