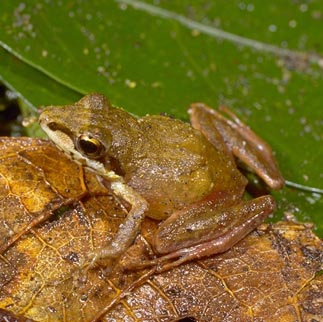

Conservation status
- Least Concern (IUCN 3.1)

Scientific classification
- Kingdom: Animalia
- Phylum: Chordata
- Class: Amphibia
- Order: Anura
- Family: Mantellidae
- Genus: Blommersia
- Species: B. grandisonae

Binomial name
- Blommersia grandisonae (Guibé, 1974)

Synonyms
- Mantidactylus grandisonae Guibé, 1974

= Blommersia grandisonae =

Species of frog

Blommersia grandisonae is a species of frog in the family Mantellidae first described by Jean Marius René Guibé in 1974. It is endemic to Madagascar.

Its natural habitats are subtropical or tropical moist lowland forests, rivers, intermittent freshwater marshes, and plantations.

It is threatened by habitat loss.

== See also ==
- Amphibians of Madagascar

== Sources ==
- IUCN SSC Amphibian Specialist Group (2016). "Blommersia grandisonae". IUCN Red List of Threatened Species: e.T57485A84171980. Retrieved 4 April 2020.
