= Wakea madinika =

Conservation status
- Data Deficient (IUCN 3.1)

Scientific classification
- Kingdom: Animalia
- Phylum: Chordata
- Class: Amphibia
- Order: Anura
- Family: Mantellidae
- Subfamily: Mantellinae
- Genus: Wakea; Glaw & Vences, 2006
- Species: W. madinika

Binomial name
- Wakea madinika (Vences, Andreone, Glaw & Mattioli, 2002)

Synonyms
- Mantidactylus madinika Vences, Andreone, Glaw & Mattioli, 2002

Species of amphibian

Wakea madinika is a species of frog in the mantellid subfamily Mantellinae. It is the only species in the monotypic genus Wakea. It is endemic to Madagascar.

== Discovery ==
Wakea madinika reaches adult sizes of 11–13 mm (0.43–0.51 in) snout-vent length for males and 15–16 mm (0.59–0.63 in) length for females. With these lengths, it is the smallest species in the family Mantellidae.

Although the species was previously only known from a single location (a cacao plantation), during expeditions in 2016, 2019 and 2022 it was also identified from other sites. One site was located >100km from the type locality, in Ankarana Special Reserve; indicating that Wakea madinika should no longer be considered a micro-endemic.

== Taxonomy ==
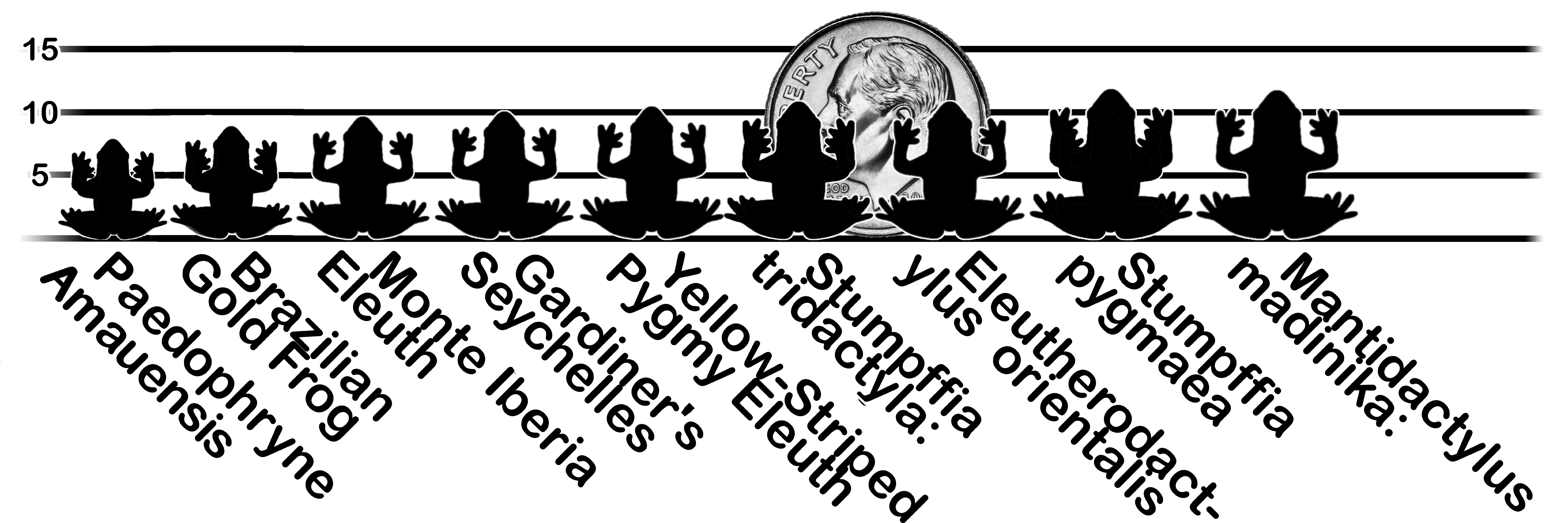
This species was originally described as a member of the genus Mantidactylus, but was transferred to its own genus in 2006.
