= Guibemantis depressiceps =

Conservation status
- Least Concern (IUCN 3.1)

Scientific classification
- Kingdom: Animalia
- Phylum: Chordata
- Class: Amphibia
- Order: Anura
- Family: Mantellidae
- Genus: Guibemantis
- Species: G. depressiceps

Binomial name
- Guibemantis depressiceps (Boulenger, 1882)

Species of frog

Guibemantis depressiceps is a species of frog in the family Mantellidae. Endemic to Madagascar, its natural habitats are subtropical or tropical moist lowland and montane forests, rivers, freshwater marshes, intermittent freshwater marshes, and heavily degraded former forests. It is threatened by habitat loss.
