= Boehmantis =

Conservation status
- Vulnerable (IUCN 3.1)

Scientific classification
- Kingdom: Animalia
- Phylum: Chordata
- Class: Amphibia
- Order: Anura
- Family: Mantellidae
- Genus: Boehmantis; Glaw and Vences, 2006
- Species: B. microtympanum

Binomial name
- Boehmantis microtympanum (Angel, 1935)

Synonyms
- Mantidactylus microtympanum Angel, 1935

Genus of amphibians

Boehmantis is a genus of frogs in the mantellid subfamily Mantellinae. It is monotypic, being represented by a single species, Boehmantis microtympanum. The genus is endemic to Madagascar.

== Taxonomy ==
Boehmantis microtympanum was originally described in the genus Mantidactylus by Fernand Angel. The species was transferred to its own genus, Boehmantis, by Frank Glaw and Miguel Vences. This was justified using molecular data as well as by the lack of femoral glands, which are present in all other species in the subfamily Mantellinae.

== Etymology ==
The generic name honours Wolfgang Böhme, German herpetologist.

== Description ==
Boehmantis microtympanum are relatively large frogs, with adults measuring 40–60 mm (1.6–2.4 in) in snout–vent length. The tympanum is rather indistinct and small. The finger and toe tips bear well-developed discs; the fingers have no webbing whereas the toes are fully webbed. Dorsal skin is smooth. The dorsal colouration varies from olive greenish to—especially in subadults—brown, with lighter or darker indistinct markings. The ventral parts are white, often with dark spots or marblings on the throat and chest.

This species is not known to be able to call.

== Distribution and habitat ==
This species is endemic to southeastern Madagascar and is known from Midongy du sud National Park south to Andohahela National Park. It occurs in pristine and degraded forests, usually in mature ones, with one record from an open area next to a relict forest. It lives in fast-flowing, rocky streams at elevations of 50–1,000 m (160–3,280 ft) above sea level.

== Conservation status ==
Boehmantis microtympanum is currently considered Vulnerable by the IUCN due to its limited range and ongoing habitat destruction. Nevertheless, it is locally common and occurs in two national parks (Midongy du sud and Andohahela) as well as in Tsitongambarika Classified Forest.
