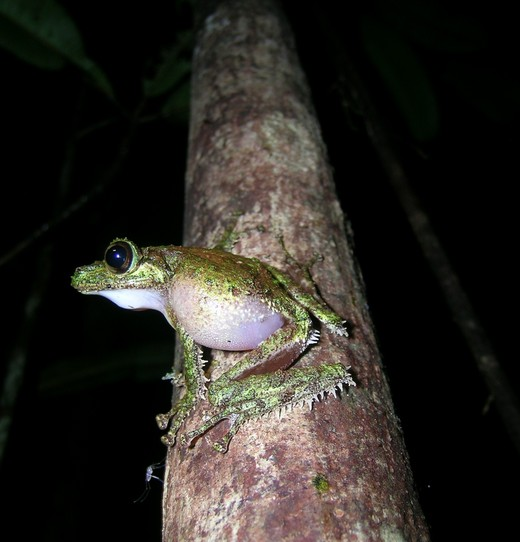
- Spinomantis aglavei

Scientific classification
- Kingdom: Animalia
- Phylum: Chordata
- Class: Amphibia
- Order: Anura
- Family: Mantellidae
- Subfamily: Mantellinae
- Genus: Spinomantis; Dubois, 1992

Type species
- Rhacophorus aglavei Methuen and Hewitt, 1913

Diversity
- 14 species

= Spinomantis =

Genus of amphibians

Spinomantis is a frog genus in the mantellid subfamily Mantellinae. This genus is restricted to Madagascar. At present it contains 13 species. They are arboreal or terrestrial frogs and occur in or along small streams. Most species are nocturnal.

== Taxonomy ==
The genus Spinomantis was erected as a subgenus of Mantidactylus by Dubois in 1992. It was elevated to genus-level in 2006.

== Description ==
Spinomantis are small to medium-sized frogs, with adults measuring 22–60 mm (0.87–2.36 in) in snout–vent length. The toes have rudimentary to moderate webbing. The finger tips are distinctly enlarged. Males have subgular vocal sacs.

== Species ==
There are 16 species:

image	Scientific name	Distribution
	Spinomantis aglavei (Methuen and Hewitt, 1913)	Madagascar
	Spinomantis beckei Vences, Köhler, and Glaw, 2017	south-eastern Madagascar
	Spinomantis bertini (Guibé, 1947)	Madagascar
	Spinomantis brunae (Andreone, Glaw, Vences, and Vallan, 1998)	Madagascar
	Spinomantis chlorostictus Vences, Scherz, Köhler, Ruthmann Jimenez, Andreone, Crottini, Hutter, Petzold, Raselimanana, and Glaw, 2026	Madagascar
	Spinomantis elegans (Guibé, 1974)	Madagascar
	Spinomantis fimbriatus (Glaw and Vences, 1994)	Madagascar
	Spinomantis guibei (Blommers-Schlösser, 1991)	Madagascar
	Spinomantis lakolosy Hutter, Andriampenomanana, Lambert & Vences, 2025	Madagascar
	Spinomantis lavabato Hutter, Andriampenomanana, Lambert & Vences, 2025	Madagascar
	Spinomantis massi (Glaw and Vences, 1994)	Madagascar
	Spinomantis microtis (Guibé, 1974)	Madagascar
	Spinomantis mirus Sabino-Pinto, Rakotoarison, Bletz, Edmonds, Glaw, and Vences, 2019	Madagascar
	Spinomantis nussbaumi Cramer, Rabibisoa, and Raxworthy, 2008	Madagascar (Mahajanga)
	Spinomantis peraccae (Boulenger, 1896)	Madagascar
	Spinomantis phantasticus (Glaw and Vences, 1997)	northeastern Madagascar
	Spinomantis tavaratra Cramer, Rabibisoa, and Raxworthy, 2008	northwestern Madagascar
