= Guibemantis tornieri =

Conservation status
- Least Concern (IUCN 3.1)

Scientific classification
- Kingdom: Animalia
- Phylum: Chordata
- Class: Amphibia
- Order: Anura
- Family: Mantellidae
- Genus: Guibemantis
- Species: G. tornieri

Binomial name
- Guibemantis tornieri (Ahl, 1928)

Synonyms
- Rhacophorus tornieri Ahl, 1928; Boophis tornieri Guibé, 1947; Mantidactylus tornieri Blommers-Schlösser, 1978; Mantidactylus (Guibemantis) tornieri Dubois, 1992

Species of frog

Guibemantis tornieri is a species of frog in the family Mantellidae. It is endemic to Madagascar. Its natural habitats are subtropical or tropical moist lowland forests, subtropical or tropical moist montane forests, freshwater marshes, intermittent freshwater marshes, and heavily degraded former forest. It is threatened by habitat loss.
