= Blommersia kely =

Conservation status
- Least Concern (IUCN 3.1)

Scientific classification
- Kingdom: Animalia
- Phylum: Chordata
- Class: Amphibia
- Order: Anura
- Family: Mantellidae
- Genus: Blommersia
- Species: B. kely

Binomial name
- Blommersia kely (Glaw & Vences, 1994)

Synonyms
- Mantidactylus kely Glaw & Vences, 1994

Species of frog

Blommersia kely is a species of frog in the family Mantellidae. It is endemic to Madagascar. Its natural habitats are subtropical or tropical moist montane forests, moist savanna, subtropical or tropical high-altitude grassland, swamps, and heavily degraded former forest. It is threatened by habitat loss.
