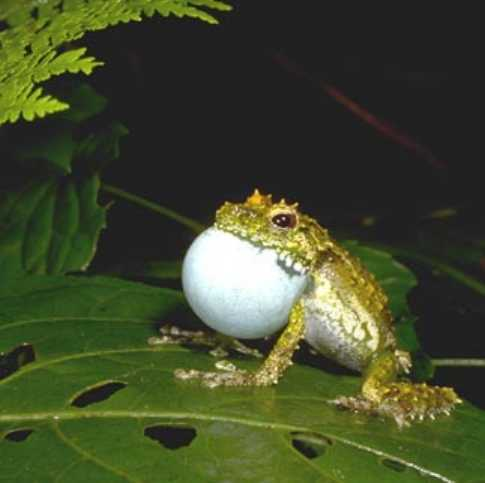

Conservation status
- Least Concern (IUCN 3.1)

Scientific classification
- Kingdom: Animalia
- Phylum: Chordata
- Class: Amphibia
- Order: Anura
- Family: Mantellidae
- Genus: Spinomantis
- Species: S. phantasticus

Binomial name
- Spinomantis phantasticus (Glaw and Vences, 1997)

Synonyms
- Mantidactylus (Spinomantis) phantasticus Glaw and Vences, 1997

= Spinomantis phantasticus =

Species of frog

Spinomantis phantasticus is a species of frog in the family Mantellidae. It is endemic to east-central and northeastern Madagascar.

== Description ==
Spinomantis phantasticus males measure 36–38 mm (1.4–1.5 in) in snout–vent length. It is a very conspicuous species, presenting a distinct green-brown dorsal patterning and large spines all over the body. The ventral side as well as the femoral glands are greenish.

The male advertisement call is a sequence of 4 or 5 "metallic" double-click notes.

== Habitat and conservation ==
Scpinomantis brunae occur along brooks in pristine forests at elevations of 500–1,200 m (1,600–3,900 ft) above sea level. It probably breeds in streams, as other species in the genus. Males call from about 2–4 m above the ground in the vegetation along streams.

This species is locally abundant. However, subsistence agriculture, timber extraction, charcoal manufacture, spread of invasive eucalyptus, livestock grazing, and expanding human settlements are threats to its habitat. It occurs in the Masoala and Marojejy National Parks.
