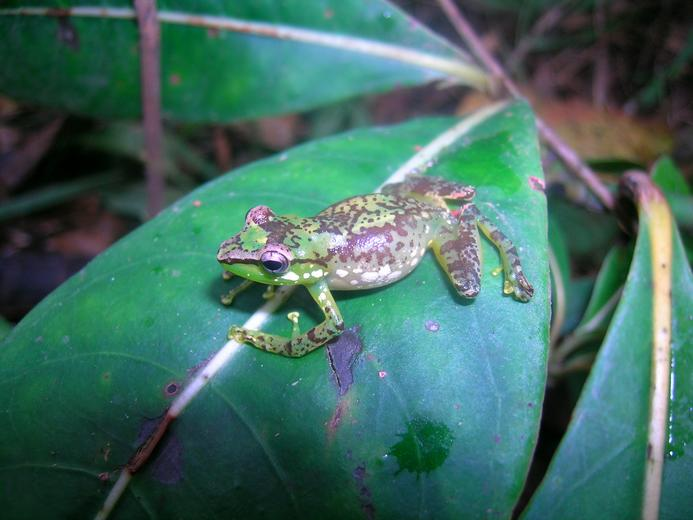

Conservation status
- Least Concern (IUCN 3.1)

Scientific classification
- Kingdom: Animalia
- Phylum: Chordata
- Class: Amphibia
- Order: Anura
- Family: Mantellidae
- Genus: Guibemantis
- Species: G. liber

Binomial name
- Guibemantis liber (Peracca, 1893)

= Guibemantis liber =

Species of frog

Guibemantis liber is a species of frog in the family Mantellidae. It is endemic to Madagascar. Its natural habitats are subtropical or tropical moist lowland forests, subtropical or tropical moist montane forests, swamps, and heavily degraded former forest. It is threatened by habitat loss.
