= Blommersia sarotra =

Conservation status
- Least Concern (IUCN 3.1)

Scientific classification
- Kingdom: Animalia
- Phylum: Chordata
- Class: Amphibia
- Order: Anura
- Family: Mantellidae
- Genus: Blommersia
- Species: B. sarotra

Binomial name
- Blommersia sarotra (Glaw & Vences, 2002)

Synonyms
- Mantidactylus sarotra Glaw & Vences, 2002

Species of amphibian

Blommersia sarotra is a species of frogs in the family Mantellidae.

It is endemic to Madagascar. Its natural habitats are subtropical or tropical moist lowland forests, subtropical or tropical swamps, subtropical or tropical moist montane forests, swamps, and heavily degraded former forest. It is threatened by habitat loss.

== Species Characteristics ==
Blommersia sarotra sustain typical characteristics of a single subgular vocal sac, short hands, and an elongated head like most other species in the Blommersia genus. However, the distinguishing traits of the species Blommersia sarotra include the presence of a white mark on their throats, lack of vomerine teeth, and a unique mating call composed of a long pulsed note, followed by clicking.

== Sources ==
- Glaw, F. R. A. N. K; M., Veneces (2002). "A new sibling species of the anuran subgenus Blommersia from Madagascar (Amphibia: Mantellidae: Mantidactylus) and its molecular phylogenetic relationships". Herpetological journal. 12.1: 11–20 – via Science Citation Index [SCI] - ISI Web of Knowledge.
