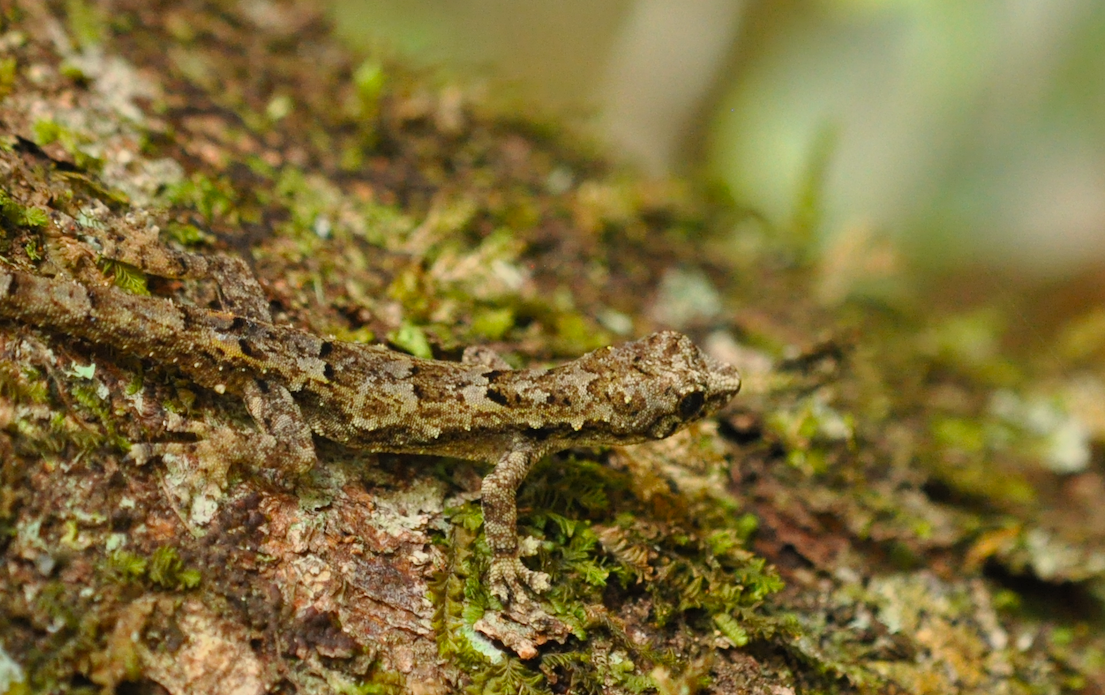

Conservation status
- Near Threatened (IUCN 3.1)

Scientific classification
- Kingdom: Animalia
- Phylum: Chordata
- Class: Reptilia
- Order: Squamata
- Suborder: Gekkota
- Family: Gekkonidae
- Genus: Lygodactylus
- Species: L. guibei

Binomial name
- Lygodactylus guibei G. Pasteur, 1965
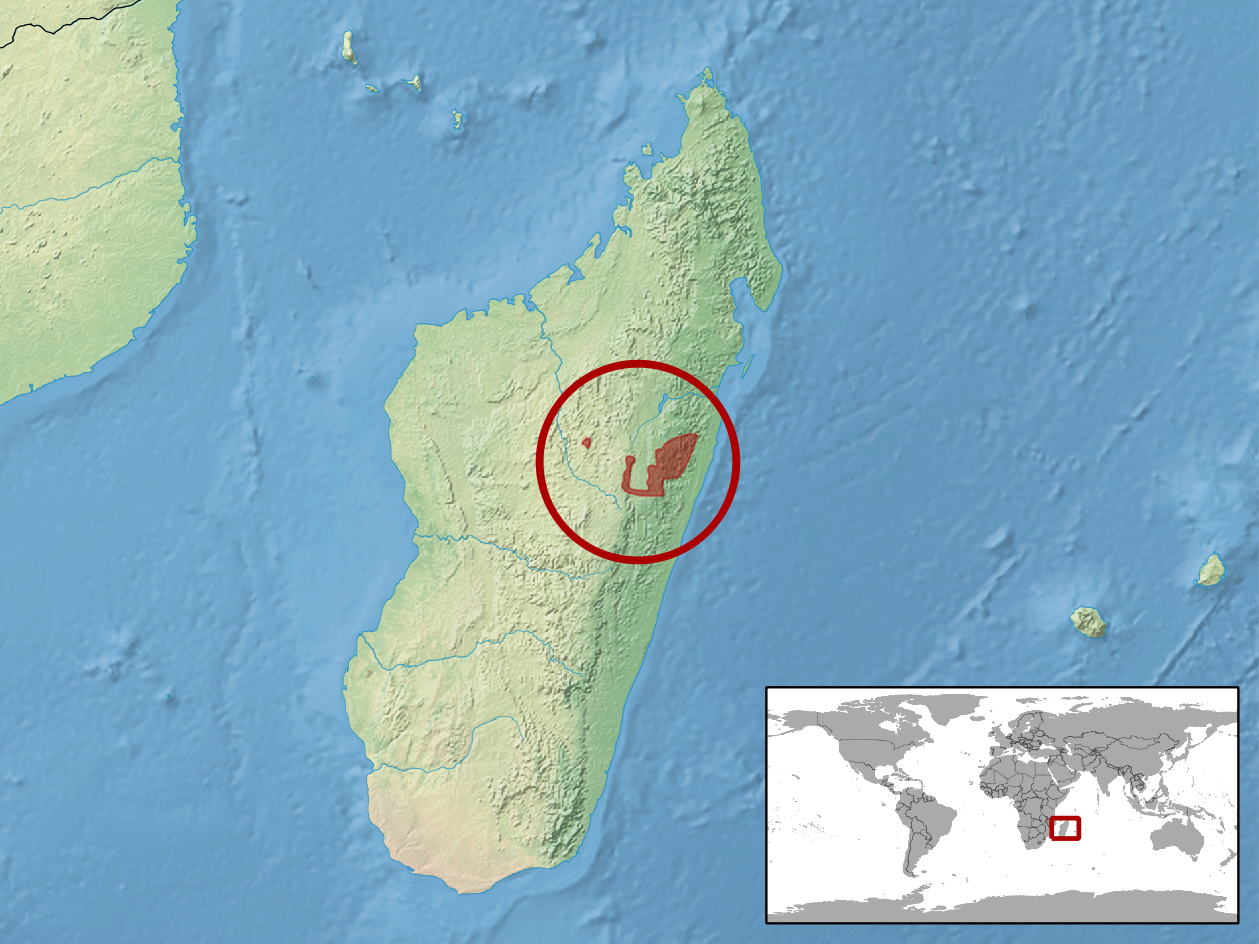

= Western dwarf gecko =

Species of lizard

The western dwarf gecko (Lygodactylus guibei), also known commonly as Guibé's dwarf day gecko, is a small species of gecko, a lizard in the family Gekkonidae. The species is endemic to Madagascar.

== Etymology ==
The specific name, guibei, is in honor of French herpetologist Jean Marius René Guibé.

== Habitat ==
The preferred natural habitat of L. guibei is forest, at altitudes of 500–1,500 m (1,600–4,900 ft).

== Reproduction ==
L. guibei is oviparous.
