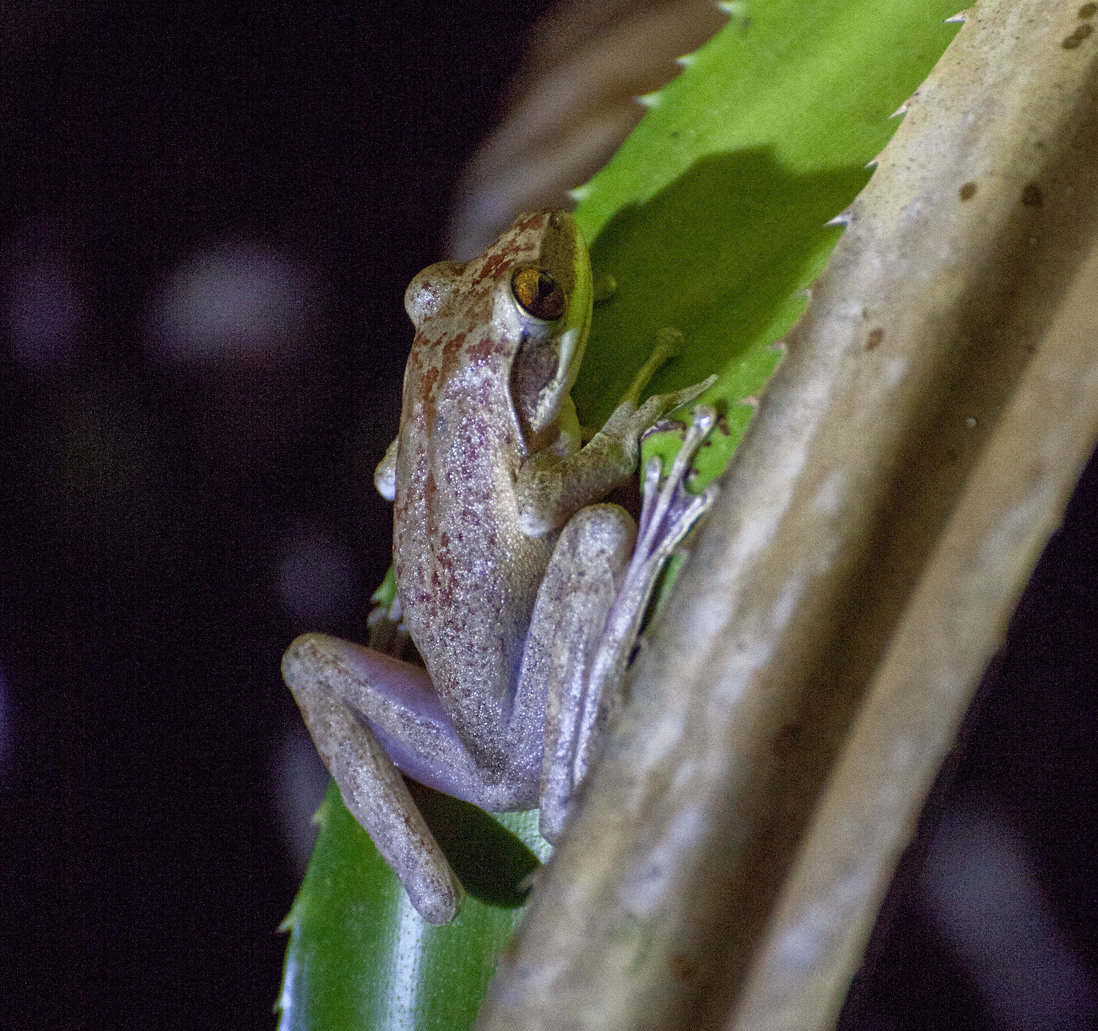

Conservation status
- Least Concern (IUCN 3.1)

Scientific classification
- Kingdom: Animalia
- Phylum: Chordata
- Class: Amphibia
- Order: Anura
- Family: Mantellidae
- Genus: Guibemantis
- Species: G. timidus

Binomial name
- Guibemantis timidus (Vences & Glaw, 2005)

= Guibemantis timidus =

Species of frog

Guibemantis timidus is a species of frog in the family Mantellidae. It is endemic to Madagascar. Its natural habitats are subtropical or tropical moist lowland forests, freshwater marshes, intermittent freshwater marshes, and heavily degraded former forest.
