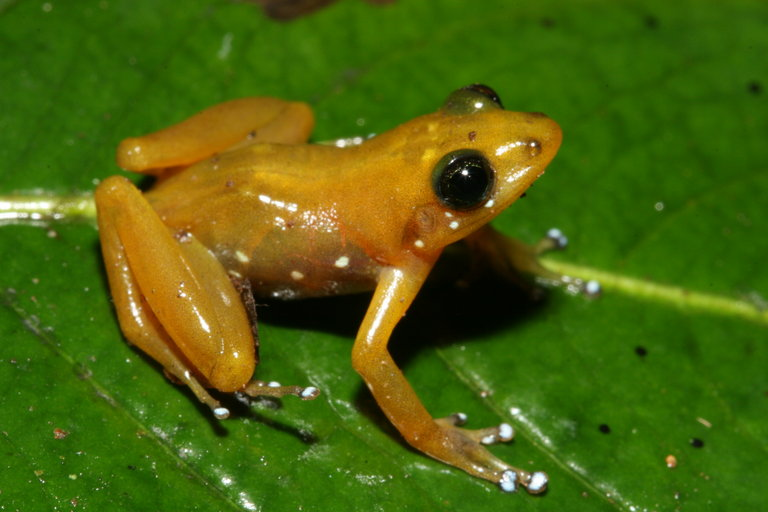
- Blommersia angolafa

Scientific classification
- Kingdom: Animalia
- Phylum: Chordata
- Class: Amphibia
- Order: Anura
- Family: Mantellidae
- Subfamily: Mantellinae
- Genus: Blommersia; Dubois, 1992

Type species
- Gephyromantis blommersae Guibé, 1975

Diversity
- 11 species

= Blommersia =

Genus of amphibians

Blommersia is a genus of frogs in the mantellid subfamily Mantellinae. This genus is restricted to Madagascar. At present it contains 11 species. It was formerly a subgenus of the genus Mantidactylus but was elevated to genus-level in 2006.

== Species ==
Image	Scientific name	Distribution
	Blommersia angolafa Andreone, Rosa, Noël, Crottini, Vences, and Raxworthy, 2010	eastern Madagascar
	Blommersia bara Vences, Multzsch, Köhler, Crottini, Andreone, Rakotoarison, Scherz & Glaw, 2023	Madagascar
	Blommersia blommersae (Guibé, 1975)	Madagascar
	Blommersia dejongi Vences, Köhler, Pabijan, and Glaw, 2010	Madagascar
	Blommersia domerguei (Guibé, 1974)	Madagascar
	Blommersia galani Vences, Köhler, Pabijan, and Glaw, 2010	east coast of Madagascar
	Blommersia grandisonae (Guibé, 1974)	Madagascar
	Blommersia kely (Glaw and Vences, 1994)	Madagascar
	Blommersia sarotra (Glaw and Vences, 2002)	Madagascar
	Blommersia transmarina Glaw, Hawlitschek, Glaw K., and Vences, 2019	Comoros Islands
	Blommersia variabilis Pabijan, Gehring, Köhler, Glaw, and Vences, 2011	north-eastern Madagascar
	Blommersia wittei (Guibé, 1974)	Madagascar
