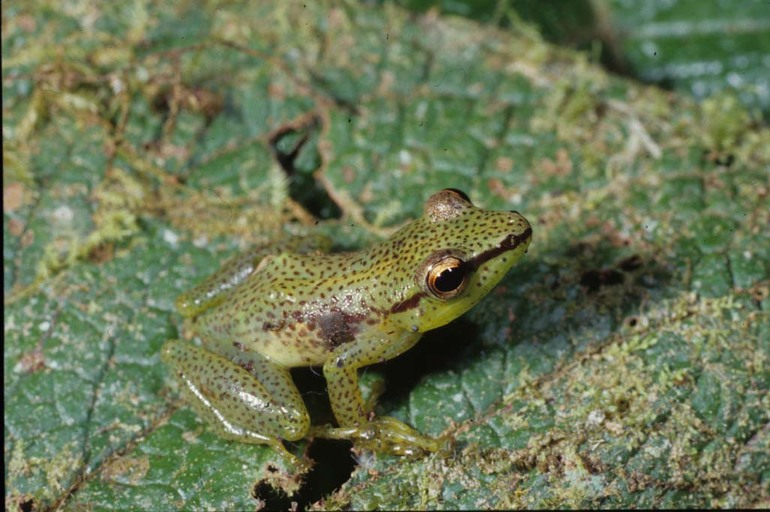

Conservation status
- Critically Endangered (IUCN 3.1)

Scientific classification
- Kingdom: Animalia
- Phylum: Chordata
- Class: Amphibia
- Order: Anura
- Family: Mantellidae
- Genus: Guibemantis
- Species: G. punctatus

Binomial name
- Guibemantis punctatus (Blommers-Schlösser, 1979)

= Guibemantis punctatus =

Species of frog

Guibemantis punctatus is a species of frog in the family Mantellidae. It is endemic to Madagascar. Its natural habitats are subtropical or tropical moist lowland forests, subtropical or tropical moist montane forests, and heavily degraded former forest. It is threatened by habitat loss.
