= Rose Marie Antoinette Blommers-Schlösser =

Dutch herpetologist and entomologist

Rose Marie Antoinette Blommers‑Schlösser
- Born: 1944 (age 81–82); Eindhoven, The Netherlands
- Education: University of Amsterdam
- Scientific career
- Fields: Herpetology; entomology
- Thesis: Biosystematics of Malagasy frogs (1980)

Rose Marie Antoinette Blommers-Schlösser (Eindhoven, 1944) is a Dutch herpetologist and entomologist.

== Life and research ==
Blommers-Schlösser conducted her PhD at the University of Amsterdam on the systematics of the frogs of Madagascar. Together with numerous other herpetologists, especially Charles P. Blanc, she described numerous species of frogs from Madagascar, including Mantidactylus spiniferus, Boophis reticulatus, Spinomantis guibei, and Guibemantis punctatus, and contributed extensively to the knowledge of these and other species. She contributed particularly significantly to understanding of the reproductive behaviour of numerous microhylids from Madagascar, and supraspecific taxonomy of the Mantellidae. She also contributed to the literature on the karyotypes of phytoseiid mites of Madagascar in 1975.

== Matronyms ==
The frog genus Blommersia, and the species Blommersia blommersae and Boophis blommersae, were named in honour of Blommers-Schlösser, in recognition of her contributions to the herpetology of Madagascar.
