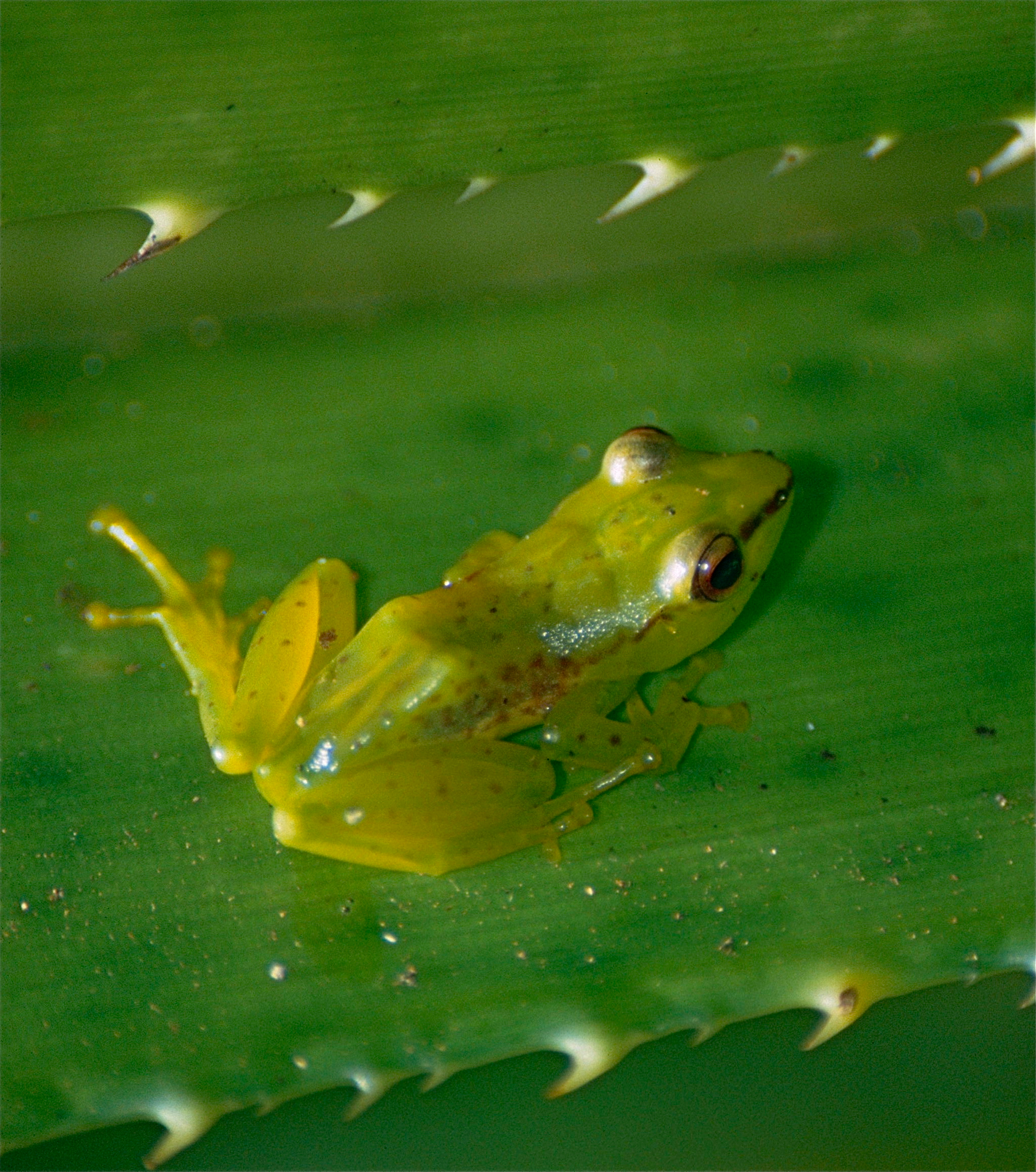
- Guibemantis pulcher

Scientific classification
- Kingdom: Animalia
- Phylum: Chordata
- Class: Amphibia
- Order: Anura
- Family: Mantellidae
- Subfamily: Mantellinae
- Genus: Guibemantis; Dubois, 1992

Type species
- Rhacophorus depressiceps Boulenger, 1882

Diversity
- 25 species in two subgenera

= Guibemantis =

Genus of amphibians

Guibemantis is a frog genus in the mantellid subfamily Mantellinae. This genus is restricted to Madagascar. At present it contains 25 species divided into two subgenera.

== Taxonomy ==
The genus Guibemantis was erected as a subgenus of Mantidactylus by Dubois in 1992 with the type species Guibemantis depressiceps. It was elevated to genus-level in 2006.

In 1994, the subgenus Pandanusicola was erected for a group of species that are strongly associated with Pandanus screw-palms. It was originally proposed as an additional subgenus of Mantidactylus, but when Guibemantis was elevated to genus-level in 2006, Pandanusicola was made a subgenus of it.

== Species ==
This genus is divided into two subgenera:

- Guibemantis Dubois, 1992

- Guibemantis depressiceps (Boulenger, 1882)
- Guibemantis kathrinae (Glaw, Vences, and Gossmann, 2000)
- Guibemantis timidus (Vences and Glaw, 2005)
- Guibemantis tornieri (Ahl, 1928)

- Pandanusicola Glaw & Vences, 1994

- Guibemantis albolineatus (Blommers-Schlösser and Blanc, 1991)
- Guibemantis albomaculatus (Lehtinen, Glaw, Vences, Rakotoarison & Scherz, 2018)
- Guibemantis ambakoana (Gabriel, Rothe, Kohler, Rakotomanga, Edmonds, Galan, Glaw, Lehtinen, Rakotoarison & Vences, 2024)
- Guibemantis annulatus (Lehtinen, Glaw, and Vences, 2011)
- Guibemantis bicalcaratus (Boettger, 1913)
- Guibemantis diphonus (Vences, Jovanovic, Safarek, Glaw, and Köhler, 2015)
- Guibemantis flavobrunneus (Blommers-Schlösser, 1979)
- Guibemantis fotsitenda(Koppetsch, Pabijan, Hutter, Köhler, Gehring, Rakotoarison, Ratsoavina, Scherz, Vieites, Glaw & Vences, 2023)
- Guibemantis liber (Peracca, 1893)
- Guibemantis methueni (Angel, 1929)
- Guibemantis milingilingy (Bletz, Scherz, Rakotoarison, Lehtinen, Glaw & Vences, 2018)
- Guibemantis pulcher (Boulenger, 1882)
- Guibemantis pulcherrimus (Vences, Hutter, Glaw, Rakotoarison, Raselimanana & Scherz, 2023)
- Guibemantis punctatus (Blommers-Schlösser, 1979)
- Guibemantis razandry (Koppetsch, Pabijan, Hutter, Köhler, Gehring, Rakotoarison, Ratsoavina, Scherz, Vieites, Glaw & Vences, 2023
- Guibemantis razoky Koppetsch, Pabijan, Hutter, Köhler, Gehring, Rakotoarison, Ratsoavina, Scherz, Vieites, Glaw & Vences, 2023
- Guibemantis rianasoa (Gabriel, Rothe, Kohler, Rakotomanga, Edmonds, Galan, Glaw, Lehtinen, Rakotoarison & Vences, 2024)
- Guibemantis tasifotsy (Lehtinen, Glaw, Andreone, Pabijan, and Vences, 2012)
- Guibemantis vakoa, (Gabriel, Rothe, Kohler, Rakotomanga, Edmonds, Galan, Glaw, Lehtinen, Rakotoarison & Vences, 2024)
- Guibemantis wattersoni (Lehtinen, Glaw, and Vences, 2011)
- Guibemantis woosteri (Lehtinen, Glaw, Vences, Rakotoarison & Scherz, 2018)
