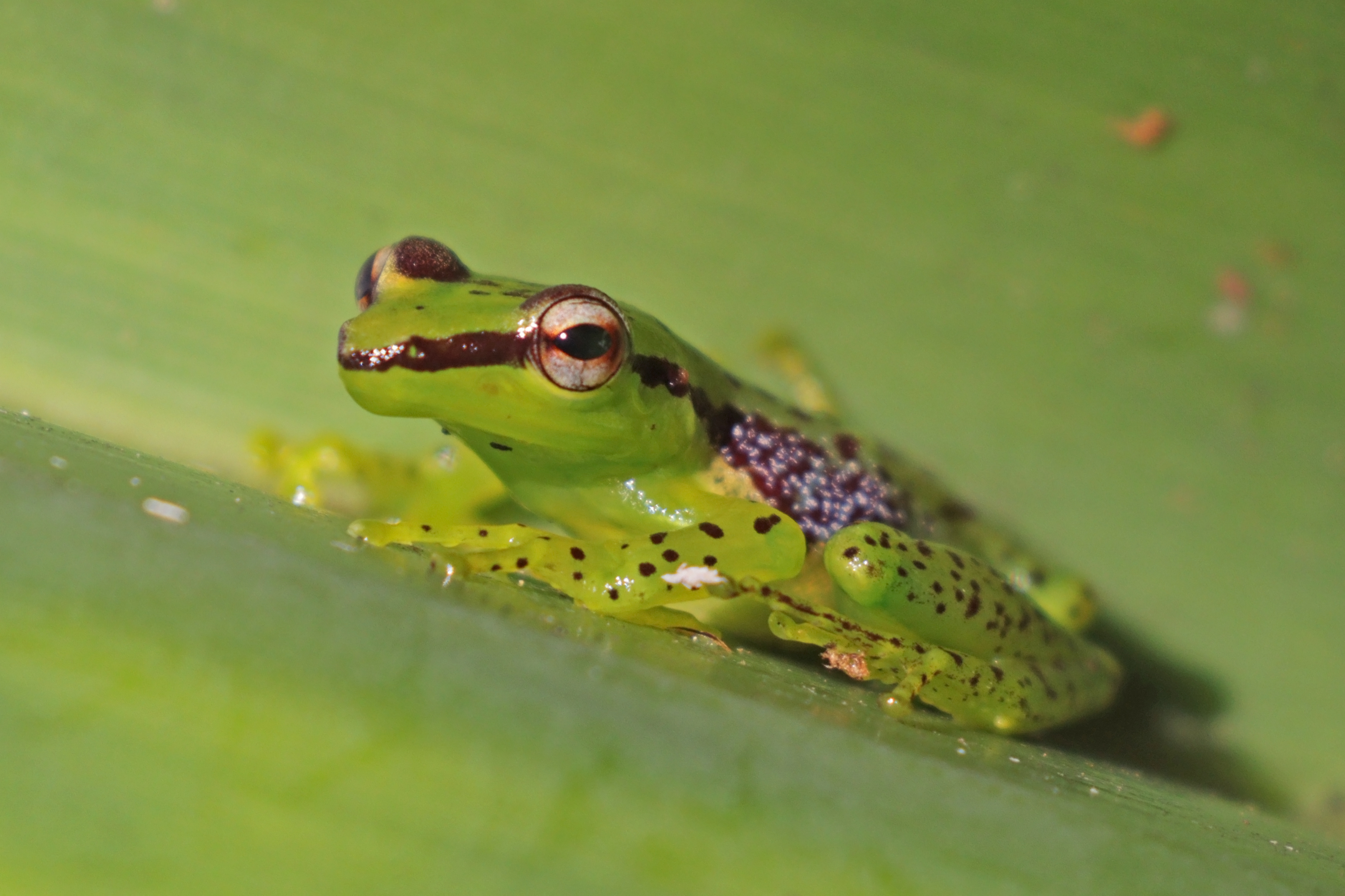

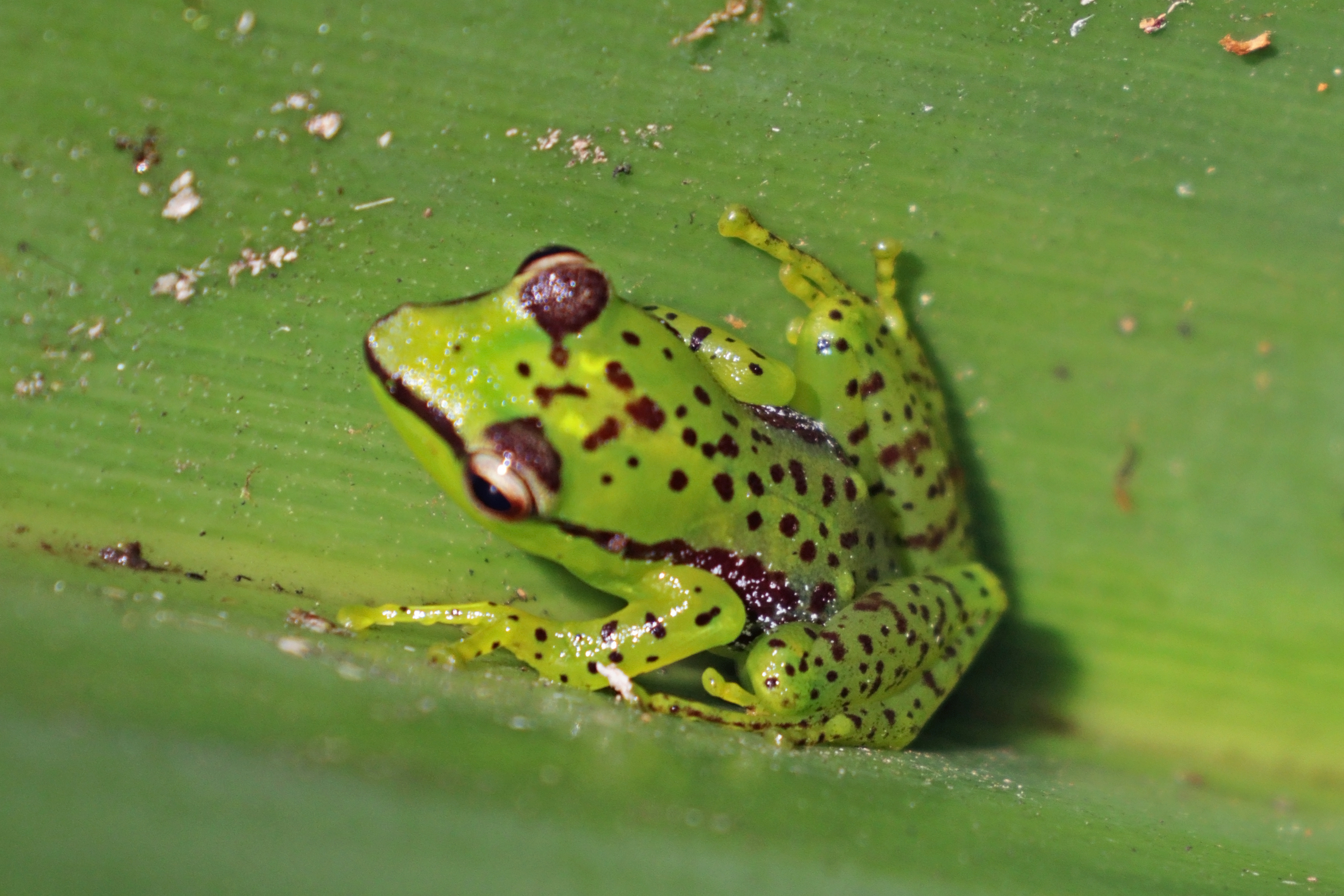
- Ranomafana National Park

Conservation status
- Least Concern (IUCN 3.1)

Scientific classification
- Kingdom: Animalia
- Phylum: Chordata
- Class: Amphibia
- Order: Anura
- Family: Mantellidae
- Genus: Guibemantis
- Species: G. pulcher

Binomial name
- Guibemantis pulcher (Boulenger, 1882)

= Guibemantis pulcher =

Species of frog

Guibemantis pulcher is a species of frog in the family Mantellidae. It is endemic to Madagascar. Its natural habitats are subtropical or tropical moist lowland forests, subtropical or tropical swamps, subtropical or tropical moist montane forests, and heavily degraded former forest. It is threatened by habitat loss.

== Related pages ==
- Amphibians of Madagascar
