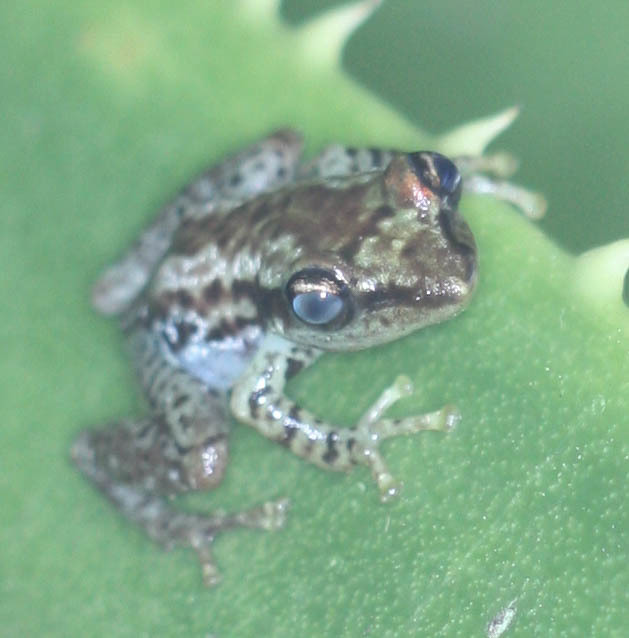

Conservation status
- Least Concern (IUCN 3.1)

Scientific classification
- Kingdom: Animalia
- Phylum: Chordata
- Class: Amphibia
- Order: Anura
- Family: Mantellidae
- Genus: Guibemantis
- Species: G. bicalcaratus

Binomial name
- Guibemantis bicalcaratus (Boettger, 1913)

= Guibemantis bicalcaratus =

Species of frog

Guibemantis bicalcaratus is a species of frog in the family Mantellidae. It is endemic to Madagascar. Its natural habitats are subtropical or tropical moist lowland forests, subtropical or tropical moist montane forests, and plantations . It is threatened by habitat loss.

== Description ==
Guibemantis bicalcaratus measures from 22 to 26 mm in length for males, and 24 to 29 mm for females. Its back is clear-brown to yellowish, with small dark spots and sometimes a clear line on each side of the back. A brown line is often present from the snout to the eardrum. Its belly is uniformly clear.

== Sources ==
- Nussbaum, R. & Raxworthy, C. 2004. Mantidactylus bicalcaratus. 2006 IUCN Red List of Threatened Species. Downloaded on 23 July 2007.
