= Jean Marius René Guibé =

French naturalist (1910–1999)

Jean Marius René Guibé was a French naturalist, especially a herpetologist. He was born on 18 February 1910 in Paris and died on 4 May 1999 in Caen. He was professor at the Paris National Museum of Natural History.

The frogs Boophis guibei, Mantidactylus guibei and Ptychadena guibei, the chameleon Calumma guibei, the gecko Lygodactylus guibei, and the snake Oxyrhopus guibei were named in his honor.

The genus Guibemantis, which includes several species of frogs that are endemic to Madagascar, was also named in honor of Jean Guibé.

== Biographical reference ==
- Bour, Roger (2006). "Professeur Jean Guibe (1910–1999) : biographie et bibliographie". Alytes 24: 133–146. (in French).

== See also ==
- Category:Taxa named by Jean Marius René Guibé

== Bibliography ==
In French :

- Guibé J (1958). Les poissons. (co-authored with Hans Hvass). Paris: Fernand Nathan. 111 pp.
- Guibé J (1959). Les plus beaux reptiles. Paris: Larousse. 96 pp.
- Guibé J (1962). Les reptiles. Paris: Presses Universitaires de France. 124 pp.
- Guibé J (1965). Les batraciens. Paris: Presses Universitaires de France. 125 pp.
- Guibé J (1978). Les batraciens de Madagascar. 222 pp.
