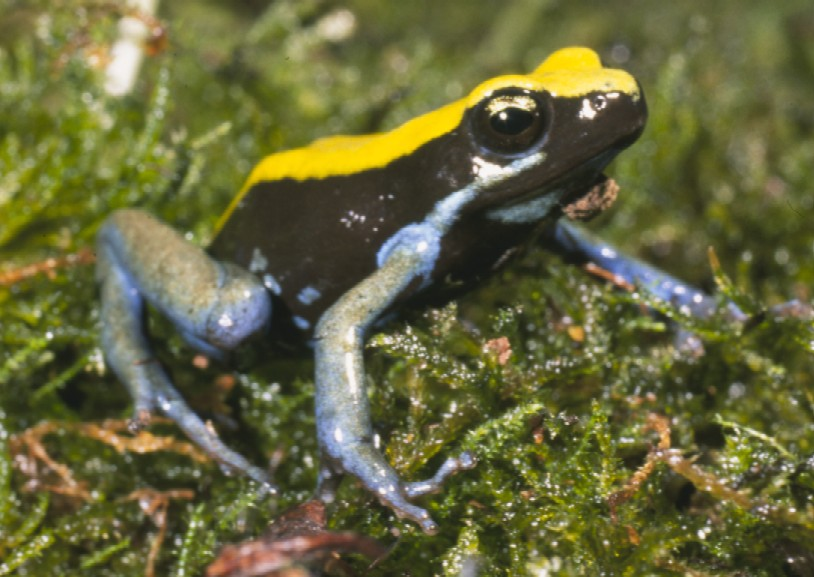
- Blue-legged mantella, Mantella expectata

Scientific classification
- Kingdom: Animalia
- Phylum: Chordata
- Class: Amphibia
- Order: Anura
- Family: Mantellidae
- Subfamily: Mantellinae; Laurent, 1946

Genera
- Blommersia; Boehmantis; Gephyromantis; Guibemantis; Mantella; Mantidactylus; Spinomantis; Tsingymantis; Wakea

= Mantellinae =

Subfamily of amphibians

Mantellinae is a subfamily of frogs in the family Mantellidae. These frogs are native to Madagascar and Mayotte. The species vary in size from under 25 mm (e.g. some species of Blommersia) to over 100 mm (e.g. Mantidactylus guttulatus). The subfamily is most famous for the genus Mantella, which contains species that superficially resemble poison dart frogs of the tropical Americas, and have converged on similar aposematic colouration and toxins. As of 2 May 2016, there are 128 described species in this subfamily, but several more are described each year.

== Systematics ==
Historically only two genera were recognized within the Mantellinae: Mantella and Mantidactylus. Several subgenera were recognized within the genus Mantidactylus. These were elevated to genus level in 2006 and are now universally accepted. These are Blommersia, Boehmantis, Gephyromantis, Guibemantis, Spinomantis, and Wakea. Tsingymantis is also often considered a member of this subfamily.
