= Mantidactylus radaka =

Scientific classification
- Kingdom: Animalia
- Phylum: Chordata
- Class: Amphibia
- Order: Anura
- Family: Mantellidae
- Genus: Mantidactylus
- Species: M. radaka

Binomial name
- Mantidactylus radaka Rancilhac et al., 2020

Species of frog

Mantidactylus radaka is a species of frog in the family Mantellidae. It is endemic to Madagascar. It was described in 2020 by an international team of scientists, who differentiated it from M. guttulatus and M. grandidieri via molecular data from wild and museum specimens.

The specific name is based on the Malagasy word for "large frog" (as opposed to sahona, "small frog"), which is often used as a common name for the species. It is frequently hunted and eaten by local people.

Its natural habitats are calm, shallow streams in rainforests. Its conservation status has not yet been evaluated by the IUCN.
