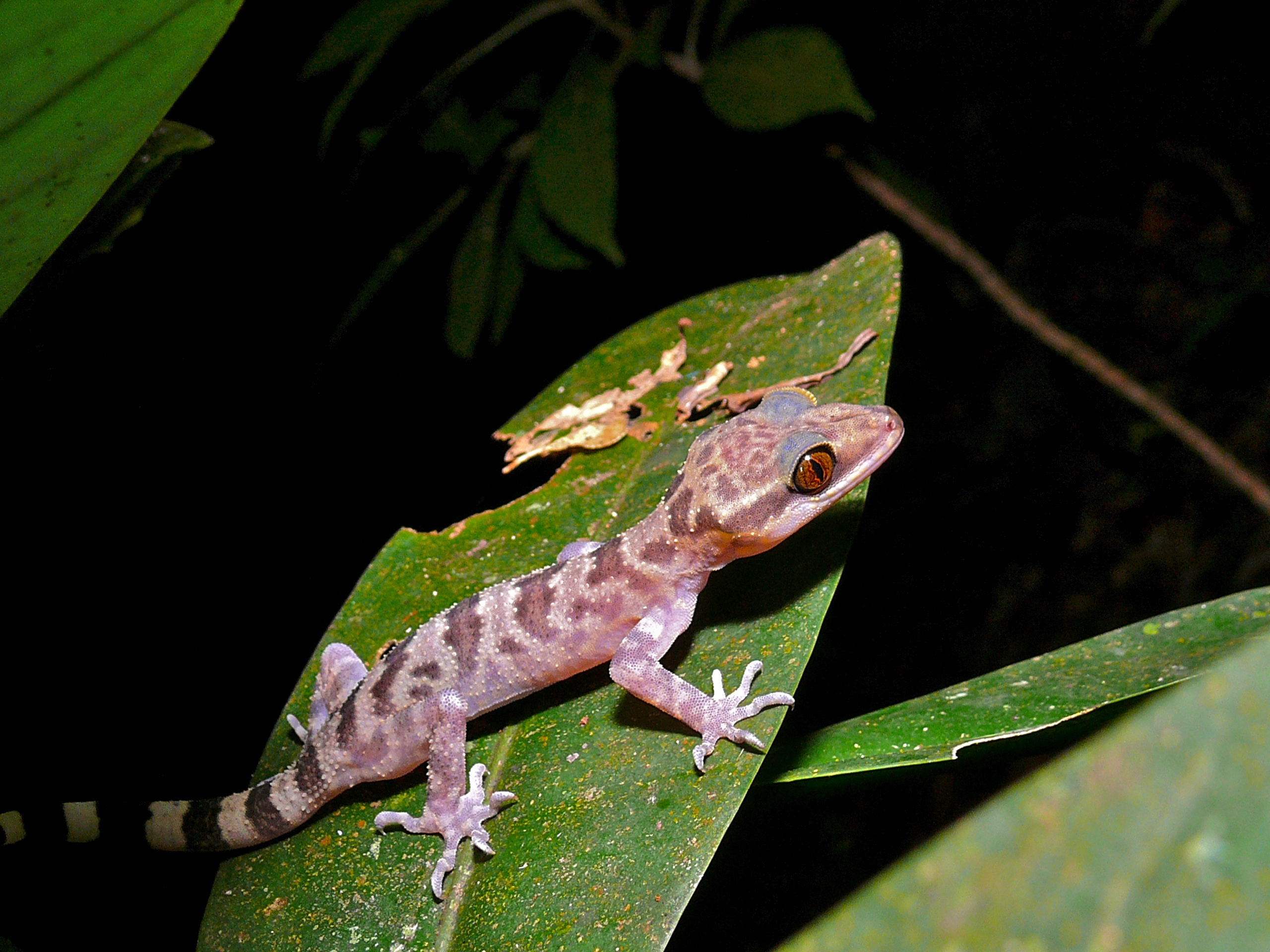

Conservation status
- Least Concern (IUCN 3.1)

Scientific classification
- Kingdom: Animalia
- Phylum: Chordata
- Class: Reptilia
- Order: Squamata
- Suborder: Gekkota
- Family: Gekkonidae
- Genus: Cyrtodactylus
- Species: C. baluensis

Binomial name
- Cyrtodactylus baluensis (Mocquard, 1890)

Synonyms
- Gymnodactylus baluensis Mocquard, 1890; Gonydactylus baluensis (Mocquard, 1890)

= Balu bow-fingered gecko =

Species of lizard

The Balu bow-fingered gecko or Besar Island bent-toed gecko (Cyrtodactylus baluensis) is a species of gecko endemic to Borneo. It is known from Brunei, Sarawak and Sabah (Malaysia), and East Kalimantan (Indonesia).
