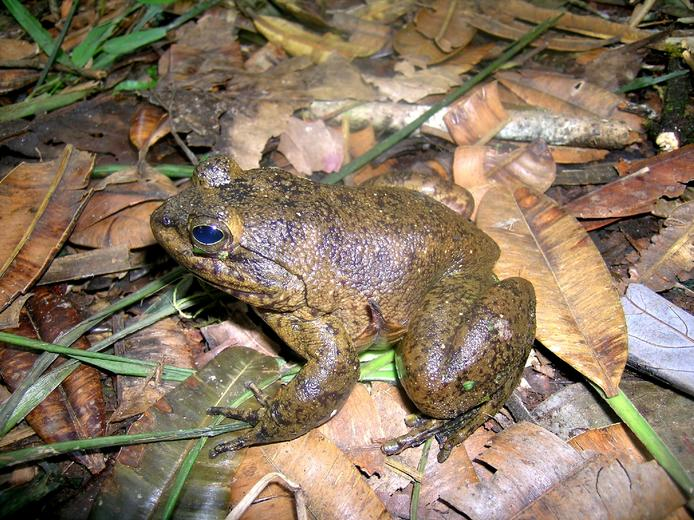
- Mantidactylus guttulatus, the type species of Mantidactylus

Scientific classification
- Kingdom: Animalia
- Phylum: Chordata
- Class: Amphibia
- Order: Anura
- Family: Mantellidae
- Subfamily: Mantellinae
- Genus: Mantidactylus; Boulenger, 1895

Type species
- Rana guttulata Boulenger, 1881

Diversity
- 58 species in six subgenera

= Mantidactylus =

Genus of amphibians

Mantidactylus is a frog genus in the mantellid subfamily Mantellinae. This genus is restricted to Madagascar. The genus is divided into several subgenera that form monophyletic genetic clusters and are ecologically similar.

== Taxonomy ==
Mantidactylus was erected by Boulenger in 1895 with the type species Rana guttulata. For a long time the genus contained a wide variety of mostly terrestrial Madagascan frogs, that were divided into species groups and/or subgenera. Several of these groups were subsequently erected to genus level: Blommersia, Boehmantis, Gephyromantis, Guibemantis, Spinomantis and Wakea. Today, six subgenera remain within the genus Mantidactylus:

- Mantidactylus Boulenger, 1895
- Hylobatrachus Laurent, 1943
- Brygoomantis Dubois, 1992
- Ochthomantis Glaw & Vences, 1994
- Chonomantis Glaw & Vences, 1994
- Maitsomantis Glaw & Vences, 2006

== Species ==
New species of Mantidactylus are described at a rate of a few per year on average. The following list contains all described species as of 6 January 2023, arranged by subgenus:

- Mantidactylus

- Mantidactylus guttulatus Boulenger, 1881
- Mantidactylus grandidieri Mocquard, 1895
- Mantidactylus radaka Rancilhac, Bruy, Scherz, Pereira, Preick, Straube, Lyra, Ohler, Streicher, Andreone, Crottini, Hutter, Randrianantoandro, Rakotoarison, Glaw, Hofreiter & Vences, 2020

- Brygoomantis

- Mantidactylus ulcerosus Boettger, 1880
- Mantidactylus bellyi Mocquard, 1895
- Mantidactylus noralottae Mercurio & Andreone, 2007
- Mantidactylus betsileanus (Boulenger, 1882)
- Mantidactylus inaudax (Peracca, 1893)
- Mantidactylus tripunctatus Angel, 1930
- Mantidactylus curtus (Boulenger, 1882)
- Mantidactylus ambohimitombi Boulenger, 1919
- Mantidactylus bourgati Guibé, 1974
- Mantidactylus madecassus (Millot & Guibé, 1950)
- Mantidactylus pauliani Guibé, 1974
- Mantidactylus alutus (Peracca, 1893)
- Mantidactylus biporus (Boulenger, 1889)
- Mantidactylus tricinctus (Guibé, 1947)
- Mantidactylus schulzi Vences, Hildenbrand, Warmuth, Andreone & Glaw, 2018
- Mantidactylus mahery Scherz, Crottini, Hutter, Hildenbrand, Andreone, Fulgence, Köhler, Ndriantsoa, Ohler, Preick, Rakotoarison, Rancilhac, Raselimanana, Riemann, Rödel, Rosa, Streicher, Vieites, Köhler, Hofreiter, Glaw & Vences, 2022
- Mantidactylus steinfartzi Scherz, Crottini, Hutter, Hildenbrand, Andreone, Fulgence, Köhler, Ndriantsoa, Ohler, Preick, Rakotoarison, Rancilhac, Raselimanana, Riemann, Rödel, Rosa, Streicher, Vieites, Köhler, Hofreiter, Glaw & Vences, 2022
- Mantidactylus incognitus Scherz, Crottini, Hutter, Hildenbrand, Andreone, Fulgence, Köhler, Ndriantsoa, Ohler, Preick, Rakotoarison, Rancilhac, Raselimanana, Riemann, Rödel, Rosa, Streicher, Vieites, Köhler, Hofreiter, Glaw & Vences, 2022
- Mantidactylus jonasi Scherz, Crottini, Hutter, Hildenbrand, Andreone, Fulgence, Köhler, Ndriantsoa, Ohler, Preick, Rakotoarison, Rancilhac, Raselimanana, Riemann, Rödel, Rosa, Streicher, Vieites, Köhler, Hofreiter, Glaw & Vences, 2022
- Mantidactylus katae Scherz, Crottini, Hutter, Hildenbrand, Andreone, Fulgence, Köhler, Ndriantsoa, Ohler, Preick, Rakotoarison, Rancilhac, Raselimanana, Riemann, Rödel, Rosa, Streicher, Vieites, Köhler, Hofreiter, Glaw & Vences, 2022
- Mantidactylus kortei Scherz, Crottini, Hutter, Hildenbrand, Andreone, Fulgence, Köhler, Ndriantsoa, Ohler, Preick, Rakotoarison, Rancilhac, Raselimanana, Riemann, Rödel, Rosa, Streicher, Vieites, Köhler, Hofreiter, Glaw & Vences, 2022
- Mantidactylus riparius Scherz, Crottini, Hutter, Hildenbrand, Andreone, Fulgence, Köhler, Ndriantsoa, Ohler, Preick, Rakotoarison, Rancilhac, Raselimanana, Riemann, Rödel, Rosa, Streicher, Vieites, Köhler, Hofreiter, Glaw & Vences, 2022
- Mantidactylus fergusoni Scherz, Crottini, Hutter, Hildenbrand, Andreone, Fulgence, Köhler, Ndriantsoa, Ohler, Preick, Rakotoarison, Rancilhac, Raselimanana, Riemann, Rödel, Rosa, Streicher, Vieites, Köhler, Hofreiter, Glaw & Vences, 2022
- Mantidactylus georgei Scherz, Crottini, Hutter, Hildenbrand, Andreone, Fulgence, Köhler, Ndriantsoa, Ohler, Preick, Rakotoarison, Rancilhac, Raselimanana, Riemann, Rödel, Rosa, Streicher, Vieites, Köhler, Hofreiter, Glaw & Vences, 2022
- Mantidactylus jahnarum Scherz, Crottini, Hutter, Hildenbrand, Andreone, Fulgence, Köhler, Ndriantsoa, Ohler, Preick, Rakotoarison, Rancilhac, Raselimanana, Riemann, Rödel, Rosa, Streicher, Vieites, Köhler, Hofreiter, Glaw & Vences, 2022
- Mantidactylus marintsoai Scherz, Crottini, Hutter, Hildenbrand, Andreone, Fulgence, Köhler, Ndriantsoa, Ohler, Preick, Rakotoarison, Rancilhac, Raselimanana, Riemann, Rödel, Rosa, Streicher, Vieites, Köhler, Hofreiter, Glaw & Vences, 2022
- Mantidactylus grubenmanni Scherz, Crottini, Hutter, Hildenbrand, Andreone, Fulgence, Köhler, Ndriantsoa, Ohler, Preick, Rakotoarison, Rancilhac, Raselimanana, Riemann, Rödel, Rosa, Streicher, Vieites, Köhler, Hofreiter, Glaw & Vences, 2022
- Mantidactylus gudrunae Scherz, Crottini, Hutter, Hildenbrand, Andreone, Fulgence, Köhler, Ndriantsoa, Ohler, Preick, Rakotoarison, Rancilhac, Raselimanana, Riemann, Rödel, Rosa, Streicher, Vieites, Köhler, Hofreiter, Glaw & Vences, 2022
- Mantidactylus augustini Scherz, Crottini, Hutter, Hildenbrand, Andreone, Fulgence, Köhler, Ndriantsoa, Ohler, Preick, Rakotoarison, Rancilhac, Raselimanana, Riemann, Rödel, Rosa, Streicher, Vieites, Köhler, Hofreiter, Glaw & Vences, 2022
- Mantidactylus bletzae Scherz, Crottini, Hutter, Hildenbrand, Andreone, Fulgence, Köhler, Ndriantsoa, Ohler, Preick, Rakotoarison, Rancilhac, Raselimanana, Riemann, Rödel, Rosa, Streicher, Vieites, Köhler, Hofreiter, Glaw & Vences, 2022
- Mantidactylus brevirostris Scherz, Crottini, Hutter, Hildenbrand, Andreone, Fulgence, Köhler, Ndriantsoa, Ohler, Preick, Rakotoarison, Rancilhac, Raselimanana, Riemann, Rödel, Rosa, Streicher, Vieites, Köhler, Hofreiter, Glaw & Vences, 2022
- Mantidactylus eulenbergeri Scherz, Crottini, Hutter, Hildenbrand, Andreone, Fulgence, Köhler, Ndriantsoa, Ohler, Preick, Rakotoarison, Rancilhac, Raselimanana, Riemann, Rödel, Rosa, Streicher, Vieites, Köhler, Hofreiter, Glaw & Vences, 2022
- Mantidactylus glosi Scherz, Crottini, Hutter, Hildenbrand, Andreone, Fulgence, Köhler, Ndriantsoa, Ohler, Preick, Rakotoarison, Rancilhac, Raselimanana, Riemann, Rödel, Rosa, Streicher, Vieites, Köhler, Hofreiter, Glaw & Vences, 2022
- Mantidactylus stelliger Scherz, Crottini, Hutter, Hildenbrand, Andreone, Fulgence, Köhler, Ndriantsoa, Ohler, Preick, Rakotoarison, Rancilhac, Raselimanana, Riemann, Rödel, Rosa, Streicher, Vieites, Köhler, Hofreiter, Glaw & Vences, 2022
- Mantidactylus manerana Scherz, Crottini, Hutter, Hildenbrand, Andreone, Fulgence, Köhler, Ndriantsoa, Ohler, Preick, Rakotoarison, Rancilhac, Raselimanana, Riemann, Rödel, Rosa, Streicher, Vieites, Köhler, Hofreiter, Glaw & Vences, 2022

Cladogram of subgenus Brygoomantis:

- Brygoomantis
  - tricinctus complex
    - M. gudrunae
    - - M. tricinctus
      - M. grubenmanni
  - - - - betsileanus complex
          - - - M. noralottae
              - M. kortei
            - - M. katae
              - M. tripunctatus
          - - M. jonasi
            - - M. incognitus
              - M. betsileanus
        - - fergusoni complex
            - M. georgei
            - - M. jahnarum
              - M. fergusoni
          - ulcerosus complex
            - - M. ulcerosus
              - M. bellyi
            - - M. schultzi
              - M. steinfartzi
      - stelliger clade
        M. stelliger
    - - biporus complex
        - - M. brevirostris
          - M. eulenbergeri
        - - M. biporus
          - M. augustini
      - - inaudax complex
          - M. inaudax
          - M. manerana
        - curtus complex
          - M. alutus
          - - - M. mahery
              - M. pauliani
            - - - M. bourgati
                - M. curtus
              - - M. madecassus
                - M. ambohimitombi

- Chonomantis

- Mantidactylus albofrenatus (Müller, 1892)
- Mantidactylus paidroa Bora, Ramilijoana, Raminosoa & Vences, 2011
- Mantidactylus charlotteae Vences & Glaw, 2004
- Mantidactylus zipperi Vences & Glaw, 2004
- Mantidactylus aerumnalis (Peracca, 1893)
- Mantidactylus melanopleura (Mocquard, 1901)
- Mantidactylus opiparis (Peracca, 1893)
- Mantidactylus brevipalmatus Ahl, 1929
- Mantidactylus delormei Angel, 1938

- Ochthomantis

- Mantidactylus ambreensis Mocquard, 1895
- Mantidactylus ambony Scherz, Rasolonjatovo, Köhler, Rancilhac, Rakotoarison, Raselimanana, Ohler, Preick, Hofreiter, Glaw & Vences, 2020
- Mantidactylus femoralis (Boulenger, 1882)
- Mantidactylus mocquardi Angel, 1929
- Mantidactylus zolitschka Glaw & Vences, 2004
- Mantidactylus majori Boulenger, 1896

- Maitsomantis

- Mantidactylus argenteus Methuen, 1920

- Hylobatrachus

- Mantidactylus cowanii (Boulenger, 1882)
- Mantidactylus lugubris (Duméril, 1853)
- Mantidactylus atsimo Scherz, Glaw, Hutter, Bletz, Rakotoarison, Köhler, and Vences, 2019
- Mantidactylus petakorona Scherz, Glaw, Hutter, Bletz, Rakotoarison, Köhler, and Vences, 2019
