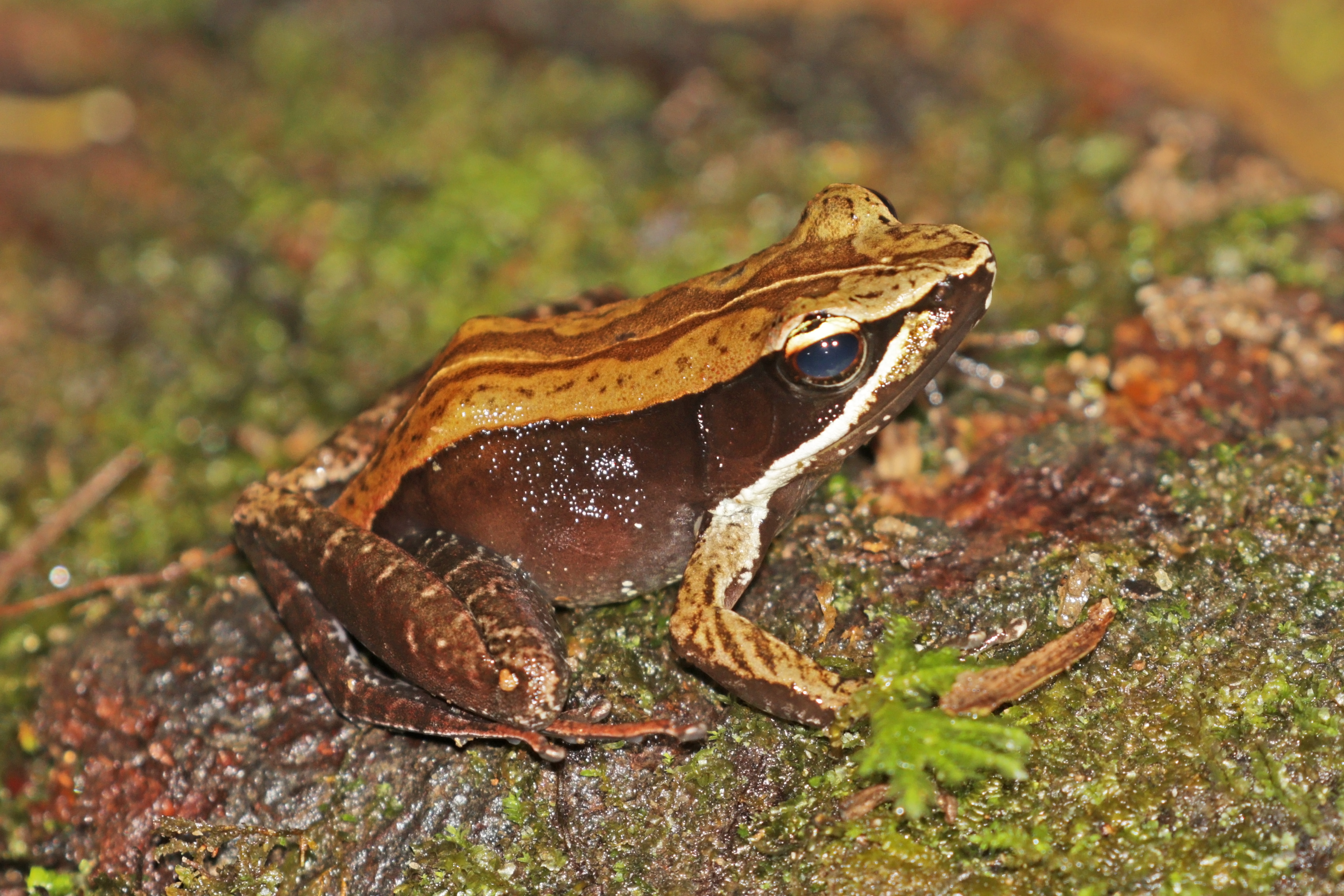
- Ranomafana National Park

Conservation status
- Least Concern (IUCN 3.1)

Scientific classification
- Kingdom: Animalia
- Phylum: Chordata
- Class: Amphibia
- Order: Anura
- Family: Mantellidae
- Genus: Mantidactylus
- Species: M. melanopleura

Binomial name
- Mantidactylus melanopleura (Mocquard, 1901)

= Mantidactylus melanopleura =

Species of frog

Mantidactylus melanopleura is a species of frog in the family Mantellidae. It is endemic to Madagascar. Its natural habitats are subtropical or tropical moist lowland forests and rivers. It is threatened by habitat loss.
