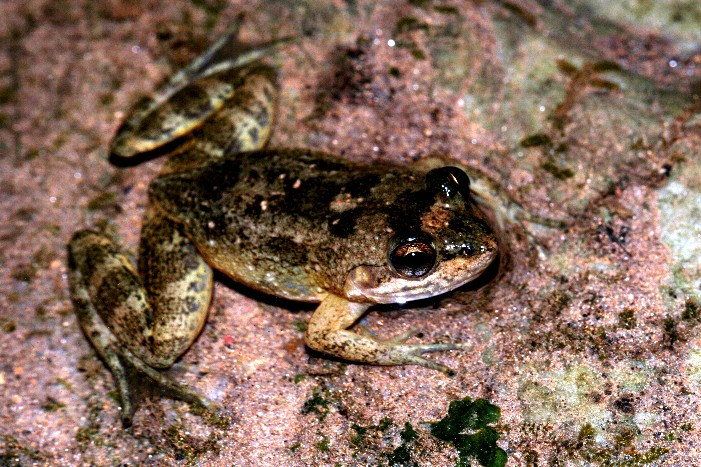

Conservation status
- Least Concern (IUCN 3.1)

Scientific classification
- Kingdom: Animalia
- Phylum: Chordata
- Class: Amphibia
- Order: Anura
- Family: Mantellidae
- Genus: Mantidactylus
- Species: M. curtus

Binomial name
- Mantidactylus curtus (Boulenger, 1882)

= Mantidactylus curtus =

Species of frog

Mantidactylus curtus is a species of frog in the family Mantellidae. It is endemic to Madagascar.

== Range and habitat ==
Mantidactylus curtus is found in a wide range of habitats on the island, including moist lowland forest, moist montane forest, high-altitude shrubland and grassland, rivers, intermittent rivers, arable land, pastureland, rural gardens, and heavily degraded former forest, from 600 up to 2,400 meters elevation.

== Taxonomy ==
Mantidactylus curtus is an unresolved complex of at least five species. Some of the species' reported locations are misidentified with other species. Glaw and Vences (2006) separated Mantidactylus bellyi and M. bourgati from M. curtus.
