= Mantidactylus zipperi =

Conservation status
- Least Concern (IUCN 3.1)

Scientific classification
- Kingdom: Animalia
- Phylum: Chordata
- Class: Amphibia
- Order: Anura
- Family: Mantellidae
- Genus: Mantidactylus
- Species: M. zipperi

Binomial name
- Mantidactylus zipperi Vences & Glaw, 2004

Species of frog

Mantidactylus zipperi is a species of frog in the family Mantellidae. It is endemic to Madagascar. Its natural habitat is pristine or only slightly disturbed rainforest. It is usually found near streams. It is threatened by habitat loss.
