= Mantidactylus madecassus =

Conservation status
- Endangered (IUCN 3.1)

Scientific classification
- Kingdom: Animalia
- Phylum: Chordata
- Class: Amphibia
- Order: Anura
- Family: Mantellidae
- Genus: Mantidactylus
- Species: M. madecassus

Binomial name
- Mantidactylus madecassus (Millot & Guibé, 1950)

Species of frog

Mantidactylus madecassus, commonly known as the Andringitra Madagascar frog, is a species of frog in the family Mantellidae. It is endemic to Madagascar.

== Range and habitat ==
Mantidactylus madecassus is native to the Andringitra Massif in Madagascar's Central Highlands. It lives in clear, rocky streams between 1,500 and 2,500 meters elevation, in upper montane forest and in high-elevation shrublands and savannas above the tree-line. It is mostly aquatic, and breeds in slower-flowing streams and pools.

It has been recorded at about ten locations in Andringitra. Its extent of occurrence (EOO) is 1,290 km^{2}. It is rare, and its population is decreasing from loss and degradation of habitat.
