= Mantidactylus ambohimitombi =

Conservation status
- Data Deficient (IUCN 3.1)

Scientific classification
- Kingdom: Animalia
- Phylum: Chordata
- Class: Amphibia
- Order: Anura
- Family: Mantellidae
- Genus: Mantidactylus
- Species: M. ambohimitombi

Binomial name
- Mantidactylus ambohimitombi Boulenger, 1919

Species of frog

Mantidactylus ambohimitombi is a species of frog in the family Mantellidae. It is endemic to Madagascar. Its natural habitats are subtropical or tropical moist montane forests, subtropical or tropical high-altitude grassland, and rivers. It is threatened by habitat loss.

== Subspecies ==
Three subspecies are identified:

- M. ambohimitombi ambohimitombi
- M. ambohimitombi marefo
- M. ambohimitombi miloko
