= Mantidactylus bourgati =

Conservation status
- Endangered (IUCN 3.1)

Scientific classification
- Kingdom: Animalia
- Phylum: Chordata
- Class: Amphibia
- Order: Anura
- Family: Mantellidae
- Genus: Mantidactylus
- Species: M. bourgati

Binomial name
- Mantidactylus bourgati Guibé, 1974

Species of frog

Mantidactylus bourgati, Bourgat's mantidactylus, is a species of frog in the family Mantellidae. The species is endemic to Madagascar.

== Range and habitat ==
Mantidactylus bourgati is found only on the Andringitra Massif in Madagascar's Central Highlands. It inhabits, and breeds in, clear streams running through montane forests and in montane grasslands above the treeline.

The species requires clear streams, and is affected by habitat degradation. Its extent of occurrence (EOO) is 1,313 km^{2}.

== Taxonomy ==
Mantidactylus bourgati previously considered as M. curtus, populations from the Andringitra Massif have recently been resurrected under the name M. bourgati. Specimens of quite variable morphology and colouration can be found along streams both inside montane forest, and above the treeline (Glaw and Vences 2007).
