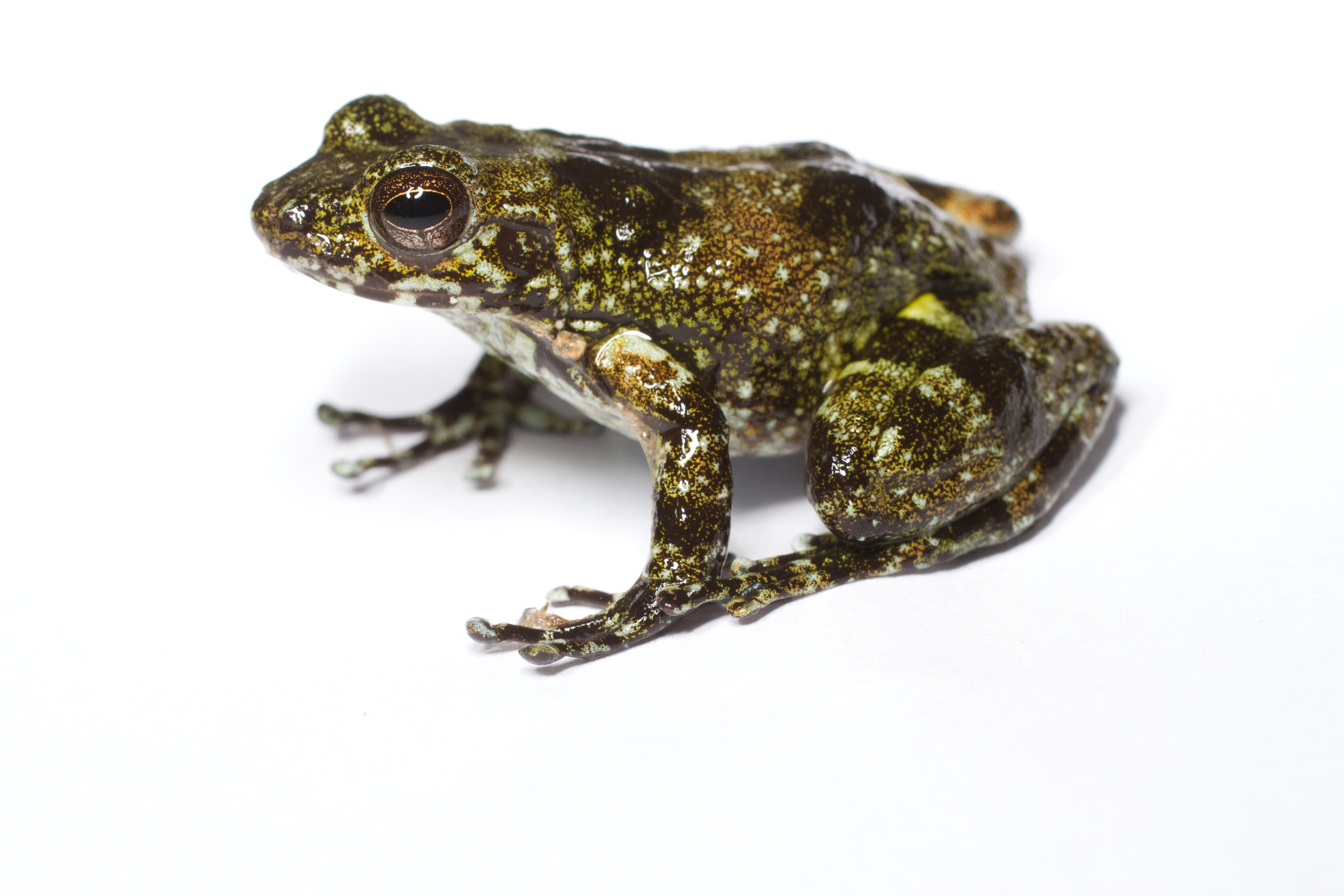

Conservation status
- Near Threatened (IUCN 3.1)

Scientific classification
- Kingdom: Animalia
- Phylum: Chordata
- Class: Amphibia
- Order: Anura
- Family: Mantellidae
- Genus: Mantidactylus
- Species: M. cowanii

Binomial name
- Mantidactylus cowanii (Boulenger, 1882)

= Mantidactylus cowanii =

Species of frog

Mantidactylus cowanii is a species of frog in the family Mantellidae. The species is endemic to Madagascar.
