= Mantidactylus tricinctus =

Conservation status
- Vulnerable (IUCN 3.1)

Scientific classification
- Kingdom: Animalia
- Phylum: Chordata
- Class: Amphibia
- Order: Anura
- Family: Mantellidae
- Genus: Mantidactylus
- Species: M. tricinctus

Binomial name
- Mantidactylus tricinctus (Guibé, 1947)

Synonyms
- Gephyromantis tricinctus Guibé, 1947

Species of frog

Mantidactylus tricinctus, the three-banded mantidactylus, is a species of frog in the family Mantellidae.

== Distribution and habitat ==
This species is endemic to Madagascar. It is found between 450 and 850 m elevation at three sites in the east and southeast of the island, An'Ala, Befotaka and Vondrozo. Its natural habitats are subtropical or tropical moist lowland forests, rivers, and swamps. It is threatened by habitat loss.

== Description ==
Mantidactylus tricinctus measures 17 to 19 mm long. Its back is brown with darker blotches. The species is characterized by a yellow patch on the groin and a white one at the tip of the snout.

== Original Publication ==
- Guibé, 1947 : Trois Gephyromantis nouveaux de Madagascar (Batraciens). Bulletin du Muséum national d'histoire naturelle 2 (19): 151–155.
