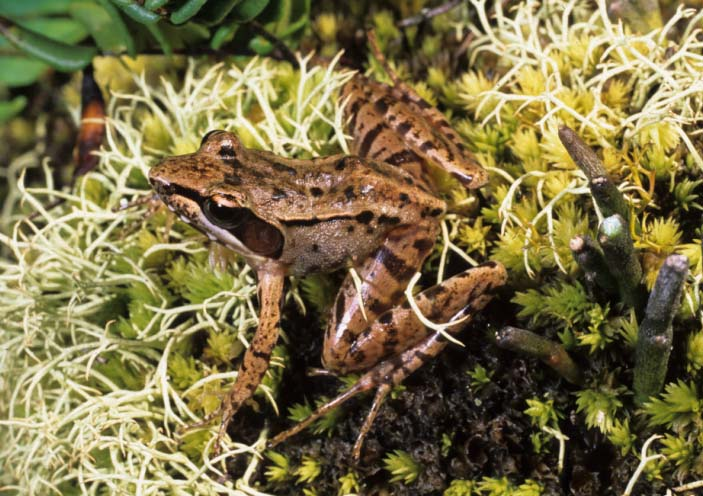

Conservation status
- Least Concern (IUCN 3.1)

Scientific classification
- Kingdom: Animalia
- Phylum: Chordata
- Class: Amphibia
- Order: Anura
- Family: Mantellidae
- Genus: Mantidactylus
- Species: M. brevipalmatus

Binomial name
- Mantidactylus brevipalmatus Ahl, 1929

= Mantidactylus brevipalmatus =

Species of frog

Mantidactylus brevipalmatus is a species of frog in the family Mantellidae. It is endemic to Madagascar. Its natural habitats are subtropical or tropical moist montane forests, subtropical or tropical high-altitude grassland, rivers, swamps, pastureland, and heavily degraded former forest.
