= Tretanorhinus variabilis =

Conservation status
- Least Concern (IUCN 3.1)

Scientific classification
- Kingdom: Animalia
- Phylum: Chordata
- Class: Reptilia
- Order: Squamata
- Suborder: Serpentes
- Family: Colubridae
- Genus: Tretanorhinus
- Species: T. variabilis

Binomial name
- Tretanorhinus variabilis A.M.C. Duméril, Bibron, & A.H.A. Duméril, 1854

Species of snake

Tretanorhinus variabilis, the Caribbean water snake, is a species of snake in the family Colubridae. It is the only species in the genus Tretanorhinus found in the Caribbean.

== Distribution and habitat ==
=== Geographic range ===
The Caribbean water snake is found on Cuba, specifically la Isla de la Juventud, and the Cayman Islands.

=== Habitat ===
Described as an aquatic species, T. variabilis inhabits many different freshwater sources such as rivers, canals, and lagoons. Due the species occasionally being pushed out of its habitat by flooding or similar events, they have adapted to tolerate saltwater for a short amount of time and have since dispersed among several offshore islands.

== Morphology ==
T. variabilis is the largest species of the genus Tretanorhinus, measuring up to 500–800 mm (20–31 in) in snout-vent length, with juveniles in the range of 143–145 mm (5.6–5.7 in). The genus is characterized by gray dorsal coloration, sometimes patterned with spots or stripes of light yellow/orange, which are reflected in juveniles as well.

Males of the species exhibit tubercles on the underside of their head, while the females do not exhibit this trait.

Due to this species being aquatic, there are certain morphological adaptations that it exhibits including having eyes and nostrils on top of the head (dorsally) as well as colors and markings that blend well with aquatic vegetation (dark browns, olives, greens).

== Behavior ==
This species of snake relies on vegetative cover and rocky or muddy floorings at the bottom of bodies of freshwater for rest and hiding. Being aquatic, T. variabilis preys on and consumes fish, aquatic invertebrates, amphibians and sometimes crabs and has been shown to forage for and ambush species of fish that are motionless near riverbanks. These foraging and ambush techniques take place mainly at night due to T. variabilis being nocturnal.

== Reproduction ==
T. variabilis are oviparous, with most females being gravid during wet season (July-August) but occasional reports of gravid females in the dry season. Females lay 6–9 eggs per clutch, which hatch in about 35 days. The eggs are adherent and measure on average 35 x 16.75 mm.
