= Tretanorhinus taeniatus =

Conservation status
- Near Threatened (IUCN 3.1)

Scientific classification
- Kingdom: Animalia
- Phylum: Chordata
- Class: Reptilia
- Order: Squamata
- Suborder: Serpentes
- Family: Colubridae
- Genus: Tretanorhinus
- Species: T. taeniatus

Binomial name
- Tretanorhinus taeniatus Boulenger, 1903

Species of snake

Tretanorhinus taeniatus, the striped swamp snake, is a species of snake in the family, Colubridae. It is found in Colombia and Ecuador.
