= Mantidactylus zolitschka =

Conservation status
- Critically Endangered (IUCN 3.1)

Scientific classification
- Kingdom: Animalia
- Phylum: Chordata
- Class: Amphibia
- Order: Anura
- Family: Mantellidae
- Genus: Mantidactylus
- Species: M. zolitschka

Binomial name
- Mantidactylus zolitschka Glaw & Vences, 2004

Species of frog

Mantidactylus zolitschka is a species of frog in the family Mantellidae, endemic to Madagascar's subtropical and tropical moist lowland forests and rivers, where it is threatened by major habitat loss.
