= Tretanorhinus nigroluteus =

Conservation status
- Least Concern (IUCN 3.1)

Scientific classification
- Kingdom: Animalia
- Phylum: Chordata
- Class: Reptilia
- Order: Squamata
- Suborder: Serpentes
- Family: Colubridae
- Genus: Tretanorhinus
- Species: T. nigroluteus

Binomial name
- Tretanorhinus nigroluteus Cope, 1861

Species of snake

Tretanorhinus nigroluteus, the orange-bellied swamp snake or orangebelly swamp snake, is a species of snake in the family, Colubridae. It is found in Panama, Mexico, Guatemala, Honduras, Nicaragua, Belize, and Costa Rica.
