= Mantidactylus delormei =

Conservation status
- Endangered (IUCN 3.1)

Scientific classification
- Kingdom: Animalia
- Phylum: Chordata
- Class: Amphibia
- Order: Anura
- Family: Mantellidae
- Genus: Mantidactylus
- Species: M. delormei

Binomial name
- Mantidactylus delormei Angel, 1938

Species of amphibian

Mantidactylus delormei is a species of frogs in the family Mantellidae. The species is endemic to Madagascar.
