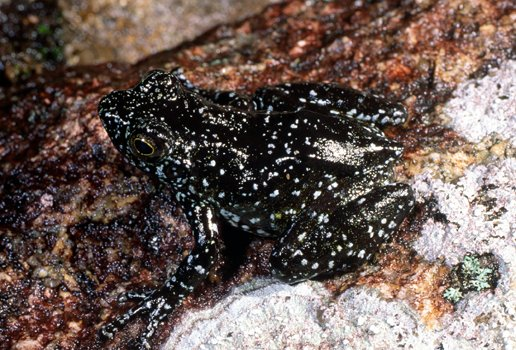

Conservation status
- Least Concern (IUCN 3.1)

Scientific classification
- Kingdom: Animalia
- Phylum: Chordata
- Class: Amphibia
- Order: Anura
- Family: Mantellidae
- Genus: Mantidactylus
- Species: M. lugubris

Binomial name
- Mantidactylus lugubris (Duméril, 1853)

= Mantidactylus lugubris =

Species of amphibian

Mantidactylus lugubris is a frog species in the family Mantellidae. It is endemic to Madagascar.

Its natural habitats are subtropical or tropical moist lowland forests, subtropical or tropical moist montane forests, moist savanna, subtropical or tropical high-altitude grassland, rivers, and heavily degraded former forest. It is not considered threatened by the IUCN.
