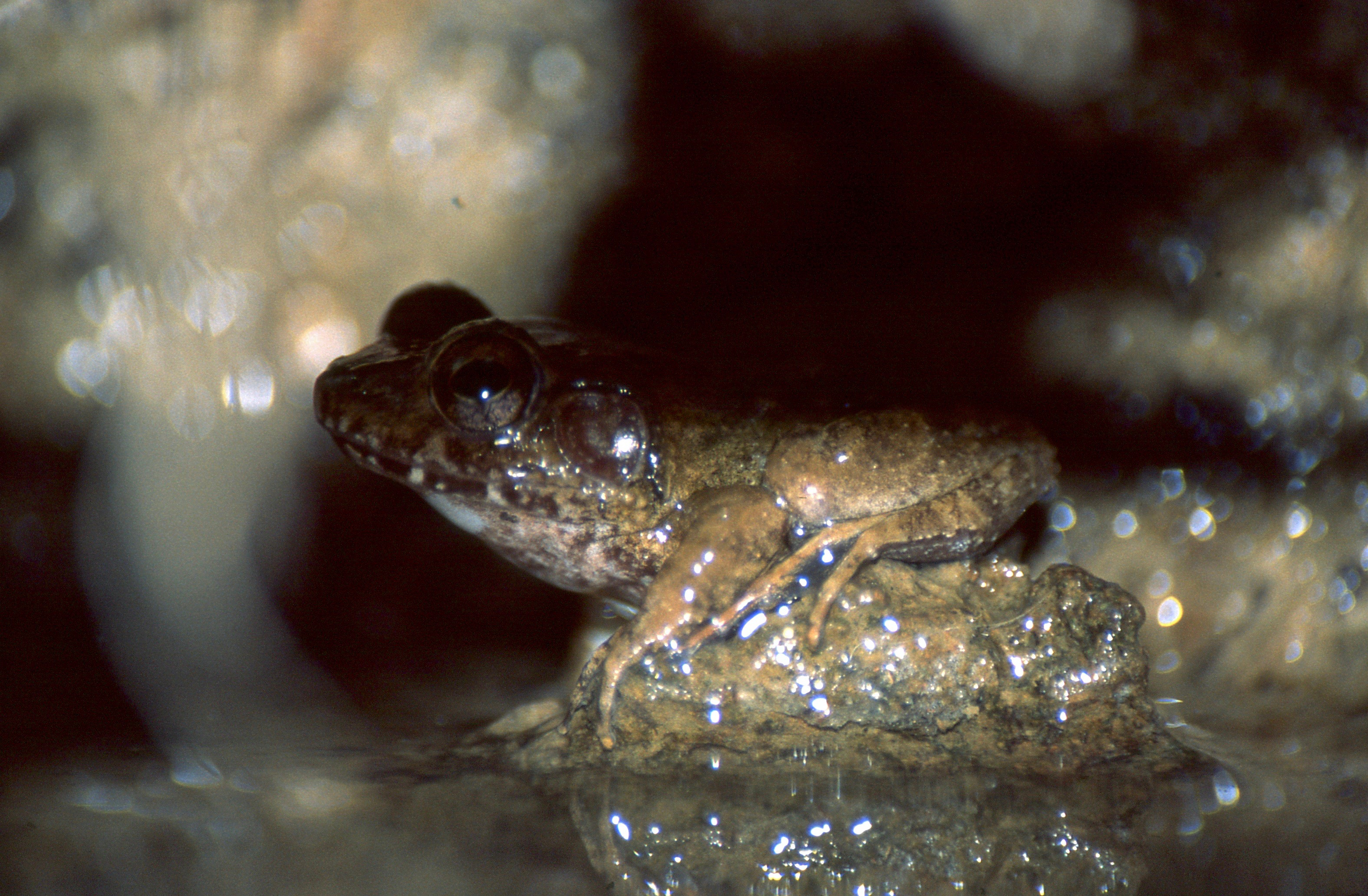
- Photographed: 1999 CE

Conservation status
- Least Concern (IUCN 3.1)

Scientific classification
- Kingdom: Animalia
- Phylum: Chordata
- Class: Amphibia
- Order: Anura
- Family: Mantellidae
- Genus: Mantidactylus
- Species: M. bellyi

Binomial name
- Mantidactylus bellyi Mocquard, 1895

= Mantidactylus bellyi =

Species of frog

Mantidactylus bellyi is a species of frog in the family Mantellidae. The species is endemic to Madagascar. This species is found in the Montagne d'Ambre National Park. It lives in multiple biomes like, freshwater, forests, grasslands and wetlands. They breed in streams.
