= Mantidactylus charlotteae =

Conservation status
- Least Concern (IUCN 3.1)

Scientific classification
- Kingdom: Animalia
- Phylum: Chordata
- Class: Amphibia
- Order: Anura
- Family: Mantellidae
- Genus: Mantidactylus
- Species: M. charlotteae

Binomial name
- Mantidactylus charlotteae Vences and Glaw, 2004

Species of frog

Mantidactylus charlotteae is a species of frog in the family Mantellidae. It is endemic to Madagascar and found in the eastern part of the country in the coastal rainforest belt between Marojejy in the north and possibly as far as Andohahela in the south.

== Description ==
Males measure 22–26 mm (0.87–1.02 in) and females 26–32 mm (1.0–1.3 in) in snout–vent length. The body relatively slender. The head is long with rounded snout. The tympanum is distinct. The limbs are slender. The fingers are without webbing whereas the toes are webbed. The back is reddish brown in colour and without markings. There are reddish dorso-lateral glandular ridges. The flanks are blackish, with a sharp border towards the dorsum.

== Habitat and conservation ==
Its natural habitats are pristine or slightly disturbed rainforests at elevations of up to 600 m (2,000 ft) above sea level. It is a terrestrial species that is often found near streams where. It breeds in streams but lays its eggs on land.

Mantidactylus charlotteae is a very abundant species, although it is suspected to be decreasing because of habitat loss and deterioration. These threats are driven by agriculture, timber extraction, charcoaling, spread of eucalyptus, livestock grazing, and expanding human settlements. However, it occurs in several protected areas.
