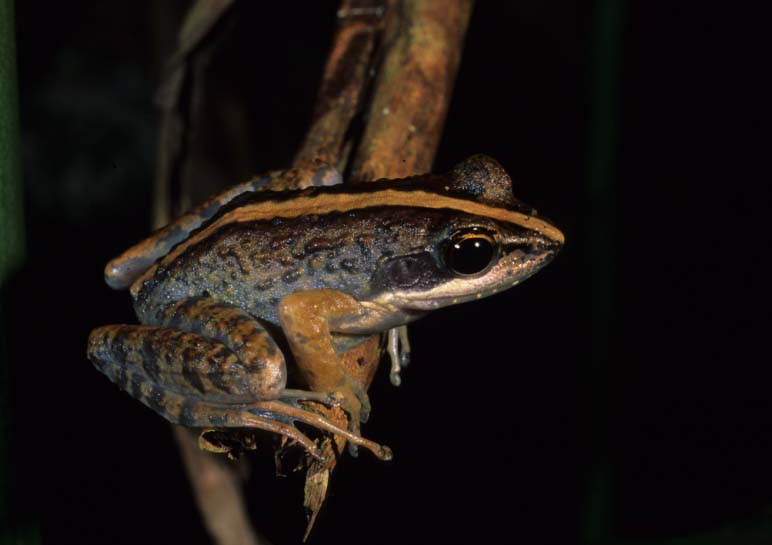
- Location unknown
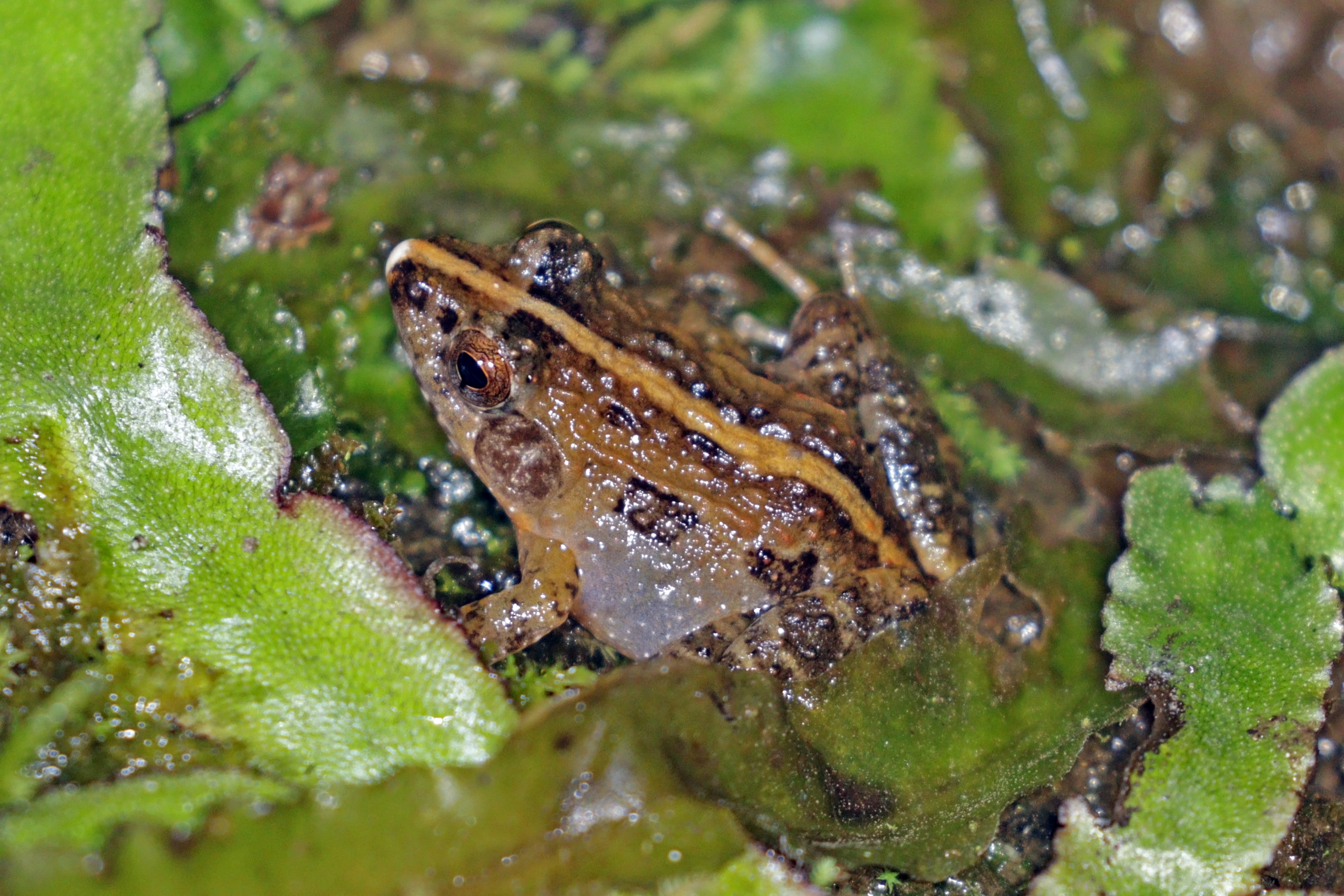
- Ranomafana National Park

Conservation status
- Least Concern (IUCN 3.1)

Scientific classification
- Kingdom: Animalia
- Phylum: Chordata
- Class: Amphibia
- Order: Anura
- Family: Mantellidae
- Genus: Mantidactylus
- Species: M. femoralis

Binomial name
- Mantidactylus femoralis (Boulenger, 1882)

= Mantidactylus femoralis =

Species of frog

Mantidactylus femoralis is a species of frog in the family Mantellidae. It is endemic to Madagascar. It is a complex of multiple species. Its natural habitats are subtropical or tropical moist lowland forests, subtropical or tropical moist montane forests, subtropical or tropical high-altitude shrubland, rivers, and heavily degraded former forest. It is threatened by habitat loss.
