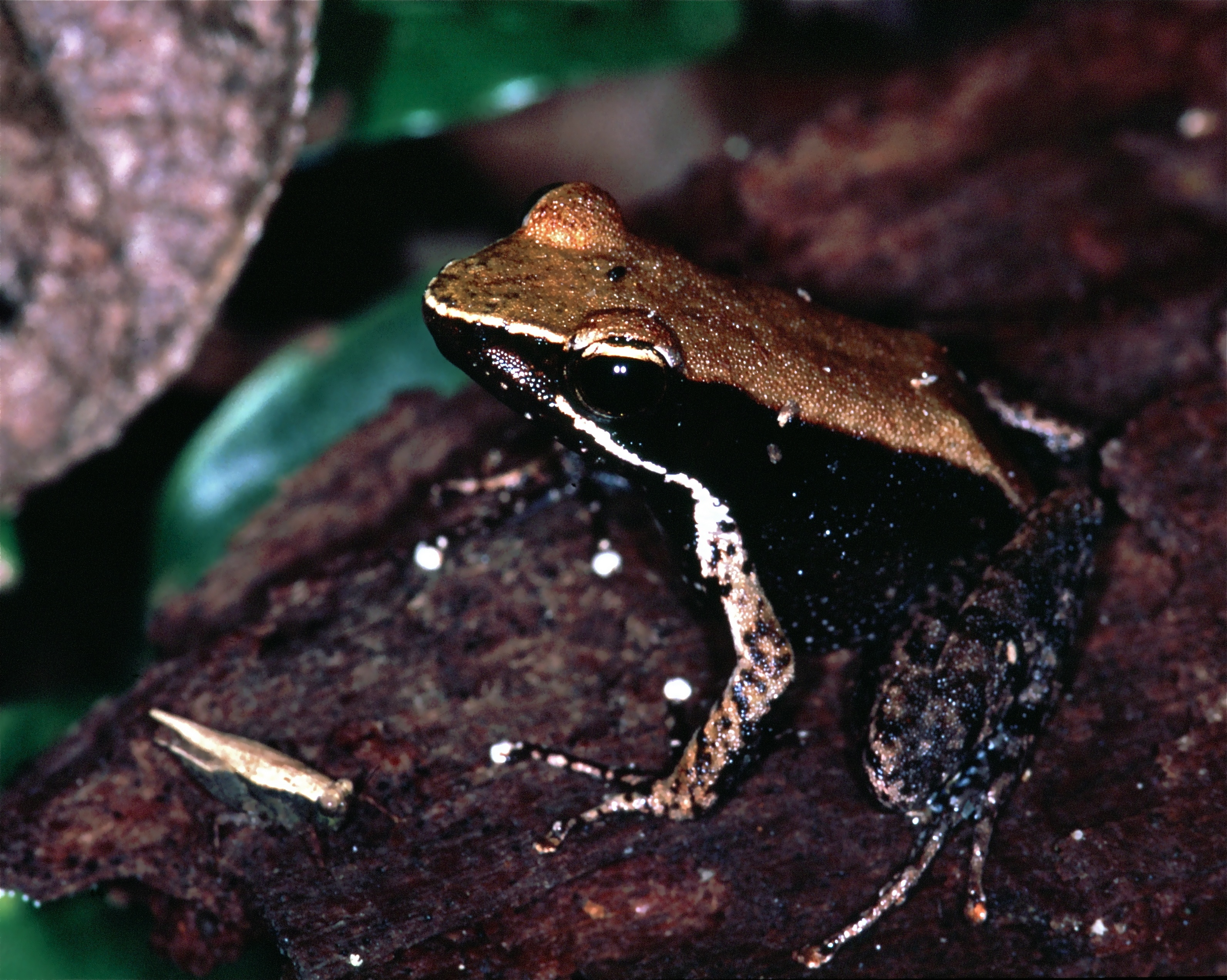

Conservation status
- Endangered (IUCN 3.1)

Scientific classification
- Kingdom: Animalia
- Phylum: Chordata
- Class: Amphibia
- Order: Anura
- Family: Mantellidae
- Genus: Mantidactylus
- Species: M. albofrenatus

Binomial name
- Mantidactylus albofrenatus (Müller, 1892)

Synonyms
- Rana albofrenata Müller, 1892; Rhacophorus albofrenatus (Müller, 1892)

= Mantidactylus albofrenatus =

Species of frog

Mantidactylus albofrenatus is a species of frog in the family Mantellidae. It is endemic to eastern Madagascar near An'Ala and Andasibe. Common name eastern Madagascar frog has been proposed for it.

== Description ==
Adult males measure 19–23 mm (0.7–0.9 in) and adult females 25–27 mm (1.0–1.1 in) in snout–vent length. The legs are short. The tympanum is large in the males, larger than the eye. Males have distinct femoral glands. The toes have rudimentary webbing. The dorsal colouration is brown, forming a distinct dorsolateral colour border with the dark brown flanks. A distinct light stripe runs from the forelimb insertion to (almost) the nostril. The throat is dark grey with a distinct pattern of white spots forming a median row. The hind limbs have dark crossbands.

The male advertisement call is a rapid series of 31–36 short pulsed notes.

== Habitat and conservation ==
Mantidactylus albofrenatus is a terrestrial frog occurring in pristine or only slightly disturbed rainforest at elevations of 850–900 m (2,790–2,950 ft) above sea level. It is often found near streams. Calling males have been found near streams during the daytime. The eggs are presumably laid on land.

It is a locally abundant species, but it is only from two localities and its population is suspected to be decreasing because of ongoing habitat loss and deterioration. It occurs in the Analamazaotra Special Reserve.
