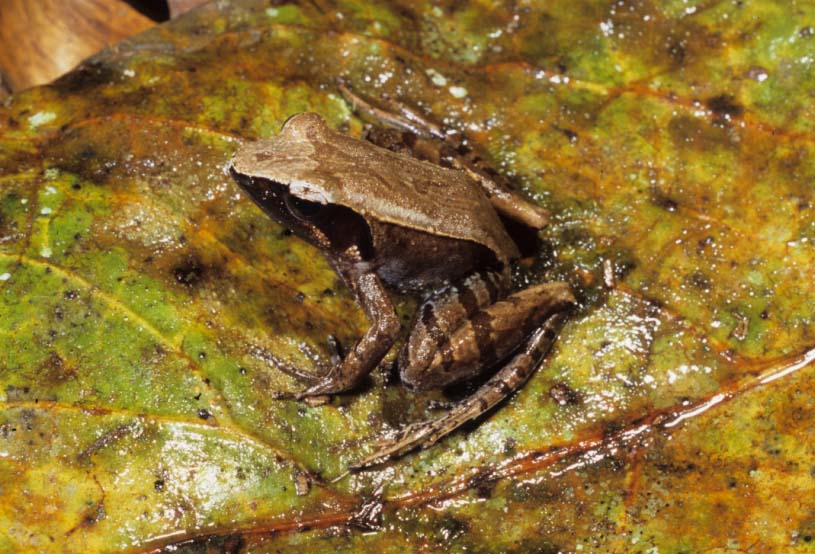

Conservation status
- Least Concern (IUCN 3.1)

Scientific classification
- Kingdom: Animalia
- Phylum: Chordata
- Class: Amphibia
- Order: Anura
- Family: Mantellidae
- Genus: Mantidactylus
- Species: M. aerumnalis

Binomial name
- Mantidactylus aerumnalis (Peracca, 1893)

= Mantidactylus aerumnalis =

Species of frog

Mantidactylus aerumnalis is a species of frog in the family Mantellidae. It is endemic to Madagascar. Its natural habitats are subtropical or tropical moist lowland forests, subtropical or tropical moist montane forests, and rivers. It is threatened by habitat loss.
