= Tretanorhinus mocquardi =

Conservation status
- Data Deficient (IUCN 3.1)

Scientific classification
- Kingdom: Animalia
- Phylum: Chordata
- Class: Reptilia
- Order: Squamata
- Suborder: Serpentes
- Family: Colubridae
- Genus: Tretanorhinus
- Species: T. mocquardi

Binomial name
- Tretanorhinus mocquardi Bocourt, 1891

Species of snake

Tretanorhinus mocquardi, also known commonly as Mocquard's swamp snake, is a species of snake in the subfamily Dipsadinae of the family Colubridae. The species is native to Colombia, Ecuador, and Panama.

== Etymology ==
The specific name, mocquardi, is in honor of French herpetologist François Mocquard.

== Description ==
Tretanorhinus mocquardi has a single prefrontal. There are 19 rows of dorsal scales at midbody. Males have 166–169 ventrals and 78–85 subcaudals. Females have 168–177 ventrals and 69–74 subcaudals. Dorsally, it is brownish olive, with a yellow stripe on each flank.

== Habitat ==
The preferred natural habitat of Tretanorhinus mocquardi is freshwater wetlands such as swamp forest and mangroves, at elevations from sea level to 30 m (98 ft).

== Reproduction ==
Tretanorhinus mocquardi is oviparous.
