= Tretanorhinus =

Scientific classification
- Kingdom: Animalia
- Phylum: Chordata
- Class: Reptilia
- Order: Squamata
- Suborder: Serpentes
- Family: Colubridae
- Subfamily: Dipsadinae
- Genus: Tretanorhinus; A.M.C. Duméril, Bibron & A.H.A. Duméril, 1854

Genus of snakes

Tretanorhinus is a genus of snakes in the subfamily Dipsadinae of the family Colubridae.

== Geographic distribution ==
The genus Tretanorhinus is native to Central America, northern South America, and the West Indies.

== Species ==
The genus contains the following four species which are recognized as being valid.

- Tretanorhinus mocquardi Bocourt, 1891 – Mocquard's swamp snake
- Tretanorhinus nigroluteus Cope, 1861 – orange-bellied swamp snake, orangebelly swamp snake, buceadora
- Tretanorhinus taeniatus Boulenger, 1903 – striped swamp snake
- Tretanorhinus variabilis A.M.C. Duméril, Bibron & A.H.A. Duméril, 1854 – Caribbean water snake

== Reproduction ==
All species in the genus Tretanorhinus are oviparous.
