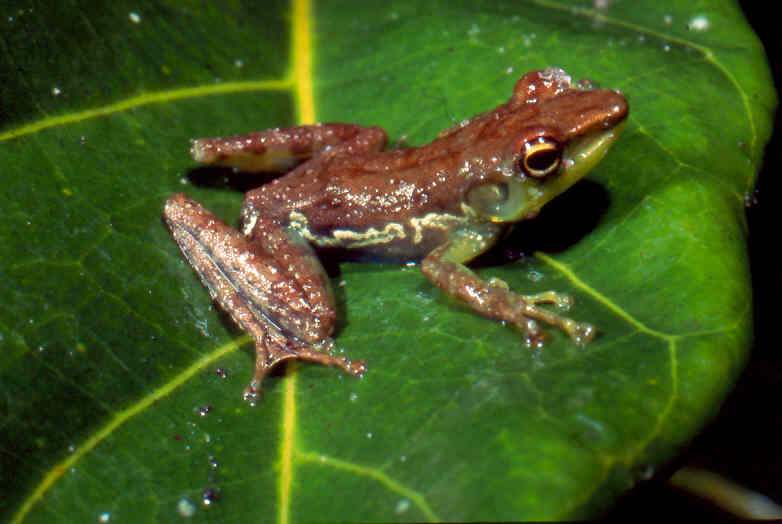

Conservation status
- Least Concern (IUCN 3.1)

Scientific classification
- Kingdom: Animalia
- Phylum: Chordata
- Class: Amphibia
- Order: Anura
- Family: Mantellidae
- Genus: Mantidactylus
- Species: M. argenteus

Binomial name
- Mantidactylus argenteus Methuen, 1920

= Mantidactylus argenteus =

Species of frog

Mantidactylus argenteus is a species of frog in the family Mantellidae. It is endemic to Madagascar. Its natural habitats are subtropical or tropical moist lowland forests and heavily degraded former forest. It is threatened by habitat loss.
