= Mantidactylus ulcerosus =

Conservation status
- Least Concern (IUCN 3.1)

Scientific classification
- Kingdom: Animalia
- Phylum: Chordata
- Class: Amphibia
- Order: Anura
- Family: Mantellidae
- Genus: Mantidactylus
- Species: M. ulcerosus

Binomial name
- Mantidactylus ulcerosus (Boettger, 1880)

Species of frog

Mantidactylus ulcerosus is a species of frog in the family Mantellidae. It is endemic to Madagascar. Its natural habitats are subtropical or tropical moist lowland forests, subtropical or tropical moist montane forests, rivers, swamps, freshwater marshes, intermittent freshwater marshes, and heavily degraded former forest. It is threatened by habitat loss.
