= Mantidactylus alutus =

Conservation status
- Least Concern (IUCN 3.1)

Scientific classification
- Kingdom: Animalia
- Phylum: Chordata
- Class: Amphibia
- Order: Anura
- Family: Mantellidae
- Genus: Mantidactylus
- Species: M. alutus

Binomial name
- Mantidactylus alutus (Peracca, 1893)

Species of frog

Mantidactylus alutus is a species of frog in the family Mantellidae. It is endemic to Madagascar. Its natural habitats are subtropical or tropical moist montane forests, subtropical or tropical seasonally wet or flooded lowland grassland, subtropical or tropical high-altitude grassland, rivers, intermittent rivers, arable land, pastureland, rural gardens, urban areas, heavily degraded former forest, and seasonally flooded agricultural land.
