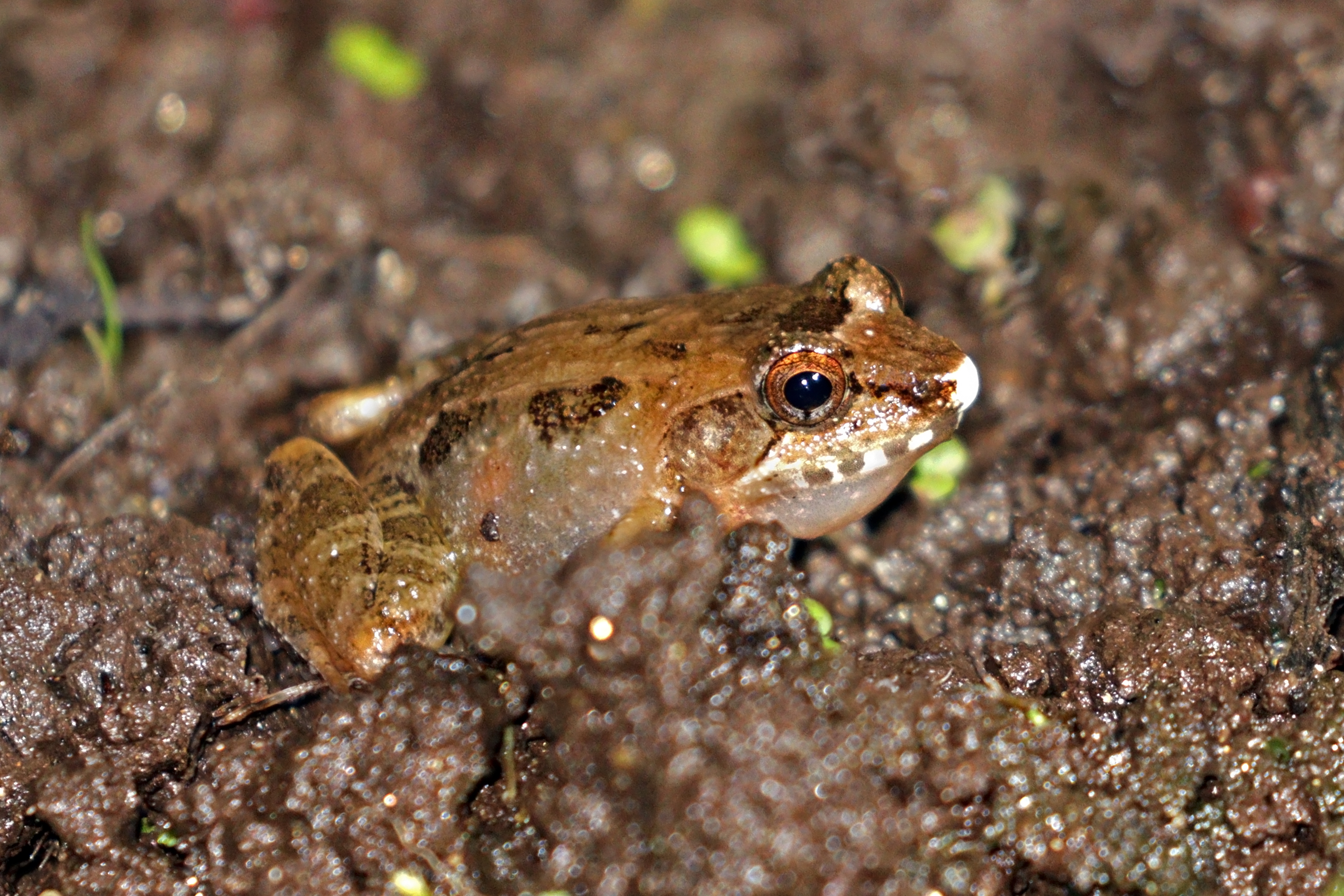
- Ranomafana National Park

Conservation status
- Least Concern (IUCN 3.1)

Scientific classification
- Kingdom: Animalia
- Phylum: Chordata
- Class: Amphibia
- Order: Anura
- Family: Mantellidae
- Genus: Mantidactylus
- Species: M. betsileanus

Binomial name
- Mantidactylus betsileanus (Boulenger, 1882)

= Mantidactylus betsileanus =

Species of frog

Mantidactylus betsileanus is a species of frog in the family Mantellidae. It is endemic to Madagascar. Its natural habitats are subtropical or tropical moist lowland forests, subtropical or tropical moist montane forests, rivers, freshwater marshes, intermittent freshwater marshes, arable land, rural gardens, heavily degraded former forest, and seasonally flooded agricultural land.

Breeding takes place in streams, pools, puddles, and rice fields (Vences and Nussbaum 2008)

Possible reasons for amphibian decline

General habitat alteration and loss

Habitat modification from deforestation, or logging related activities

Habitat fragmentation
