= Mantidactylus noralottae =

Conservation status
- Data Deficient (IUCN 3.1)

Scientific classification
- Kingdom: Animalia
- Phylum: Chordata
- Class: Amphibia
- Order: Anura
- Family: Mantellidae
- Genus: Mantidactylus
- Species: M. noralottae

Binomial name
- Mantidactylus noralottae Mercurio & Andreone, 2007

Species of frog

Mantidactylus noralottae is a species of frog in the family Mantellidae. The species is endemic to Madagascar.
