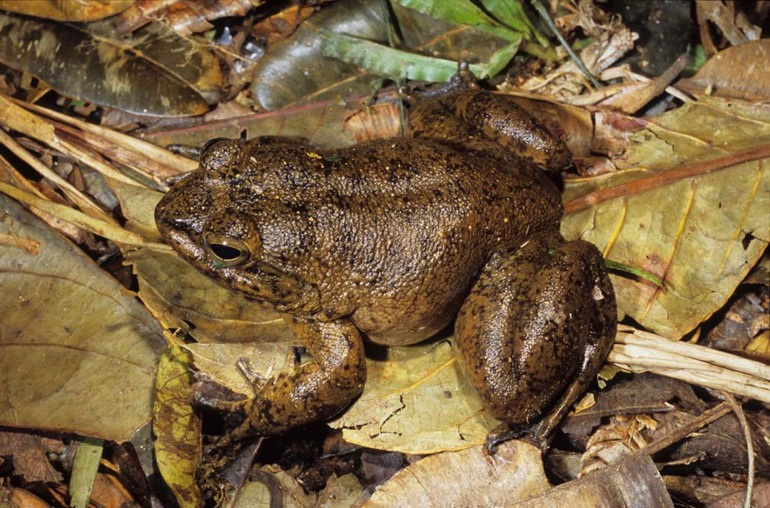

Conservation status
- Least Concern (IUCN 3.1)

Scientific classification
- Kingdom: Animalia
- Phylum: Chordata
- Class: Amphibia
- Order: Anura
- Family: Mantellidae
- Genus: Mantidactylus
- Species: M. guttulatus

Binomial name
- Mantidactylus guttulatus (Boulenger, 1881)

= Mantidactylus guttulatus =

Species of frog

Mantidactylus guttulatus is a species of frog in the family Mantellidae. It is endemic to Madagascar.

Its natural habitats are subtropical or tropical moist lowland forests and rivers. It is not considered threatened by the IUCN.
