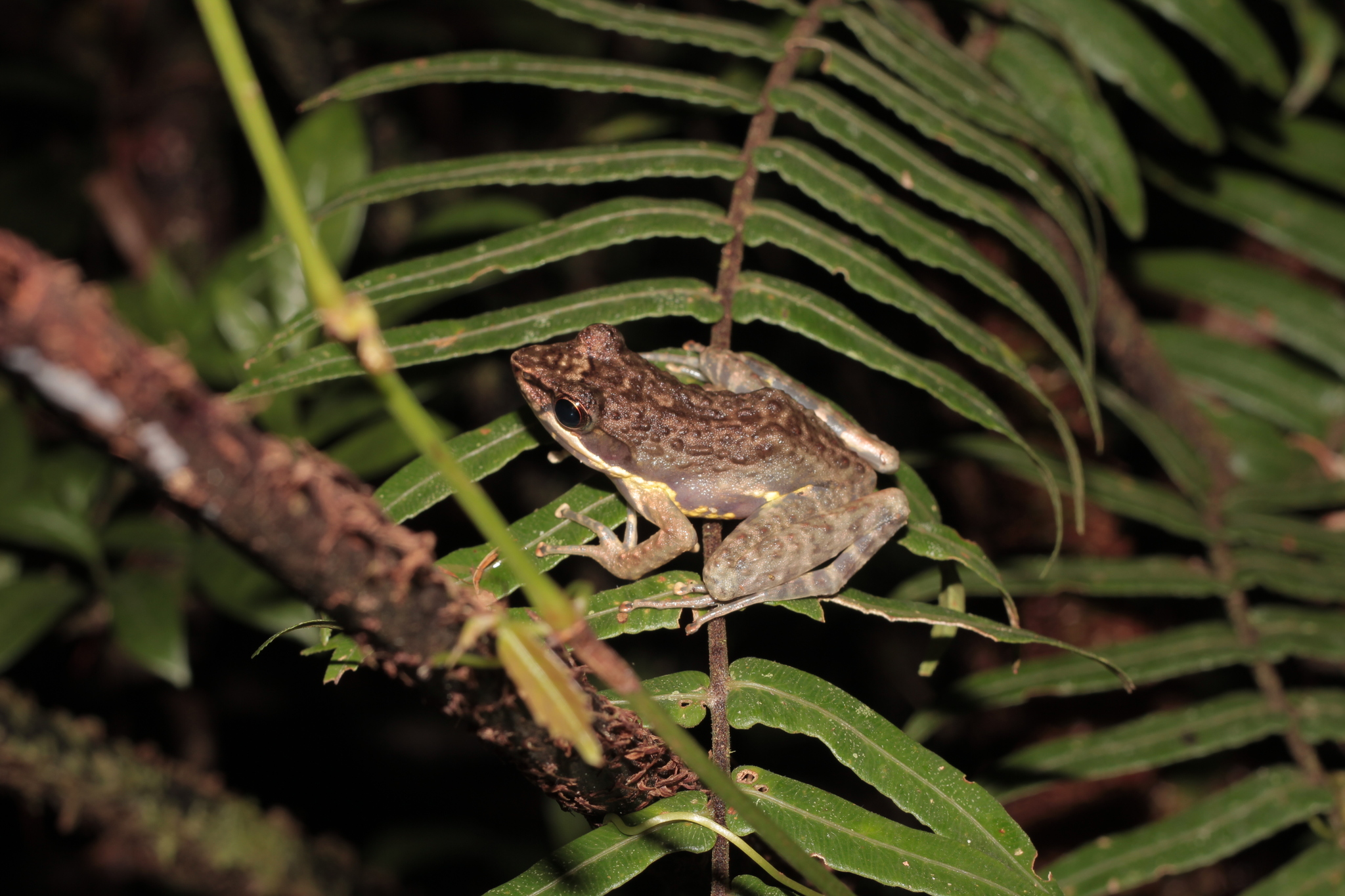

Conservation status
- Least Concern (IUCN 3.1)

Scientific classification
- Kingdom: Animalia
- Phylum: Chordata
- Class: Amphibia
- Order: Anura
- Family: Mantellidae
- Genus: Mantidactylus
- Species: M. mocquardi

Binomial name
- Mantidactylus mocquardi Angel, 1929

= Mantidactylus mocquardi =

Species of frog

Mantidactylus mocquardi is a species of frog in the family Mantellidae. It is endemic to Madagascar. Its natural habitats are subtropical or tropical moist lowland forests, subtropical or tropical moist montane forests, subtropical or tropical high-altitude shrubland, intermittent rivers, and heavily degraded former forest. It is threatened by habitat loss.
