= François Mocquard =

French herpetologist

François Mocquard (27 October 1834 – 19 March 1917) was a French herpetologist born in Leffond, Haute-Saône. Mocquard has often been cited as "M.F. Mocquard" where the "M." is not a name but rather stands for "Monsieur".

In 1860 he was named préparateur du physique after receiving his Bachelor of Science degree at the Faculty of Besançon. Subsequently, he earned degrees in physical sciences (1862), mathematical sciences (1865) and medicine (1873). Despite being middle-aged, he made a career change, and began studying natural sciences in the laboratory of Alphonse Milne-Edwards (1835-1900) at the Muséum national d'histoire naturelle in Paris. In 1884 he earned his doctorate of sciences with a thesis on the structure of the stomach in crustaceans, afterwards working as an assistant in the ichthyology and herpetology department at the museum.

During his career he described numerous herpetological taxa, most notably species from Madagascar, Tonkin, Borneo, Mexico and Central America. In addition, he has several species named after him, including reptiles, Alluaudina mocquardi, Mochlus mocquardi, Tretanorhinus mocquardi, Tropidophorus mocquardii, and Xenotyphlops mocquardi; and amphibians, Mantidactylus mocquardi and Mertensophryne mocquardi.

== Written works ==
- Recherches anatomiques sur l'estomac des crustaces podophtalmaires (1883) – Anatomical research on the stomach of Podophthalmia.
- Note sur quelques reptiles du cap Blanc (1896) – Notes on some reptiles of Cap Blanc.
- Recherches sur la faune herpetologique des Iles de Borneo et de Palawan (1890) – Research on herpetological fauna from Borneo and Palawan.
- Notes sur quelques reptiles de Tanga, don de M. Gierra (1897) – Notes on some reptiles of Tanga.
- Notes herpetologiques (1897) – Herpetological notes.
- Le droit de la France de pecher le homard à Terre-Neuve au point de vue scientifique (1899) – The right of France to fish for lobster in Newfoundland from a scientific viewpoint.
- Quelques essais de pisciculture en eau douce (1902) – Some essays on freshwater pisciculture.
- Synopsis des familles, genres et espèces des reptiles écailleux et des batraciens de Madagascar (1909) – Synopsis of families, genera and species involving scaly reptiles and amphibians of Madagascar.
- Sur un nerf cardiaque naissant des ganglions cérébroïdes chez la langouste (1912) – On a cardiac nerve arising from the cerebroid ganglia in lobster.
- Mission scientifique au Mexique et dans l'Amerique centrale. Recherches zoologiques. Troisième partie, Etudes sur les reptiles et les batraciens – Scientific mission to Mexico and in Central America. Zoological research. Third part, studies on the reptiles and the amphibians. by Auguste Dumeril, Marie Firmin Bocourt, François Mocquard, Paul Brocchi.
